= Thilagavathi =

Indian social activist and Therukoothu artist

Thilagavathi Palani (alternatively P. Thilagavathi, abbreviated as Thilaga; born 13 September 1990) is an Indian social activist and Therukoothu artist, performing primarily through the form of Kattaikkuttu. She is one of the founders of the Sri Krishna Kattaikattu Kuzhu, a Koothu group in Tamil Nadu. Thilagavathi is the recipient of the Akademi Award for her contribution to traditional theatre.

== Biography ==
Thilagavathi was born on 13 September 1990 to Parimala and Palani Pandu and the eldest of four siblings. She grew up in the village of Seelavam in Kanchipuram district where her father was the member of a Kattaikkuttu folk theatre trope which would perform in nearby villages in which she is described to have become deep invested at a small age. Her parents allowed her to perform in the male dominated theatre performance art with the trope till she hit puberty. Eventually, she was able to convince her parents to permit her to continue participating, who according to her bestowed confidence on her amid backlash from their neighbors and relatives. She joined the Kattaikkuttu Gurukulam of P. Rajagopal and finished her general schooling till her secondary education. The Gurukulam was a residential theatre school which provided mainstream education alongside Kuttu training.

Thilagavathi graduated from the Kattaikkuttu Gurukulam in 2010. Following her graduation, she became involved in social service work and began performing in various schools in impoverished areas. Her theatrical compositions were depictions of the struggles of women and children, raising awareness and educating children on hygiene and cleanliness through the medium of the traditional theatre and with a primary focus towards preventing child sexual abuse by raising awareness of sexual harassment. By the end of 2015, she had visited over 100 schools in various slums across the state of Tamil Nadu. She has also worked with disabled students including teaching social interactions and facial expressions to children on the autism spectrum through her Koothu performances.

She co-founded the group called Sri Krishna Kattaikattu Kuzhu in 2014, becoming the youngest and the first woman among proprietors of a Koothu group. The group was an all women Kattaikkuttu troop. She also joined the Wind Dancers' Trust, an organisation specialising in imparting education to children through traditional arts. The trust was founded by the Bharatanatyam dancer Sangeeta Isvaran, who herself is a social worker having worked with marginalised groups in an attempt to bring about social reform. Thilagavathi has produced a number of theatrical compositions and choreographed street plays with the organisation to entertain and educate street children and sex workers. Through the Trust, she has also introduced Kattaikkuttu in the countries of France, United Arab Emirates, Malaysia and the United States.
