= Natya Yoga =

Natya Yoga may refer to:

- Bharata Natyam, classical dance form in India
- Natya Yoga, dance yoga practiced in Classical Indian musical theatre
- Natya Yoga, first practiced by Narada, a divine sage from the Vaisnava tradition of Hinduism
