= Classical Indian musical theatre =

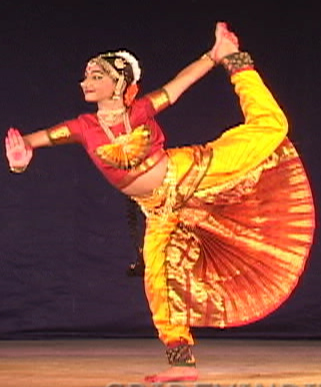
Bharatanatyam

Classical Indian musical theatre is a sacred art of the Hindu temple culture. It is performed in different styles.

== Overview ==
Classical Indian musical theatre theory can be traced back to the Natya Shastra of Bharata Muni (400 BC). The Sangeet Natak Akademi currently confers classical status on eight styles:

1. Bharatanatyam
2. Odissi
3. Kuchipudi
4. Kathak
5. Mohiniaattam
6. Kathakali
7. Manipuri
8. Sattriya

Classical Indian musical theatre at its best is Natya Yoga, has the most powerful means to lead its worshipers, the artist, to the Divine. It is a sincere depiction of the Divine. It is a sincere depiction of the realities in life, an embodiment of the imagination and gracefulness, the very soul which thereby creates as it were the “Idol of the Beautiful”.

While Bharatanatyam, Odissi and Kuchipudi are the orthodox styles that claim to preserve the knowledge of the Natya Shastra most faithfully, Kathak is different from other styles as it is a mixture of the Persian dance and the Indian folk dance movements. It derives its name from the community of Kathaks, who are custodians of the art. It is from this house (ghar) or family that this form has taken its origin. The words Kathak and Kathakali are derived from katha meaning storytelling and kali meaning play. The Kathak dance style was founded by the master Maharaj Binda Din. Kathak dancing performed by a dancer who stands and moves about and lasya (the aspect) in which the dancer kneels or remains immobile the whole time except for the (gat) a descriptive passage, performed in a gentle rhythm and tells stories with his expressive powers only, with his face and hands.

On the physical side the dancer must have perfect control of his body and limbs, which is achieved at least 12 years of study. Special massage is given to the feet. The Kathakali technique of using the face expression is a pure marvel of accomplishment. Some ancient masters of this dance have such control of their facial muscles that they can laugh with one side and cry with the other. Every Kathakali must be master of both tandava (vigorous masculine style at changing from one style to another). Lasya is divided into two categories; one suitable for men (for presenting love scenes, displays of sympathy and sentiment and so on) and the other for women who take female roles. Indian dancing is not just physical movements of hands and legs, it is a form of physical art with body and mind for both men and women alike as well as a form of worship to the Almighty Divine Gods.

An important feature of Indian classical dances is the use of Mudras or hand gestures. Mudras are used by the artists to express their feeling or even the whole story.

== Later Indian musical theatre ==
Ancient Sanskrit drama had a highly stylized nature with an emphasis on spectacle, where music, dance and gesture combined "to create a vibrant artistic unit with dance and mime being central to the dramatic experience." Sanskrit dramas were known as natya, derived from the root word nrit (dance), characterizing them as spectacular dance-dramas.

Traditional folk theatre became popular from around the 10th century with the decline of Sanskrit theatre. These regional traditions include the Yatra of Bengal, the Pala and Dasakathia of Odisha, the Ramlila of Uttar Pradesh, and the Terukkuttu of Tamil Nadu. In particular, Parsi theatre "blended realism and fantasy, music and dance, narrative and spectacle, earthy dialogue and ingenuity of stage presentation, integrating them into a dramatic discourse of melodrama. The Parsi plays contained crude humour, melodious songs and music, sensationalism and dazzling stagecraft." These traditions in musical theatre have continued in modern Indian cinema, particularly in musical films produced by Bollywood.

In modern days, Kathakali is also learned and performed by women.

== Influence on Indian musical films ==
Classical Indian musical theatre had a profound influence on shaping the conventions of Indian popular cinema, particularly in Bollywood and South Indian musical films:

- Ancient Sanskrit drama, with its highly stylized nature and emphasis on spectacle, where music, dance and gesture combined "to create a vibrant artistic unit with dance and mime being central to the dramatic experience." Sanskrit dramas were known as natya, derived from the root word nrit (dance), characterizing them as spectacular dance-dramas which has continued Indian cinema.
- The traditional folk theatre of India, which became popular from around the 10th century with the decline of Sanskrit theatre. These regional traditions include the Yatra of Bengal, the Ramlila of Uttar Pradesh, and the Terukkuttu of Tamil Nadu.
- The Parsi theatre, which "blended realism and fantasy, music and dance, narrative and spectacle, earthy dialogue and ingenuity of stage presentation, integrating them into a dramatic discourse of melodrama. The Parsi plays contained crude humour, melodious songs and music, sensationalism and dazzling stagecraft."

== See also ==
- Indian classical drama
- Theater of India
