= Kuppusamy Mudaliar =

Indian freedom fighter known for his powerful oratory

Kodai Idi Kuppusamy Mudaliar
- Born: 4 August 1891
- Died: 5 January 1961 (aged 69)

Kuppusamy Mudaliar (1891–1961), known as "Kodai Idi" ("thunderstorm in summer") for his powerful oratory, was an Indian freedom fighter.

== Life ==
Born on 4 August 1891 in Vellore, he was actively involved in the Salt Satyagraha (1930–31) and Quit India Movement (1941), for which he was imprisoned for a year in Alipuram Jail.

Mudaliar collaborated with fellow activist V. M. Obaidullah in organising public meetings, processions, and rallies, earning the duo the nickname "Twins of Vellore". He inspired people through his speeches and street plays (therukoothu), attracting large crowds from neighbouring towns such as Arcot and Ranipet.

Post-independence, he was nominated to the Rajya Sabha. Kuppusamy Mudaliar died on 5 January 1961, and a government school in Vellore was named in his honour.
