= Sri Moolastaneswara Swamy Temple, Mulapeta =

Coordinates: 14.4483°N 79.9695°E

Sri Moolastaneswara Swamy Temple is the oldest Sri Shaiva Kshetra, from 11th Century. It is located at Mulapeta on the west side of Nellore, Andhra Pradesh, India. It is dedicated to one of the variations of Lord Shiva. Maha Shivaratri is a Hindu festival celebrated there. The traditional festival activities of Karthika Masam is the famous grand occasion for this temple.

== History ==
Mulasthaneswara temple is known as Mulapet Shivalayam, which is said to be 1400 years old. In the ancient times of the Nellore in the area of this temple is in the forest and it was established during the reign of the Kakatiya dynasty. It showcases the architectural style of that era.

Tikkana Somayaji started a Mahabharatha translation into Telugu only after offering prayers to the deity there.
