= Kashi Yatra =

Pilgrimage to the city of Kashi

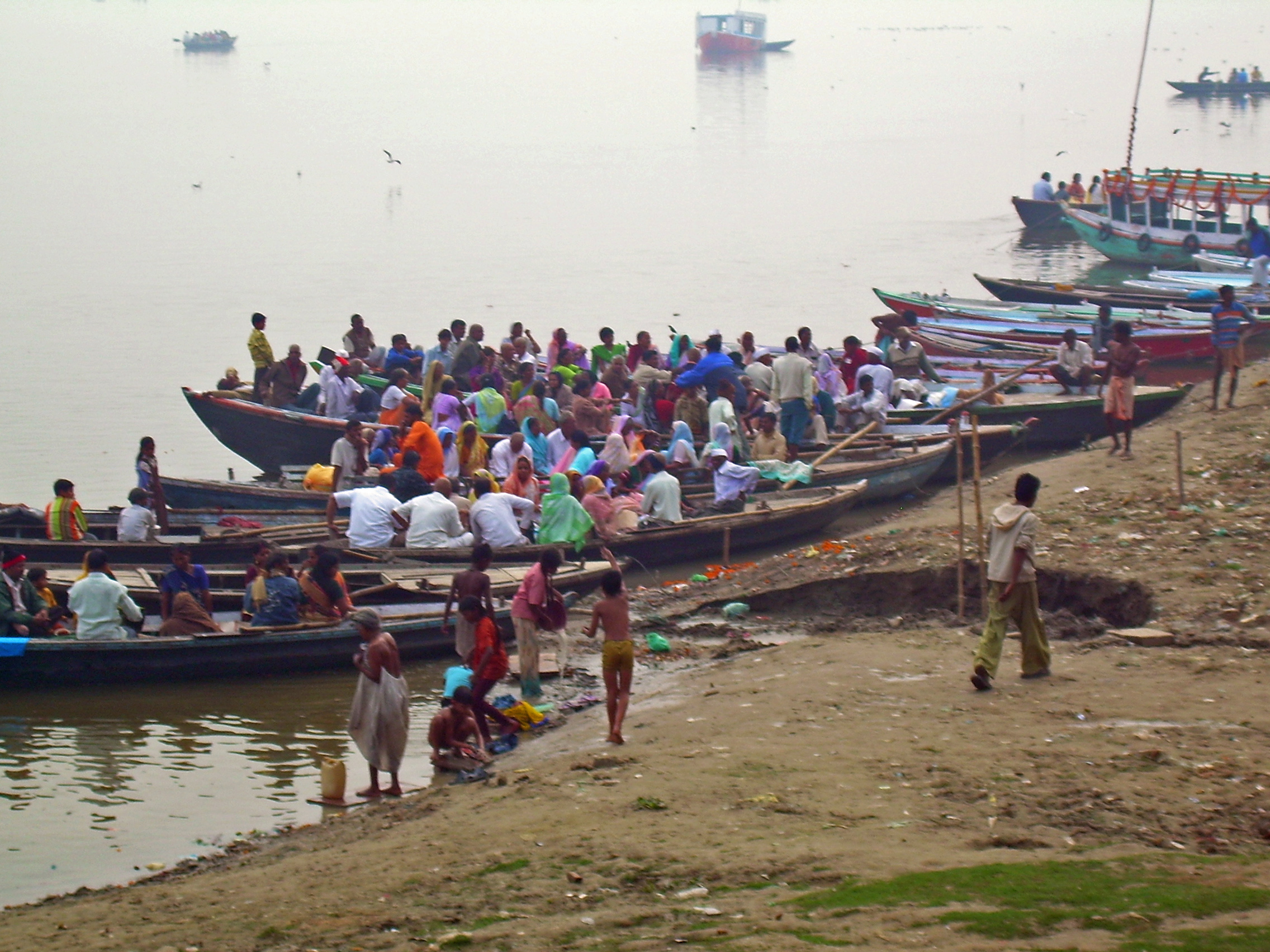
Hindu pilgrims undertaking the Kashi Yatra.

Kashi Yatra (Sanskrit: काशीयात्रा, romanized: Kāśīyātrā, lit. 'Pilgrimage to Kashi') refers to the yatra (pilgrimage) to the city of Kashi (Varanasi) in Hinduism. Regarded to be among the holiest of cities in Hinduism, pilgrims undertake a journey to this city due to the belief that it would allow them to achieve mukti (salvation). The significance of this pilgrimage is explained in the Skanda Purana. Kashi is referred to as an important tirtha (holy site) in Hindu literature, with the Kashi Vishwanath temple of the city considered to be among the most sacred sites dedicated to the deity Shiva.

It also refers to a name of a ceremony during a Hindu wedding: A bridegroom expresses the desire to become an ascetic and undertake a pilgrimage to Kashi, carrying slippers, an umbrella, a bamboo fan, and other objects that may vary according to regional traditions. While he walks away from the wedding mandapa, the bride's father persuades the bridegroom to return, and marry his daughter.

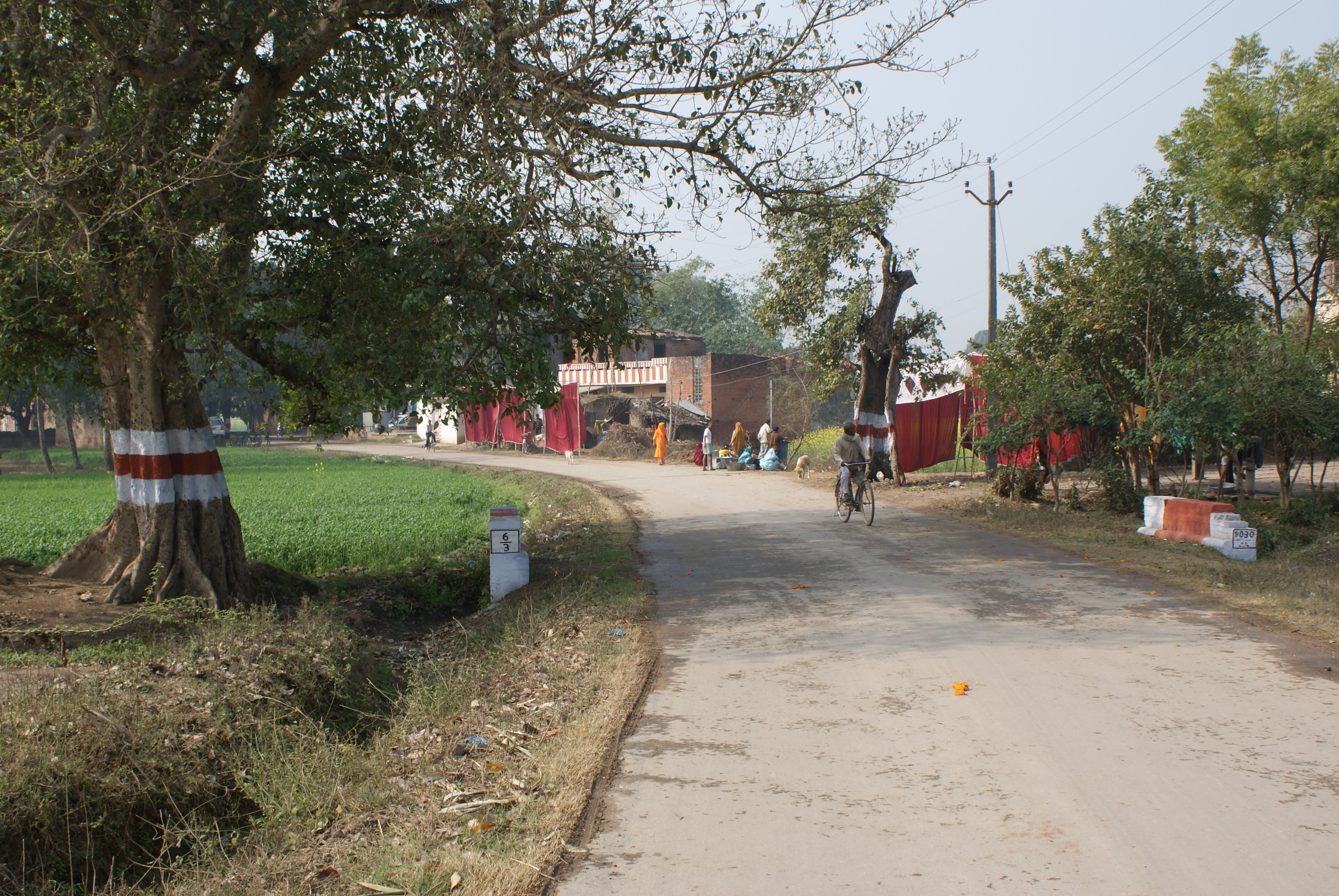
The panchakroshi route near Varanasi.

== Circuits ==
There are a number of routes or circuits that pilgrims may choose to undertake in the city within the Kashi Yatra:

- Panchakroshi Yatra
- Jala Tirtha Yatra
- Shivayatan Yatra
- Antargrihi Yatra
- Gauri Yatra
- Durga Devi Yatra
- Ekadasha Maharudra Yatra
- Navagraha Yatra

== See also ==
- Famous Hindu yatras
- Hindu pilgrimage sites in India
- Padayatra
- Ratha Yatra
- Yatra
