= Sangeeta Isvaran =

Bharatnatyam dancer, research scholar and social worker

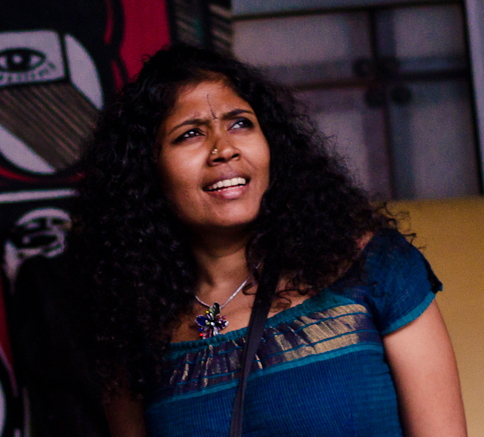
Sangeeta Isvaran visits Casa Fora do Eixo, Brazil, in 2012

Sangeeta Isvaran is an Indian Bharatanatyam dancer, research scholar, and social worker. She has been awarded with the Ustad Bismillah Khan Yuva Puraskar, the highest national award for young dancers.

== Early life and education ==
Isvaran graduated with a degree in mathematics from the Madras Christian College (MCC) in Chennai, India. She received formal training in Bharatanatyam from the age of five, becoming one of the first students of Abhiyana Sudha, the dance school founded by Kalanidhi Narayanan. She was also trained in the fine arts of Nritya, Abhinaya, Kalaripayattu, Kuchipudi, Carnatic music and the instrument of Nattuvangam.

== Career ==
Isvaran is a founder of the Katradi NGO, and is noted for developing the Katradi Method which utilises fine arts for the purpose of conflict resolution, imparting education and empowering marginalised and underprivileged communities. Isvaran has worked with abused children, victims of natural disasters, street children, drug addicts and commercial sex workers, among others, using dance and theatre in an effort to bring about social reform. Katradi is operated by her along with the American financial analyst turned social worker Liz Haynes. She also founded the Wind Dancers' Trust, which utilises folk arts for educating children, working in association with the Koothu artist Thilagavathi.

Isvaran collaborates with therapist and awareness platforms in her projects, because of to which she has been described as a "thinking dancer" and has been credited for bringing classical dance beyond a limited scope of aesthetic appeal. She was the co-ordinator of UNESCO initiative called Youth For Peace and held workshops in countries such as Mexico, Brazil and the United States and has collaborated with various non-governmental organisations (NGO) including Handicap International, World Vision International and Oxfam. She was also associated with the NGO called Desh, working to improve the living conditions of HIV/AIDS patients, and was a volunteer with the Chennai Migrant Task Force during the COVID-19 migration crisis in India.

She has held a fellowship at the Indian Council for Cultural Relations since 2008 as well as a fellowship at The Asia Foundation, for which she has conducted workshops in Thailand, Myanmar, Cambodia and Indonesia as part of the programme.
