= Sapta Puri =

Seven sacred pilgrimage sites in Hinduism

The Sapta Puri (Sanskrit सप्त-पुरी, saptapurī, "seven cities") are a group of seven Hindu tirtha, or holy pilgrimage sites, located in India. Pilgrimage to these sites is said to bless the pilgrim with moksha (liberation from the cycle of birth and death).

== History ==
The Sapta Puri include the birthplaces of religious and spiritual masters (such as Ayodhya, birthplace of Rama), as well as nitya tirthas, places naturally endowed with spiritual powers, such as Varanasi and Haridwar. Kanchipuram is known for its Kamakshi Amman Temple dedicated to the mother goddess. According to the Mahabharata, Krishna spent his childhood in Mathura; then spent 100 years in Dvaraka before leaving for his divine abode. Haridwar, with its shrines to Shiva and Vishnu, represents the gateway to Uttarakhand, as the sacred river Ganges emerges from the hills into the plains at this place. Varanasi is considered sacred, as it is believed that one's death at this place brings them salvation. Varanasi is often considered to the holiest of all sites and is a favourite of Shiva, and thus it is often referred as the City of Shiva. Ujjain, also known by the ancient name Avanti, has one of the 12 Jyotirlingas installed in the Mahakaleshwar Temple. Each of these cities is also famous for the spectacular melas or fairs held. Haridwar and Ujjain are famous for the Kumbh Mela held once every 12 years. Marriage festival of Kamakshi at Kanchipuram is a special occasion. Krishna Janmashtami (the birthday of Krishna - generally held in August as per Hindu calendar) is a special occasion in Dwarka and Mathura. The seven cities are well connected with the rest of the country by road, rail and air transport.

== The seven cities ==
Location of Sapta Puri.

A śloka from the Garuda Purana describes the seven pilgrimage centres:

अयोध्या मथुरा माया काशी काञ्ची अवन्तिका ।
पुरी द्वारावती चैव सप्तैताः मोक्षदायिकाः ॥

This translates to:

Ayodhyā, Mathurā, Mayā, Kaśī, Kañchi, Avantikā, Dwārāvatī,—
these seven cities should be known as the givers of liberation.

The modern names of these seven cities are:

- Ayodhya
- Mathura
- Haridwar (Maya or Gaya)
- Varanasi (Kashi)
- Kanchipuram (Kanchi)
- Ujjain (Avantika)
- Dwarka (Dwārāvatī)

=== Ayodhya ===
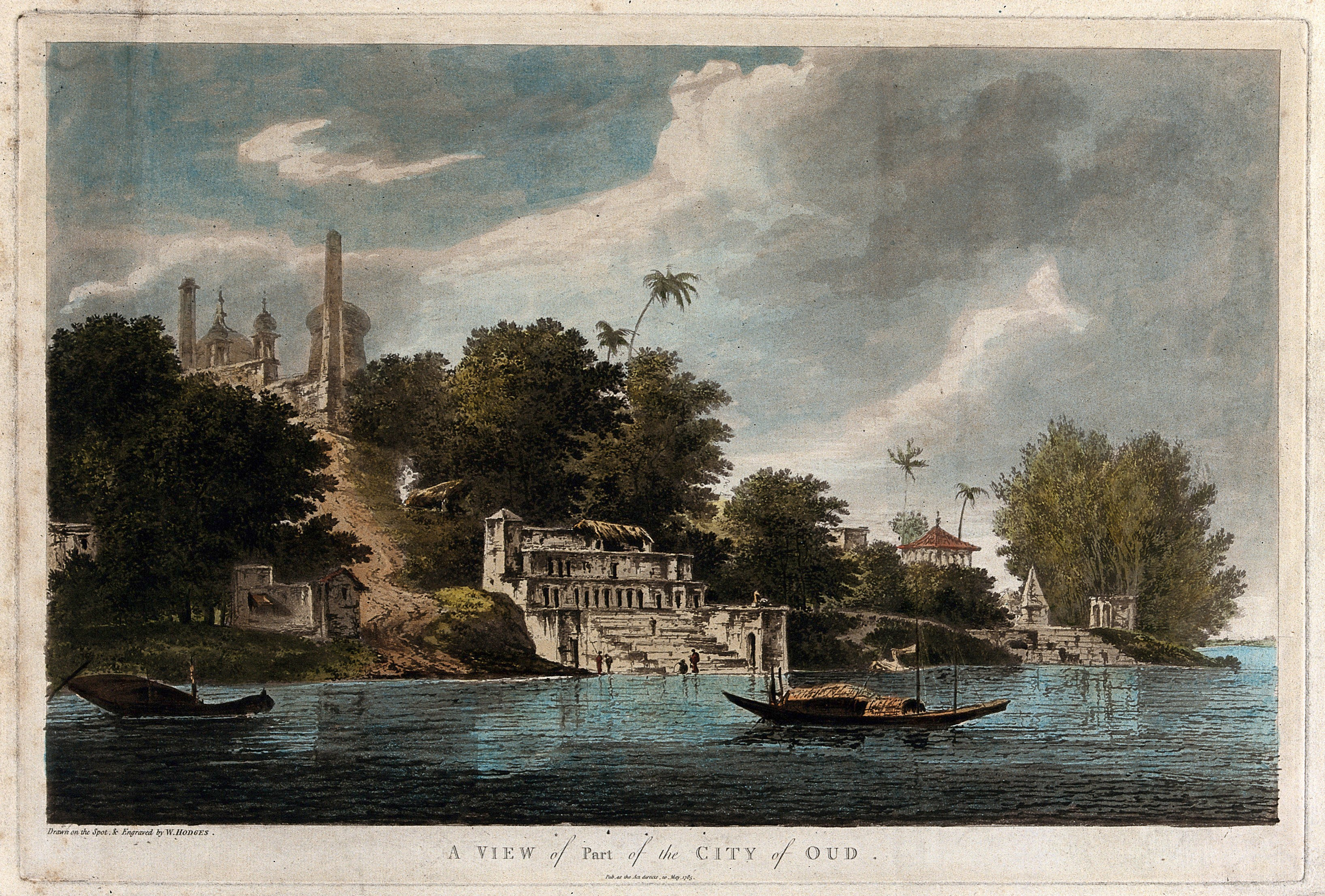
A view of Ayodhya in 1783 then called Oudh, Uttar Pradesh

Ayodhya (26.8°N 82.2°E) is the legendary place where lord Rama was born and it is also sometimes referred to as Ram Janmabhoomi ("Rama's birth place"). The modern town is located on the banks of river Sarayu, also spelt Saryu. There is a surfeit of temples in this town, numbering over 100. Some of the important ones are: Temple of Rama and his wife Sita, called the Kanak Bhavan; Hanuman temple called the Hanuman Garhi on top of a hill where, apart from a Hanuman statue in a sitting posture, there is also a 6 inches (15 cm) tall image of Hanuman always bedecked by flowers; the Kshireshwaranath temple of Sita, established by Kausalya, Rama's mother. In addition, there are several kunds or ponds and ghats (bathing steps to approach river or tank water level) with linkage to characters from puranas; such as the Brahma kund built in honour of Brahma's visit here, Sita kund, Bharat kund, Lakshman ghat where Lakshman, Rama's brother took bath, Rama ghat (also called Swargadwar meaning gateway to heaven).

There is a legend related to Kusha, son of Rama, in support of the Nageshwaranath temple here. The armlet, which Kusha had lost in the Sarayu river was found by a nag-kanya (a damsel of the serpent family), a devotee of Shiva, who fell in love with Kusha. A temple was built by Kusha in her honour and is stated to be the only surviving ancient temple dated to the reign of Vikramaditya.

Road distances from Ayodhya to Delhi is 799 kilometres (496 mi), to Lucknow 134 kilometres (83 mi) and to Varanasi 209 kilometres (130 mi).

=== Mathura ===
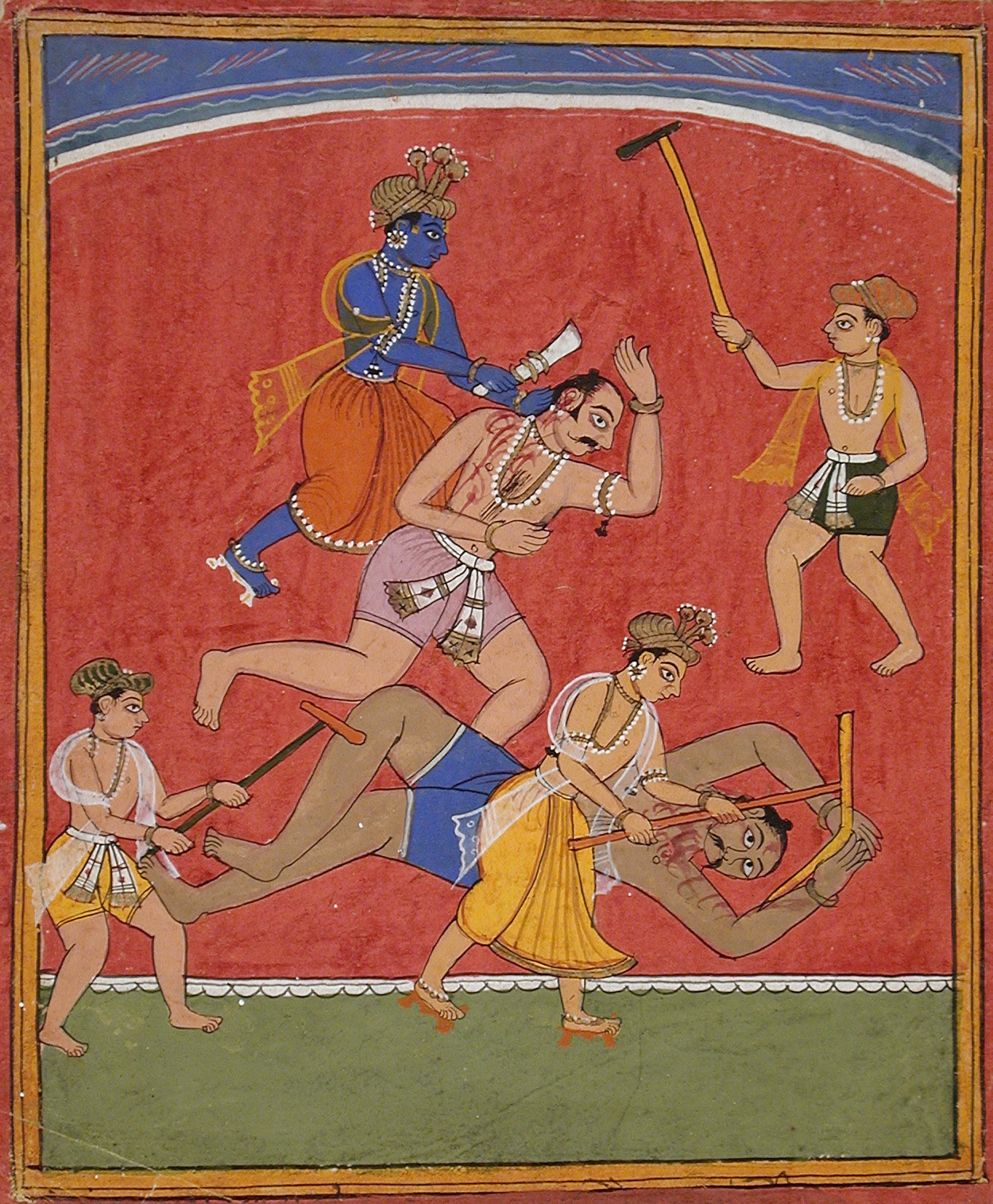
Krishna defeats his uncle Kamsa, the evil king of Mathura, at Mathura.

Mathura (27.45°N 77.72°E), Uttar Pradesh located on the right bank of the Yamuna River in the district headquarters of Mathura district, also called Mathura Mandala or Braj Bhoomi, is considered the heart of Indian culture. Krishna was born here and hence it is also popularly known as 'Krishnajanmabhoomi' ("Krishna's birth place").

Mathura is replete with several historic events. Based on archeological findings of ancient pottery, tools and tackles, Mathura's ancient history has been traced to about 1200 BCE. Vedic and Puranic literature also link founding of Mathura by Shatrughna (youngest brother of Rama). The Puranas also mention about two clans namely, Andhaka and Vrsni, the later clan was more organized under Krishna, attesting to historic linkage to the period between sixth century and fifth century BCE. Mauryan empire's influence from the fourth century BCE, when there was domination of Jain and Buddhist religious culture, have been noted from the sculptures recorded in Mathura. From this period, it has been inferred that "the city had a significant impact on the development of figurative sculpture elsewhere in the country". It was also a commercial hub during this period, imbibing composite culture and religious ethos, apart from establishing a prospering commerce both within and across the borders of the region. Following the Mauryan rule, the Kushans ruled till 3rd century CE when the sacred and secular life styles coalesced. Then a number of rulers followed, with the Gupta Empire under Samudra Gupta ruling between 330 CE and 380 CE. During the Gupta Empire, which lasted until the sixth century CE, there was decline in the prosperity of Mathura. The Huns sacked the city in the sixth century. Thereafter, the city was controlled by Maukhari Dynasty of Kanauj when the Krishna cult evolved from the 7th century onwards to make the city a hub of Krishna worship in the country. Then Mahmud of Ghazni invaded and ransacked Mathura and decamped with all religious treasures made of gold and silver. This was followed by ushering in the rule of Slave Dynasty or Delhi Sultanate from 1193 CE and subsequently by the Mughal Dynasty rule, which lasted till the British took over. The Mughal rule, in particular of Aurangzeb saw the highest level of persecution, when in 1669 the Keshava temple was demolished and in its place a mosque was built. Even though the jat community of the region tried unsuccessfully to restore some of the temples but repeated Muslim depredation continued and it was not until the British Raj came into effect, after the Sepoy Mutiny in 1857, that Krishna worship in Mathura got a reprieve. British archeologists were successful in recreating the ancient historicity of the city and providing insight to Indian culture. Krishna temples and ancient history are now both major attractions of the city.

The present Keshav Dev Temple has been built at the same location where several major temples had been built in the 5000 years of hoary past, which is traced to the Vajranabha, the great grandson of Krishna. A grand temple was rebuilt during the reign of Chandra Gupta Vikramaditya in the 5th century that was sacked by Mahmud of Ghazni. Thereafter, at the same location Raja Veer Singh Deva Bundela had built a 250 feet (76 m) high temple during Jahangir's reign, which was also destroyed by Aurangzeb in 1669 and a mosque built in its place, which can be seen adjoining the present temple. The present temple (see picture in infobox) was completed in 1958 with installation of images of Radha Krishna. In the adjoining altars several images have been installed; on the left altar images of Jagannath (a form of Krishna), Balarama (Krishna's brother) and Subhadra (Krishna's sister) are seen; on the right altar idols of Rama, Sita and Lakshman are installed, right across there is a Hanuman idol. Images of Shiva and goddess Durga are also seen within the main temple foyer. The main temple complex also has a small shrine where Krishna was born (said to be the prison where he was born) depicting images of Vasudeva, Devaki and four-armed Krishna.

On the bank of the Yamuna River, at Vishrama ghat aarti is offered every evening to the river, since it is stated to be the location where Krishna rested after slaying King Kamsa, his maternal uncle. Images of goddess Yamuna and her brother Yama, the god of death, are also located here.

There are many other temples of importance to pilgrims within Mathura, to name only a few, such as the Prem Mandir Vrindavan, Radha Govind Dev Ji Temple, Radha Madan Mohan Temple, Radha Damodar Temple, Radha Gopinath temple, Banke Bihari temple, Krishna Balarama temple, Rangaji temple, Radha Vallabh Temple, Nidhivan and Seva Kunja. Also, in the nearby Vrindavan where Krishna spent his childhood days, there is a galaxy of temples (said to be 5000), which is also a very pious place for pilgrims. It is 12 kilometres (7.5 mi) away from Mathura.

Other important religious events observed by pilgrims in the precincts of Mathura and Vrindavan are the Vrindavan Parikrama (religious practice) (circumambulation around the temples along a prescribed path) and the Braj Mandal parikrama during October–November, which takes 3 months to complete on foot, as it includes going round the Govardhan hill, apart from several other shrines.

It is located about 50 kilometres (31 mi) north of Agra, and 150 kilometres (93 mi) south of Delhi; about 20 kilometres (12 mi) from holy Vrindavan.

=== Haridwar ===
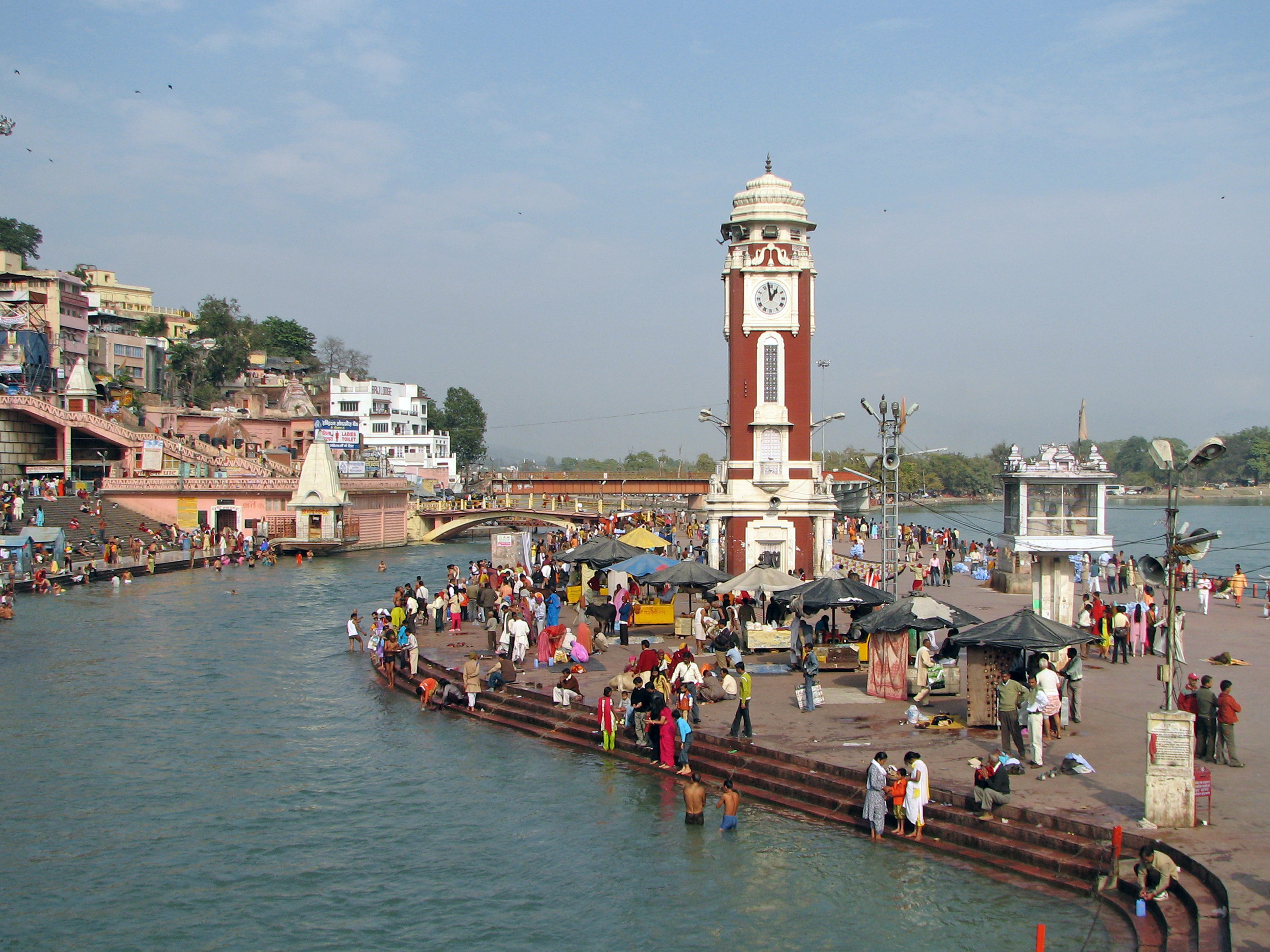
Har-ki-Pauri at Haridwar

"Haridwar", also written as "Hardwar", literally means "gateway to god Vishnu (Hari)" or "gateway to god Shiva (Har)". It is the holiest city in the state of Uttarakhand. It is strategically located (29.96°N 78.16°E) on the western bank of the river Ganges as it emerges into the plains at the exact location where the Har-Ki-Pauri ghat has been built to facilitate pilgrims to take a holy bath. It is thus also called the Gangadwara, the place where the Ganges descends to the plains. Every year, thousands of people flock to Haridwar, also called Hardwar, to bathe at the Har-Ki-Pauri ghat (ghat is an embankment structure built out of stone slabs leading to the river edge to facilitate bathing) since it is believed that the feet of Vishnu is imprinted on a rock preserved here. Every evening at sun set time at the ghat, thousands of pilgrims offer arti, a Hindu ritual of offering lights of earthen lamps on small floating leaf holders with flowers, as the temple bells reverberate amidst chanting of hymns.

Legend from Hindu scriptures state that Haridwar is one among the four sites where drops of Amrita, the elixir of immortality, accidentally spilled over from the pitcher, in which it was being carried away by the celestial bird Garuda, after the Samudra manthan (churning of the ocean); the other three places are said to be Ujjain, Nasik, and Prayagraj.

Another legend narrated for this pilgrim place is that sage Kapila had cursed the ancestors of prince Bhagiratha. Bhagiratha, therefore, wanted to atone for their sins by performing penance to god Shiva here. Shiva pleased with the prayers of Bhagiratha, allowed the Ganges to trickle through his locks and fall on earth from heaven.

It is from here that the Ganges emerging out of the Shivalik hills of the Rudra-Himalayas travels a distance of 2,000 kilometres (1,200 mi) through the fertile Gangetic plains of North India. It is also the site where the river has been tapped for beneficial uses of irrigation and hydro-power generation by a complex system of barrages (low gated weirs) with large canal systems. Its hoary history, closely spun around the epic Mahabharata (also substantiated in the travelogues of the Chinese chronicler Hiuen Tsang), records that Timurlane had ransacked this town in the year 1399 CE. Apart from the holy ghat, there are a large number of temples in the city dedicated to Shiva, Shakti or Durga (a cable car way has been built to approach this temple, apart from the ancient approach by steps over the hills), Vishnu and a galaxy of other deities. It is the location where, Hindus from all parts of the country, particularly North India, immerse ashes of the dead and perform last rites.

Apart from the regular annual pilgrimage season from April to November, during February–March Magh Mela ('mela' means "fair") is also held on a large scale. Other spectacular events that are held here are the Ardh Kumbha Mela (half Kumbh Mela) held every six years. The 12 years cycle Kumbh Mela is held during January or February depending on the Hindu Calmanac. It is the occasion when lakhs of people congregate here for a holy dip in the Ganges. The Kumbh Mela (literal meaning is ('festival of pots') is the "confluence of faith" since lakhs of people irrespective of their caste affiliations attend it. Astrological combination of planets decide the date for the event; generally when Jupiter, Sun and Moon are in the same zodiacal sign of the Aquarius, but in Haridwar it is fixed when Sun is in Aries and Jupiter in Aquarius, which is called the 'Vaishaki snan' (Vaishakha is the second month of Hindu calendar and snan means bathing).

A lyrical poetic expression of the place by Mavis Jones, which succinctly describes the environment and the religiosity of the pilgrims is quoted below.

A green so light, not jade, not sky.
Ice water rushed out of the Himalayan
silence into this wide scarred channel.

Along the other shore ashrams
are seashell-coloured, beige,
cream, coral, sea green.

The pilgrims who wash on the flooded steps
emerge new from the sacred waters.
They are transfigured in scarlet,

saffron, emerald. Even the birds
are blessed with such colour.
The kingfisher is as royal

as any prince his gazi a white-fronted
waterhen in grey and russet.
Now the song rich as honey,

of the black-headed oriole
calling pilgrims out of the dry land.
This benediction of water, overflowing.

As many gods are here, as many devotees
as specks of sun-lit dust rising
from a cremation ghat.

Haridwar is at a road distance of 214 kilometres (133 mi) from Delhi, the capital of the nation, and 52 kilometres (32 mi) from Dehradun, the state capital of Uttarakhand.

=== Varanasi ===
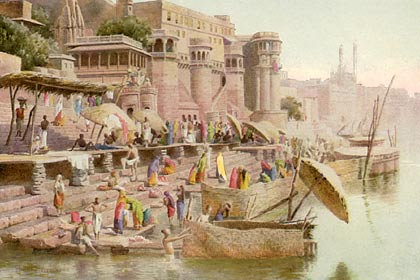
Famous Dashashwamedh Ghat

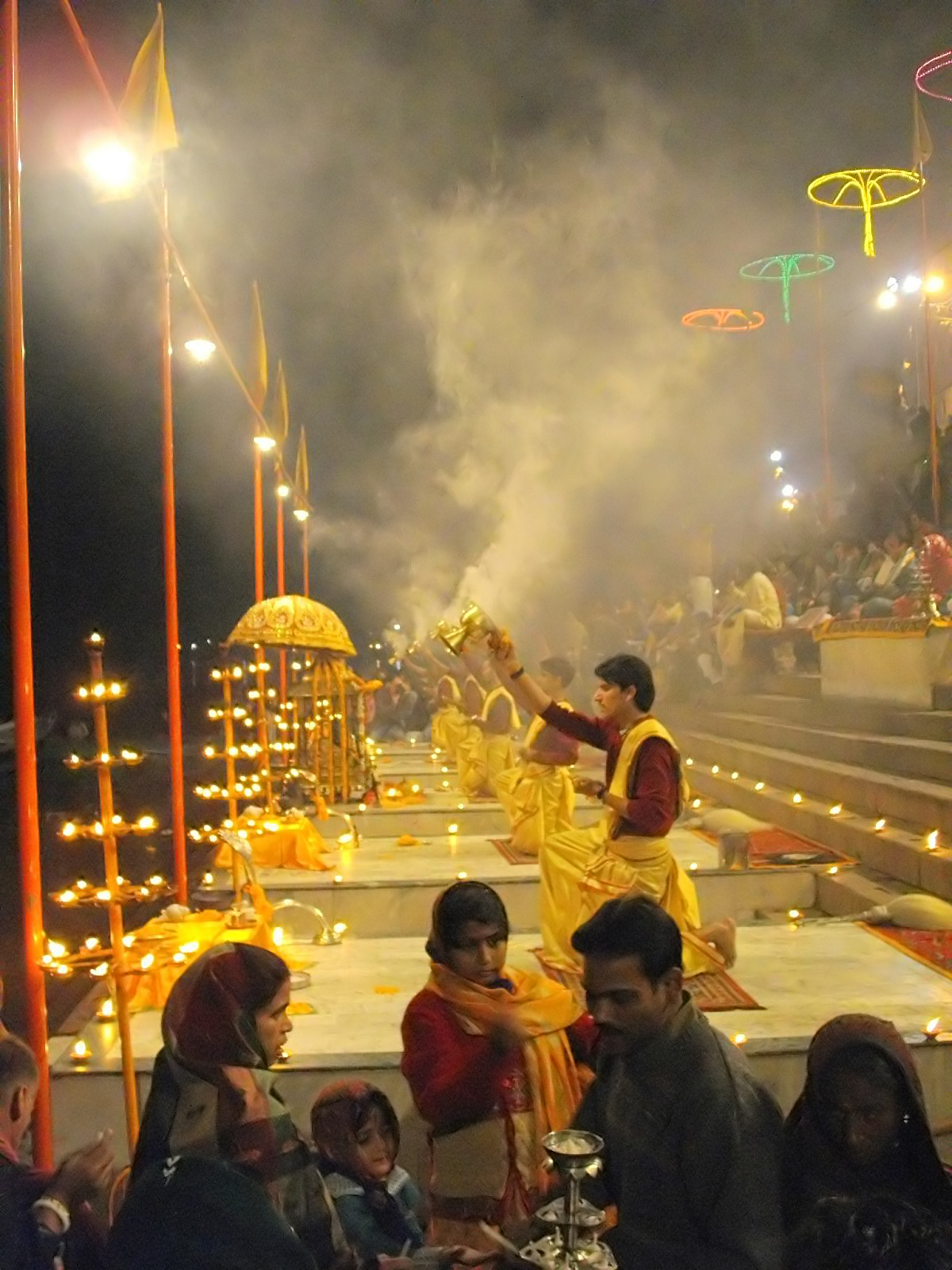
Festival of the Ganges River worship by arti at Dashashwamedh Ghat, Uttar Pradesh

Varanasi (25.282°N 82.9563°E) also called Kashi, Benares, is an ancient city, said to be the oldest inhabited one. The city was known by several names such as Avimuktaka, Anandakanana, Mahasmasana, Surandhana, Brahma Vardha, Sudarsana, and Ramya.

In view of its ancient historic, cultural and religious heritage it is considered as “the most holy of the seven sacred cities of Hinduism”. Its historical and religious legacy dates to the Buddha period (6th century BCE) and has been the centre of religious “Brahminical learning” with sages, philosophers, writers and musicians making it their home in the past several centuries. But much of its temple glory was subject to plundering and destruction by Mohammad Ghauri in the 12th century. The temples and religious institutions seen now in the city are mostly of the 18th century vintage.

The temples and the bathing ghats (ghats are embankments made in steps of stone slabs along the river bank where pilgrims perform ritual ablutions) are located on the left west bank of the holy Ganges river and the count of temples in the city is claimed to be 23,000 and the bathing ghats number 81. The most venerated and frequented ghats for devotional worship by the pilgrims are the Manikarnika Ghat, Harishchandra Ghat, Dashashwamedh Ghat (pictured), Assi Ghat and Panchganga Ghat. At two of the ghats (Manikarnika and Harishchandra Ghats), Hindus cremate their dead. The rivers 'Varuna' and 'Asi' combined form the name of the city "Varanasi". These two rivers flowing on the left bank of the Ganges enclose the old city of Varanasi. The ghats at the confluence sites of these two streams with the Ganges are also held in veneration. All these factors have contributed to the city being called the religious capital of Hinduism.

Varanasi is also known as the favourite city of the Hindu deity Shiva as it has been mentioned in the Rigveda that this city in older times was known as Kashi or "Shiv ki Nagri". The Pandavas went to Kashi in search of Shiva to atone for their sins of fratricide and bramhanahatya that they had committed during the epic Kurukshetra War of Mahabharata epic.

Among the innumerable temples in the city, most worshipped are: the Kashi Vishvanath Temple of Shiva; the Sankat Mochan Hanuman Temple; and the Durga Temple known for the band of monkeys that reside in the large trees nearby. In addition, there are two new temples, the Tulasi Manas and the Vishvanatha temple located in the Banaras Hindu University campus. Ancient Buddhist monasteries are seen at Sarnath, but they are mostly in ruins. There are also temples built by the Maha Bodhi Society and by the Chinese, Burmese, and Tibetan Buddhists.

Religious festivals are held here. On the occasion of the Mahashivaratri (meaning great night of Shiva) a procession of Shiva is taken from the Mahamrityunjaya Temple to the Kashi Vishvanath Temple. Another popular festival is the Ganges festival held in November or December when the Ganges is venerated by arti offered by thousands of pilgrims who also release lighted lamps to float in the river from the ghats (pictured). The historic event of Rama returning after 14 years of exile, termed vanavas (living in forest) in Sanskrit, and meeting his younger brother Bharat is celebrated during October or November as Bharat Milap ('Milap' means "meeting") festival. At the Tulsi Ghat, a classical musical soiree, particularly of dhrupad style, is held during March for 5 days where iconic artists from all parts of India are invited to perform.

In one sentence, Mark Twain, the renowned Indophile, has extolled the greatness of Varanasi thus: "Benares is older than history, older than tradition, older even than legend, and looks twice as old as all of them put together."

Varanasi is 780 kilometres (480 mi) from Delhi, the national capital and 300 kilometres (190 mi) from Lucknow, the state capital of Uttar Pradesh.

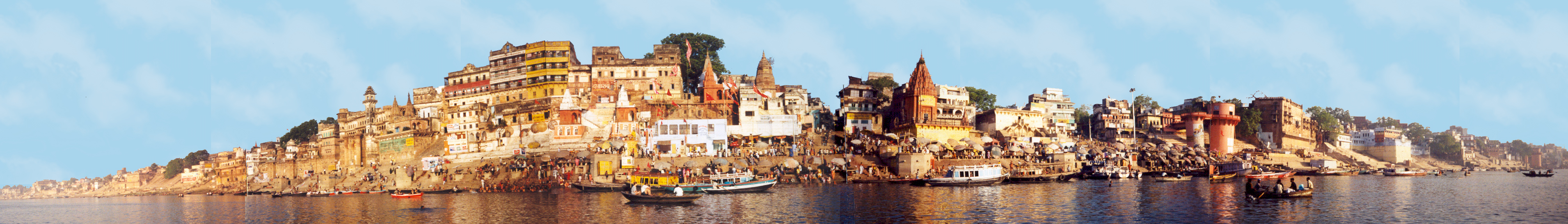
Varanasi or Kashi, the holiest and most ancient of the Sapta Puri.

=== Kanchipuram ===
Kanchipuram (12.82°N 79.71°E), the pilgrimage city, in Tamil Nadu, also known as Canjeevaram during the British rule, built during the Pallava Dynasty between 6th and 8th centuries CE, located on the bank of the Palar River, has an architectural legacy of over 1000 years. Before this period, it was the capital of early Cholas in the 2nd century BCE. After the rule of the Pallava Dynasty, the Vijayanagara Empire (1336 to 1646 CE) and the Nayaka dynasty period (14th–17th centuries CE) followed, in that order. Prior to the Pallava reign, it is conjectured, based on the chronicles of the Xuanzang, the Chinese pilgrim who visited Pallavas court, that the city was under the influence of Ashoka, the Mauryan emperor in 3rd century BCE. Xuanzang had also noted that Buddha (6th or 5th century BCE) had visited this place. Jain and Buddhist temples and stupas of the Chola Dynasty reign have been recorded but mostly do not exist on ground. But South Indian architecture got a fillip only during the Pallava rule, particularly of rock-cut temples during Mahendravarman I's reign (600–630 CE) after he converted from Jainism to Hinduism. He was considered a man with vision and intelligence, a scholar, musician and a playwright. Kanchipuram was considered second only to Varanasi city in fame and learning. Adi Shankara, the Hindu philosopher saint, who propagated the Advaita philosophy lived and taught here in the fifth century BCE.

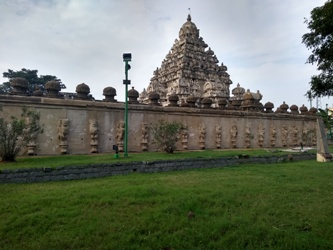
Kailasanathar Temple, Kanchipuram

The city has 108 Shaiva and 18 Vaishnava temples. The Hindu philosopher Ramanujacharya (1077–1157 CE) who propagated the Vishishtadvaita philosophy studied here. The temples are distributed in three zones of the city namely, the Vishnu temples are in the east zone, the Shiva shrines are on the outskirts of the city in the northern zone and the Jain mandirs are on the east across the Palar River.

Some of the exquisitely designed and built temples of the Vijayanagar period in Vijayanagara architecture style are the Ekamabaranath temple tower which is 192 feet (59 m) in height, and the Varadaraja Swamy temple, which has a 1000-pillar hall.

Kamakshi Amman temple is an ancient temple here and the most famous of all the temples in the city. It is associated with Adi Shankara. Legend has it that Kamakshi offered worship to a Shivaling made out of sand and gained Shiva's hand in marriage. The temple covers an area of about 5 acres (2.0 ha) and the sanctum is covered with gold plated Vimana. Kamakshi is enshrined in the temple in a sitting posture called the Parabramha Swaroopini, seated with the trinity of Bramha, Vishnu and Shiva.

Located 75 kilometres (47 mi) from Chennai, the state capital of Tamil Nadu, the city has a good network of roads, rail links and transport services to all parts of the country, and the nearest domestic and international airports are at Chennai.

=== Ujjain ===
Ujjain (23.182778°N 75.777222°E) with an ancient scriptural name of Avantika compliments both rich historical and religious traditions. The history dates its links to the period of Vikramaditya and Ashoka (3rd century BCE). The religious tradition links it to god Shiva triumphing over the demon king Tripurasura and then renaming the city as Ujjainyini (meaning 'conquers with pride').

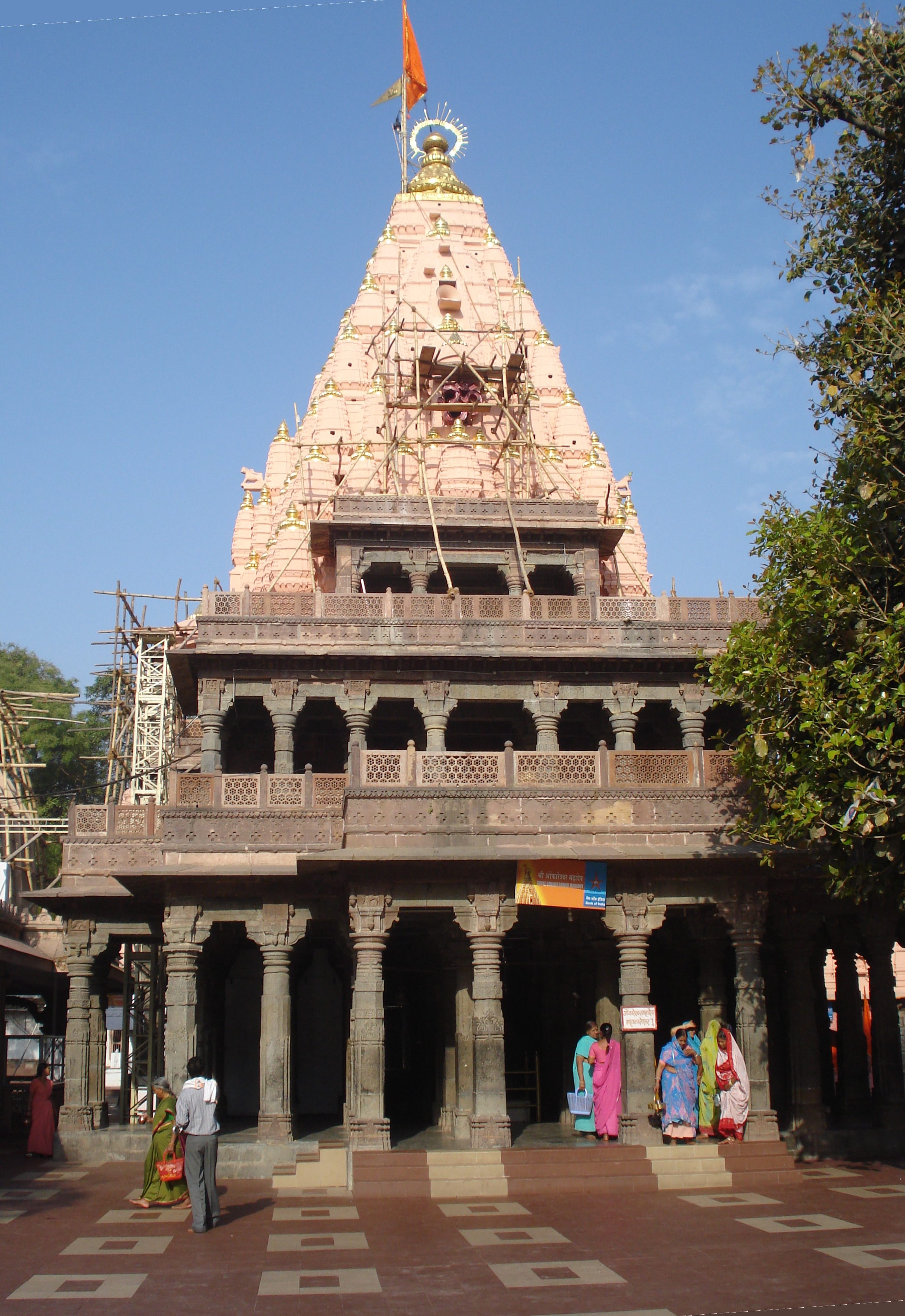
Mahakal temple at Ujjain, Madhya Pradesh

Ujjain, probably, also marks the spread of Hindu religious beliefs to the Central Asia region. Particular mention could be made to the reign of Vima Kadphises, during the Kushan Dynasty, who considered Shiva as his divine patron. During his reign, apart from the influence of Greek religious practices, worship of Shiva, in particular, was also seen as an accepted practice in Iran. This leaning is attributed to Vima Kadphises's victory over Indian territory. Inscriptions of his times in Iran establish that he had converted the temple of Dioscuri (built during Greeko – Bactrian period) at Dilberjin into a sanctuary for Shiva by decorating the place with a painting of Shiva and his wife Parvati. He got the wall painting of Shiva (Oeso) done by craftsmen he had taken from Ujjayani (Ujjain), apart from constructing a water conveyance system to the sanctuary of Shiva. Inscriptions further testify that the Kushan king attributed his rise to power to Srava (=Shiva) and Candavira. It is deduced that Candavira may be the same god as Candishvara, the God of Mahakala temple at Ujjain. It is also conjectured that the support of the Indian community (who worshipped Shiva) settled in eastern Iran and the encouragement he got from their priesthood, before and during his Indian campaign, and his relations with Ujjain, contributed to his deep involvement with the cult of Shiva. This devotion was continued by him even after his Indian campaign.

Emperor Ashoka also played a significant role as the Viceroy of Ujjain in enhancing its importance. Ashoka who ruled for three decades between 268 and 233 BCE started his career in Taxila (now in Pakistan) in the north west by subduing a revolt. Thereafter, his father Bindusara, of the Mauryan Dynasty, transferred Ashoka as his Viceroy to Ujjain, which was the famous capital of the earlier kingdom of Avanti, in Central India.

It was once the largest city and capital of Malwa region. In the ancient city of Ujjain, Jai Singh II ruled in the 18th century. Jai Singh II built an observatory here, called the Jantar Mantar. The reason for building the observatory here was that it was the centre of Hindu Astronomy since ancient times and it was located on the prime or first meridian (of longitude) established on the canons of Hindu astronomy. According to Indian astronomy, the first meridian of longitude passes through Ujjain. The modern calculations have established that the Tropic of Cancer passes through Ujjain.

Ujjain is about 776 kilometres (482 mi) south from Delhi, the capital city of India, and 183 kilometres (114 mi) west of Bhopal, the state capital of Madhya Pradesh. It is 402 kilometres (250 mi)away from Ahmedabad, and 655 kilometres (407 mi) north-east of Mumbai.

=== Dwarka ===
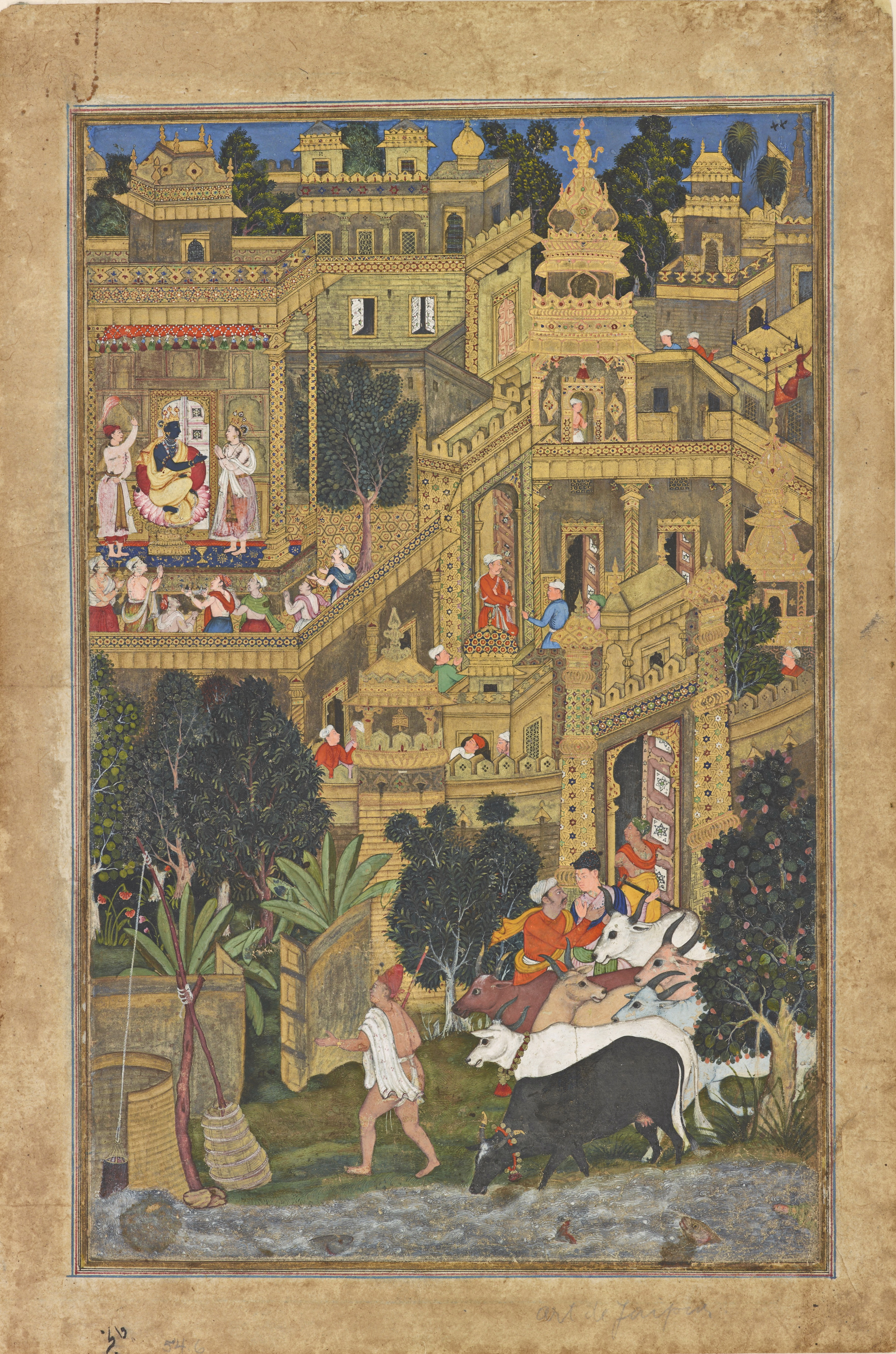
A Painting depicting Krishna's Dwarka made during Akbar's reign from the Smithsonian Institution

Krishna, an incarnation of god Vishnu, is believed to have migrated from Mathura to Dwarka (22.23°N 68.97°E) 5000 years ago and made Dwarka his capital., as noted in the scripture Bhagavata Purana. He established the city on the bank of the Gomti River. But after the death of Krishna, there was downfall of his dynasty, the Yadavas. This was further compounded by floods and eventual submergence of Krishna's city in the Arabian Sea. Presently, Dwarka is a small city located at the western tip of Saurashtra peninsular in Gujarat state on the shores of the Arabian Sea.

Chronology of the recorded historic events witnessed at the temple city linked directly to the temple, is dated from 400 BCE when Vajranabha built an umbrella type temple and deified his grand father Krishna's image there. It has undergone several changes with times under different rulers. Adi Shankaracharya is said to have got the Dwarakadheesh temple renovated and also added a shrine of goddess Adya Shakti. Over the next few centuries more renovations took place with grant of additional land till 1261 CE, when the temple was destroyed by Mohamed Shah. In subsequent years also, renovation took place but there was dispute between two groups for the control of the temple. In 1504, Vallabhacharya established the image of Dwarakadeesh in a well in Ladva village to protect it from Muslim marauders and again it was shifted to Dungarpur where the temple was renovated. In 1861, Maharaja Khanderao renovated the temple. During British rule, the temple tower was rebuilt. A golden pitcher was fixed on the temple tower by Maharaja Gaekwad in the year 1903 and further renovations were undertaken by the then Shankarachrya of Dwarka Peet. Since 1960, the conservation of the temple is under the control of the Government of India.

The present Dwarakhadheesh temple, also called the Jagat Mandir (universal shrine) or trilok sundar (most beautiful in all three worlds), is a seven storied structure, 43 metres (141 ft) in height, appears to be raising above the Arabian sea. It is dated to the 13th century CE on the basis of oceanographic explorations undertaken to trace the ancient temple, which was submerged in the Arabian sea. The elegantly carved temple shikara (tower) is adorned with a huge flag, which is said to be 52 yards (156 ft) in length with seven colours that can be seen flying from a distance of 10 kilometres (6.2 mi) (hoisting this flag has a great religious significance). There is an approach to the back side of the temple from the Gomti River end, which is built of 56 steps. The temple built in soft limestone has a sanctum enclosed within a large hall with covered entrance from three sides. While the external carvings depict erotic scenes, the temple sanctum is austere in design but the main image is elaborately ornamented.

A temple dedicated to Rukmini, Krishna's consort, is located in Bet Dwarka, 2 kilometres (1.2 mi) away from Dwarka. The temple is said to be 2500 years old but in its present form it is inferred to be of 12th century vintage. It is a richly carved temple decorated with sculptures of gods and goddesses on the exterior with the sanctum housing the main image of Rukmini. Carved naratharas (human figures) and carved gajatharas (elephants) are depicted in panels at the base of the tower. An interesting legend is narrated to justify separate dwelling temples, far away from each other, for Rukmini and her husband Krishna. It is said that at the request of sage Durvasa (who was renowned for his short temper and bestowing curses) Krishna and Rukmini pulled a chariot taking sage Durvasa to their house for dinner. On the way, when Rukmini asked for water to quench her thirst, Krishna drew Ganges water, by prodding the ground with his toe, for her to drink. Rukmini quenched her thirst with the Ganges water. But Durvasa felt insulted since Rukmini did not have the courtesy to offer him water to drink. He, therefore, cursed her that she would live separately from her husband.

Another legend states, while Dwarka was the official capital of Krishna where he held his assembly, his residence was at Bet Dwarka.

== See also ==
- Similar:
  - Ardhanarishvara
  - Harihara, fused characterization of Vishnu and Shiva
  - Lingodbhava, iconic representation of the Shiva
  - Lingaraja Temple
  - Tridevi, feminine representation of the Hindu trinity
  - Trimurti, male representation of the Hindu trinity
- Related:
  - Parikrama, circumambulation in Hinduism
  - Yatra, the Hindu pilgrimage
    - Char Dham, holiest pilgrimage circuit of 4 sites viz. Badrinath, Dwaraka, Puri and Rameswaram.
    - Chota Char Dham, smaller pilgrimage circuit of 4 sites in Uttarakhand viz. Yamunotri, Gangotri, Kedarnath, and Badrinath
    - Jyotirlinga, 12 holiest Shiva Lingam temples in India
