= Terukkuttu =

Tamil street theatre form

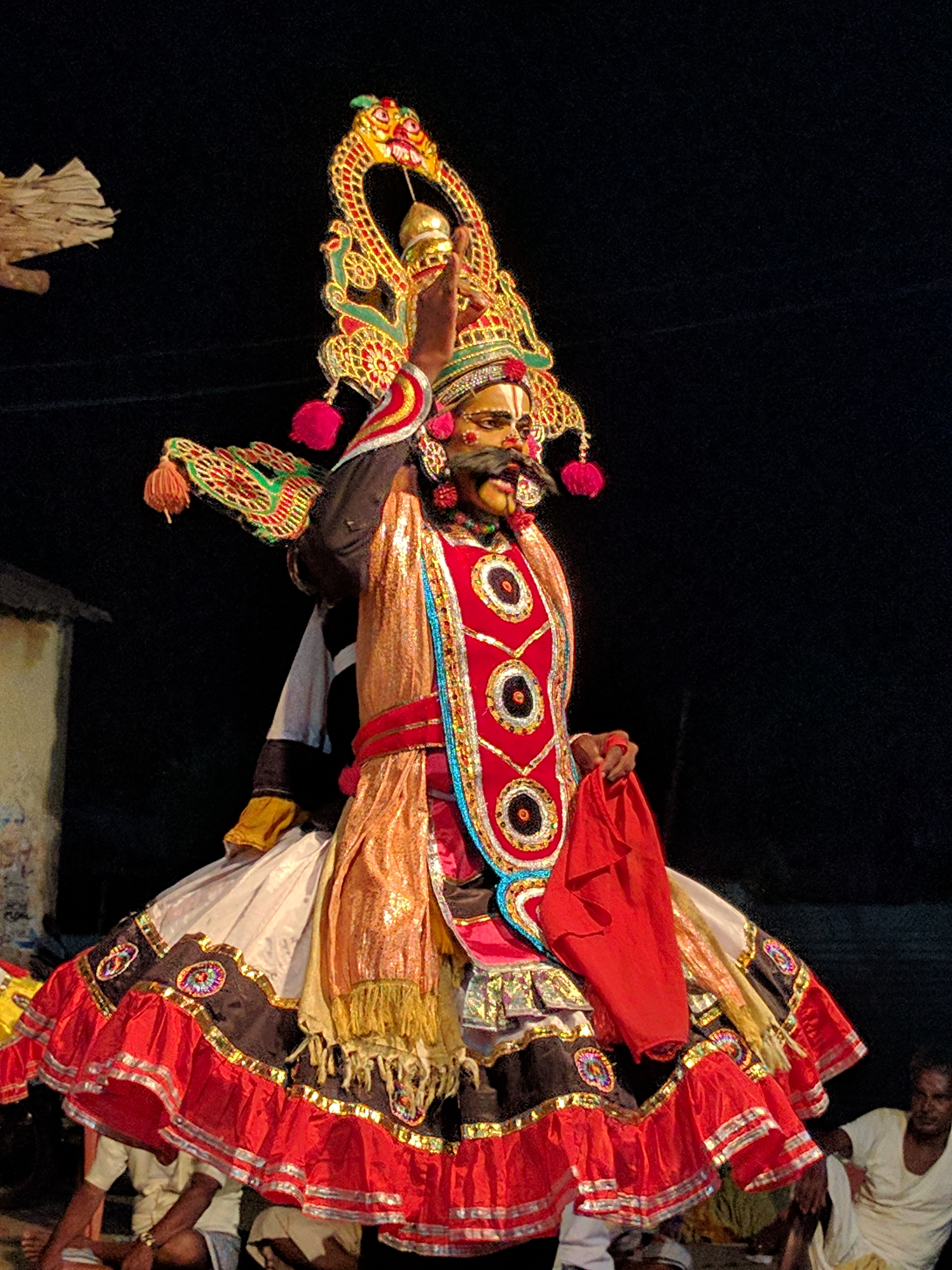
- An artist performing in Therukkuthu
- Stylistic origins: Koothu, Ancient Tamil music, Dance forms of Tamil Nadu
- Cultural origins: Tamilakam

Terukkuttu is a Tamil street theatre form practised in Tamil Nadu (India) and Tamil-speaking regions of Sri Lanka. Terukuttu is a form of Koothu, an entertainment, a ritual, and a medium of social instruction, originated from the early Tamilakam. The terukkuttu plays various themes. One theme is from the Tamil language versions of the Hindu epic Mahabharata, focusing on the character Draupadi. The terms Terukkuttu and Kattaikkuttu are often used interchangeably in the modern times; however, historically the two terms appear to have distinguished, at least in certain villages, between two different kinds of performance: while Terukkuttu referred to mobile performances in a procession, Kattaikkuttu denotes overnight, narrative performances at a fixed performance space.

== History ==
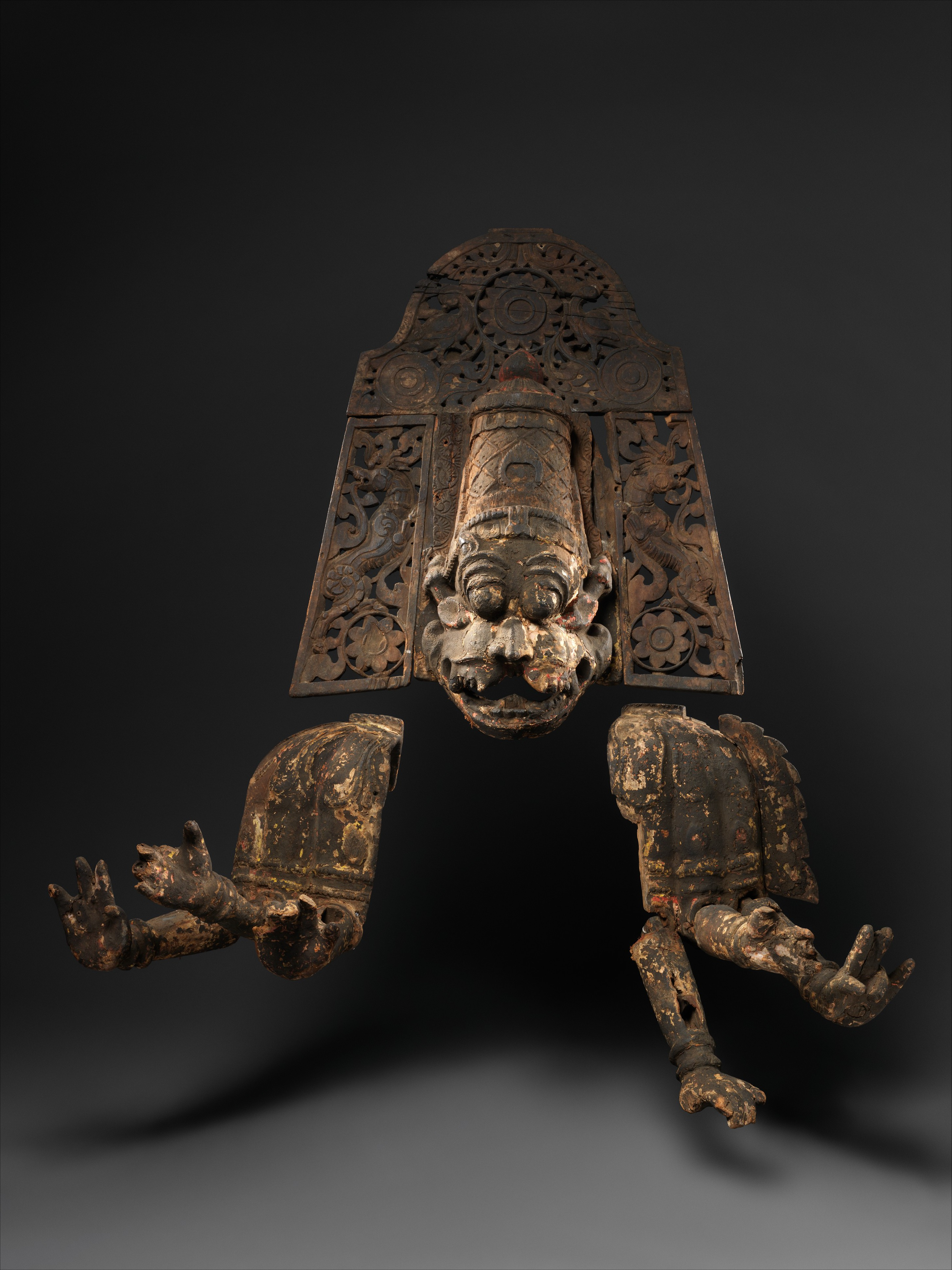
Koothu Performer's mask of Narashima character, circa 1700–1750

The term terukkuttu is derived from the Tamil words Teru ("street") and Kuttu ("theatre"). The word "Kattaikkuttu" is derived from the name of special ornaments known as kattai (or kattai camankal).

The writer M. Shanmugam Pillai has compared terukkuttu to the Tamil epic Silappatikaram, calling Silappatikaram a proto-form of terukkuttu. The Silappatikaram story is still performed by the terukkuttu actors, the terukkuttu drama commences and ends in a manner similar to the commencement and end of each canto in the epic, and the actors sing and converse in verse interspersed with prose, the prose coming after the verse as its explanation. Both Silappatikaram and terukkuttu are centered around the chastity and moral power of women as cherished values.

However, historically, the terukkuttu is not more than two to three centuries old. The researcher Richard A. Frasca wrote that certain of his performer-informants believed that the terukkuttu originally emanated from the Gingee area. It spread from South India to Sri Lanka, and became popular in Jaffna and Batticaloa. The early Sinhala Nadagam (open-air drama) closely followed Terukuttu plays in presentation and in style. The Jesuit priests in Jaffna also presented Catholic plays from the Portuguese tradition in Terukuttu style.

Many scholars note the similarity between terukkuttu and other neighbouring regional drama forms, such as Yakshagana and Kathakali. However, unlike Kathakali, terukkuttu is less codified, and is generally considered a folk art rather than a classical art form. In recent times, some terukkuttu groups have also started operating as professional troupes.

== Theme ==
Many terukuttu performances center around the enactment of Mahabharata story, with emphasis on the role of Draupadi. Terukkuttu plays on Ramayana are performed at Mariyamman festivals, and some of the plays also involve local deities.

The terukkuttu plays form part of ritual celebrations including the twenty-one day temple festival starting in Chittirai, the first month of the Tamil calendar. The terukkuttu performances begin in the middle of the festival, and continue till the morning of the penultimate day.

The core themes of the terukuttu plays include:

- Draupadi Kalyanam (The marriage of Draupadi)
- Supattirai Kalyanam (The marriage of Subhadra)
- Alli Arjunan (The Marriage of Arjuna with Alli)
- Pancal Capatam (The Vow of Draupadi)
- Arjunan Tapam (Arjuna's tapas)
- Krishnan Titu (The mission of Krishna)
- Abhimanyu Cantai (The defeat of Abhimanyu)
- Karna Mokshayam (The defeat of Karna)
- Patinettam Por (The Battle of the Eighteenth Day)
- Aravan kalappali ("Sacrifice of Aravan in the Battlefield")

== Style ==
The terukkuttu plays are a combination of song, music, dance and drama along with "clever stage tricks". The actors wear colorful costumes. The musical instruments used by the terukkuttu musicians include harmonium, drums, a mukhavinai (an instrument similar to oboe), and cymbals.

An acting arena is marked at courtyard of a temple, open ground or any other convenient site and people squat on the three sides of the rectangular arena. The chorus of singers and the musicians occupy the place on the rear side of the stage, and the actors use the front side. Two persons holding a curtain enter the arena, with an actor in the guise of Ganesha, the elephant-headed Hindu god. The chorus begins an invocation to Ganesha, and prayers are also offered to many other deities. The actor playing Ganesha now moves out of the arena, and Kattiyakkaran (jester and sutradhara i.e. the narrator) appears on the stage. Kattiyakkaran relates the story of the play to be performed and introduces the characters. Sometimes, the characters introduce themselves. Kattiyakkaran links the scenes, provides context to the happenings on the stage and also jests in between the scenes. The actors sing themselves, supported by the chorus.

The text of a terukkuttu play is a series of songs related by a theme. Each song is rendered in a raga, structured in form of a classical song. It is preceded by viruttam, chanting of four-line verses in the same raga as the song. After the song, an actor delivers a speech based on it.

The French theater group, Théâtre du Soleil, used elements of Terukuttu, including the two stories The Vow of Draupadi, and The defeat of Karna in their play, A Room in India.
