= Yatra =

Pilgrimage in Indian religions

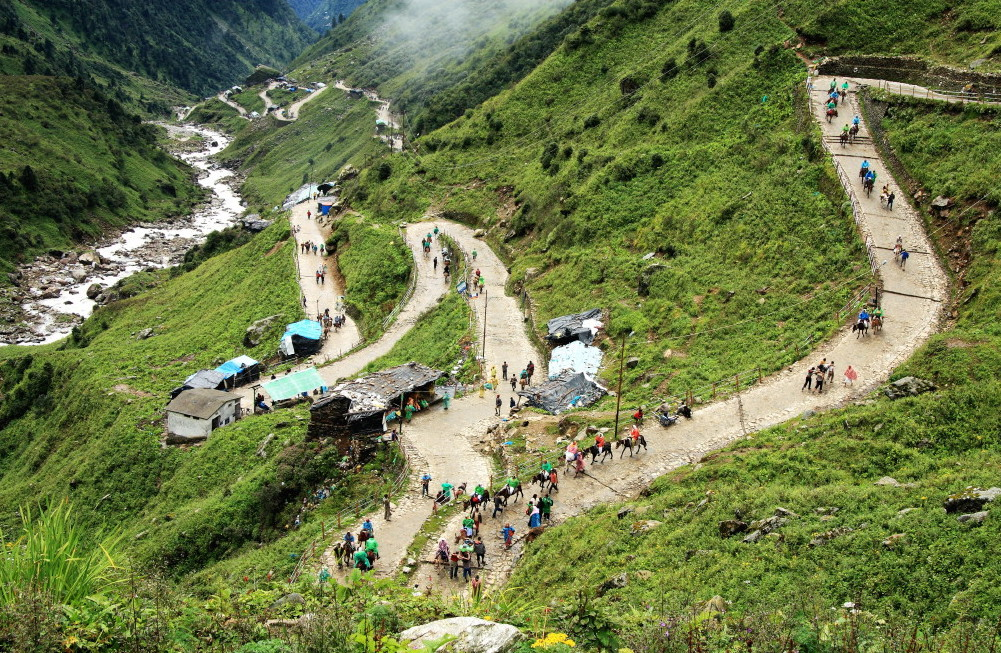
Pilgrimage to Kedarnath

Yatra (Sanskrit: यात्रा, lit. 'journey, procession', IAST: Yātrā), in Indian-origin religions, Hinduism, Buddhism, Jainism and Sikhism, generally means a pilgrimage to holy places such as confluences of sacred rivers, sacred mountains, places associated with Hindu epics such as the Mahabharata and Ramayana, and other sacred pilgrimage sites. Visiting a sacred place is believed by the pilgrim to purify the self and bring one closer to the divine. The journey itself is as important as the destination, and the hardships of travel serve as an act of devotion in themselves.

A tīrtha-yātrā is a pilgrimage to a sacred site. Yatri is the term for anyone who undertakes the yatra.

In present times, yatras are highly organized affairs, with specialized tourism companies catering to yatris. State governments are sometimes involved in the organization of annual yatras, stipulating numbers, registering yatris, and regulating yatri traffic. The Hindu sacred month of Shravan is also the time of the annual Kanwar Yatra, the annual pilgrimage devotees of Shiva, known as Kanwaria, make to Hindu pilgrimage places of Haridwar, Gaumukh and Gangotri in Uttarakhand to obtain water from the Ganges River. In 2003, 55 lakh (5.5 million) pilgrims visited Haridwar. Other Tirtha pilgrimages are Char Dham Yatra, which involves Badrinath, Kedarnath, Gangotri, and Yamunotri; Amarnath yatra in Jammu and Kashmir.

There are numerous pilgrimage sites in India and elsewhere.

== Types of yatras ==
Reasons for going on a yatra may be in response to one's prayers being fulfilled.

In order of importance, in India there are 7 Sapta Puri holy cities, 4 Dhams (Char Dham) and 12 Jyotirlings devoted to Shiva, 51 Shakta pithas devoted to the feminine manifestation of the god, and the important Rama circuit (Ayodhya, Chitrakoot, Hampi and Rameswaram) and Krishna circuit (Braj, Kurukshetra and Dwarka).

Holiest cities: Sapta Puri are Ayodhya, Mathura, Haridwar, Varanasi, Kanchipuram, Ujjain and Dwarka. Kurukshetra, includes Jyotisar where Bhagavad Gita was revealed, is another holy city.

Holy rivers: The ghats of holiest rivers are sacred, including Ganges, Yamuna, Sarasvati River (Ghaggar River), Narmada etc.

Holy mountains: such as Mount Kailash, Badrinath, Kedarnath, Gangotri, and Yamunotri, Sarasvatotri, etc.

Holy tirthas (places): such as Char Dham and Himalayan Chota Char Dham (Badrinath, Kedarnath, Gangotri, and Yamunotri), and Varanasi, Prayagraj, Haridwar-Rishikesh, Mathura-Vrindavan, Ayodhya, Ujjain, Dwarka and Rameswaram. See also Tirtha and Kshetra. Shakambhari temple Saharanpur, Uttar Pradesh

- Sacred river circuit: Yatra to and parikrama of sacred rivers include Ganges, Yamuna, Sarasvati, Narmada, etc.

Holy fairs and Hindu festivals: The Kumbh Mela (the "pitcher festival") is one of the holiest of Hindu pilgrimages that is held four times every 12 years rotating among the four cities of Prayagraj, Haridwar, Nashik, and Ujjain. The Mahamaham in temple town of Kumbakonam is also celebrated once in 12 years. Annual Gita Mahotsav at Kurukshetra, Shravani Mela at Deoghar, and Pitrapaksha Mela at Gaya are also notable holy fairs.

Holy temples: Examples are the Char Dham of Rameswaram, Dwarka, Puri and Badrinath; Katra, home to the Vaishno Devi temple; Puri is home to the Vaishnava Jagannath temple and Rath Yatra celebration; Tirumala – Tirupati, home to the Tirumala Venkateswara Temple; Sabarimala home to Swami Ayyappan; the 108 Divya Desams; the Shakta pithas; the twelve Maha Jyotirlingas; the seven Sapta Puri; the Pancha Bhoota Stalam.

Holy processions: 'Yatra' can also be described as a procession, or any festival which figures a procession, such as Kanwar Yatra and Rath Yatra. In Rath Yatra, chariots are pulled in parade down the streets of Puri in Orissa. In modern times the word can be used to denote marches or demonstrations, for political, environmental or societal causes. The terms 'jatra' and 'zatra' are derived from yatra.

Holy deities: Kuladaivat Hindu families have their own family patron deity. This deity is common to a lineage, a clan or a locality.

Samadhis (shrines) of Sadhus (Saints): Alandi, Samadhi of Dnyaneshwar: Mantralayam, samadhi of Raghavendra Tirtha, Belur Math which enshrine that holy remains of Sri Ramakrishna, Sri Sarada Devi, Swami Vivekananda Puri, and other direct Disciples of Sri Ramakrishna, Tulsi Ghat, Varanasi where Saint Tulsidas left his mortal coil, Samadhi Mandir of Saint Kabir at Gorakhpur, near Varanasi, Panchaganga Ghat, Varanasi where Trailanga Swami lived and left his mortal body, Karar Ashram, Puri where Swami Sri Yukteswar Giri, attained the Mahasamadhi.

== Important national pilgrimage circuits of Indic-religions ==
A yatra or pilgrimage across a much larger area covering multiple faraway cities or sites, related to a specific deity or theme, are called the "circuit". Three most important Hindu-Buddhist "Rahtriya yatra" (national pilgrimage circuit) are related to the important figures such as Rama, Krishna, Buddha, and Guru Nanak, where they had personally visited are as follows.

- Hindu circuit, many of which are also related to greatest Hindu empires and dynasties.
  - Fairs and festivals
    - Kumbh Mela
      - Barahachhetra – a semi-Kumbh Mela in Sunsari Nepal
      - Mahamaham – the Tamil Kumbh Mela
    - Gita Mahotsav
    - Maghi – a Sikh festival recognised by Guru Amar Das
    - Pushkaram – the river festivals of Karnataka, Andhra Pradesh and Telangana
    - Pushkar Fair – the springtime fair in Rajasthan, includes the tradition of a dip in the Pushkar lake
  - Krishna circuit:
    This prikarma entails the Vraja Parikrama, 48 kos parikrama of Kurukshetra, Dwarka, Bhalka (place of death of Krishna).
  - Rama circuit – Ram Van Gaman Path:
    This prikarma entails Ayodhya, Chitrakoot, Hampi and Rameswaram.
  - Sapta Puri, 7 holiest Hindu cities in India viz. Ayodhya, Mathura, Haridwar, Varanasi, Kanchipuram, Ujjain, Dwarka.
  - Shakta pithas
  - Shiva circuits
    - Char Dham, holiest pilgrimage circuit of 4 sites viz. Badrinath, Dwaraka, Puri and Rameswaram.
    - Chota Char Dham, smaller pilgrimage circuit of 4 sites in Uttarakhand viz. Yamunotri, Gangotri, Kedarnath, and Badrinath.
    - Maha Jyotirlinga, 12 holiest Shiva lingam temples in India.
    - Mount Kailash and Lake Manasarovar yatra circuit.
- Buddha circuit:
  These prikarma entails the following:
  - places Lord Buddha stayed,
  - Buddhist pilgrimage sites in India and Nepal which cover prominent historic Buddhist sites at Lumbini, Bodh Gaya, Sarnath, Sravasti (Jetavana), Rajgir Hills, Kurukshetra (Bodh Stupa on bank of Brahma Sarovar, pilgrimage undertaken by Buddha), Shrughna (Yamunanagar, vihara visited by Buddha for sermon), Adi Badri (saraswati udgam sthal and vihara visited by Buddha), Parinirvana Stupa (place of death and nirvana of Buddha at Kushinagar, and Sankissa.
  - Japan has but many Buddhism related pilgrim yatras, such as Shikoku Pilgrimage, eighty-eight temples pilgrimage in the Shikoku island, Japan 100 Kannon Pilgrimage.
- Sikh circuit:
  This prikarma entails the following:
  - Panj Takht, namely Golden Temple, Takht Sri Patna Sahib, Nanded Hazur Sahib, Takht Sri Damdama Sahib Bhatinda, and Anandpur Sahib.
  - Guru Nanak's birth and death places at Gurdwara Janam Asthan and Kartarpur Corridor (both in Pakistan), his travels called udasi.
  - Martyrs's places at Gurudwara Sis Ganj Sahib and Fatehgarh Sahib of martyrdom of Guru Tegh Bahadur and children of Guru Gobind Singh respectively by Muslim rulers for refusing to convert to Islam.
  - Place of pilgrims by Sikh Gurus: Kurukshetra, Kapal Mochan, Paonta Sahib, etc.
  - Capitals of important Sikh states: Lahore (capital of largest Sikh state of Maharaja Ranjit Singh) and Lohgarh (capital of Sikh state founded by Baba Banda Bahadur in Yamunanagar).
  - Fateh Burj at Chapar Chiri where Banda bahadur defeated mughals in Battle of Chappar Chiri and avenged murder of Sikh gurus and their children.
- Jain circuit:
  - Many of the Jain tirthas are related to the Tirthankara, or
  - they are among the newly constructed largest Jain temples.

== Famous yatras ==
=== 48 kos parikrama of Kurukshetra ===
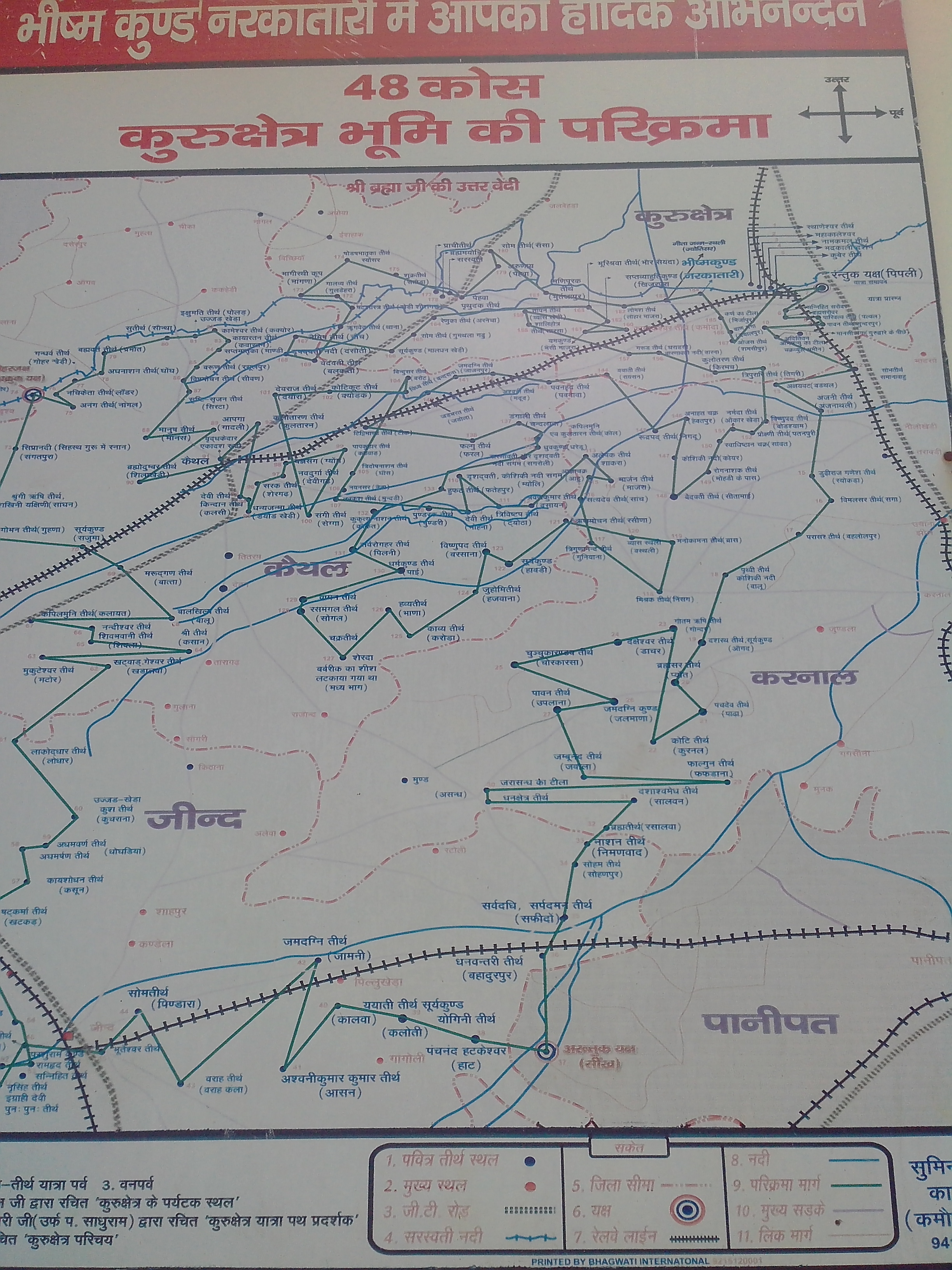
48 kos parikrama route related to Krishna and Mahabharata in and around Kurukshetra in Haryana

48 kos parikrama of Kurukshetra, phrase meaning a 48 kos circumambulation parikrama of various Mahabharata-related and other pilgrimage sites, around the holy city of Kurukshetra in the state of Haryana, India. Within Kurukshetra, along with Brahma Sarovar, other important sites are Jyotisar (place of "Gitaupadesha" – the first Upadeśa or discourse of Bhagavad Gita by Krishna) and Sannihit Sarovar (Hindu genealogy registers of Kurukshetra are kept here). Since this is a site associated with the Mahabharata, it is an important place of pilgrimage for Hindus. It is one of 3 main pilgrimage sites related to "Krishna" circuit. The other two being, "Braj parikarma" in Mathura, Uttar Pradesh and "Dwarka parkarma" (Dwarkadish yatra) at Dwarkadhish Temple in Gujarat.

=== 84 Kosi Parikrama ===
The 84-Kosi Yatra is a tradition in Hindu religion that has been there for thousands of years with the belief that it gives deliverance to the performer from the cycle of 84-Lakh Yonis (the cycle of birth and death). According to Hindu belief, the king of Ayodhya performed the "yagna" in the "treta period" at a place in Makhurha in Basti district of Uttar Pradesh which included circumnavigating the six districts in the region. Some religious leaders believe that the right place to start the parikrama should be Basti instead of Ayodhya. According to some, the dates for 84-Kosi Yatra are fixed and takes place in the month of Chaitra.

=== Mithila Madhya Parikrama ===
Mithila Madhya Parikrama is an annual fifteen days journey of the central part of ancient Mithila. It is the ancient circular circuit of the capital city of Mithila. In Treta Yuga, Lord Rama and Princess Sita took a circle journey of the capital of Mithila after their marriage in the court of King Janaka in Mithila. This Yatra is held every year in the month of Falgun in Hindu calendar.

=== Sitamarhi Dham Parikrama ===
Sitamarhi Dham Parikrama is an annual nineteen days spiritual journey of some Hindu religious destinations in the region of the Sitamarhi district. It is organised to aware the importance of the Janaki Navami festival.

=== Amarnath Yatra ===
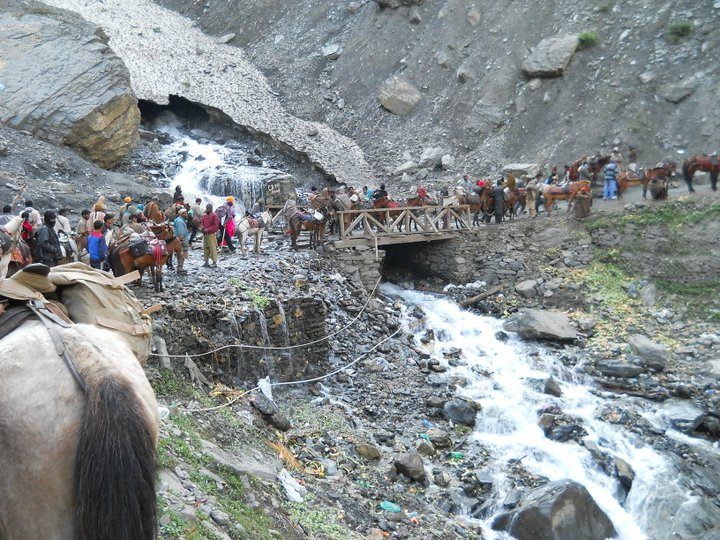
Pilgrims crossing a narrow bridge to the holy shrine of Amarnath

The Amarnath Temple in Jammu and Kashmir is dedicated to Shiva, one of the trinity of gods. The temple is on Amarnath Peak, and is among the most famous shrines in Hinduism. Every year inside the main Amarnath cave an ice Shiva lingam forms, along with two other ice formations representing Ganesha and Parvati. Amarnath yatra is held every year to pay homage to Shiva and Parvati. The temple is a very popular yatra destination for Hindus; about four lakh people visit during the season.

=== Brij Yatra ===
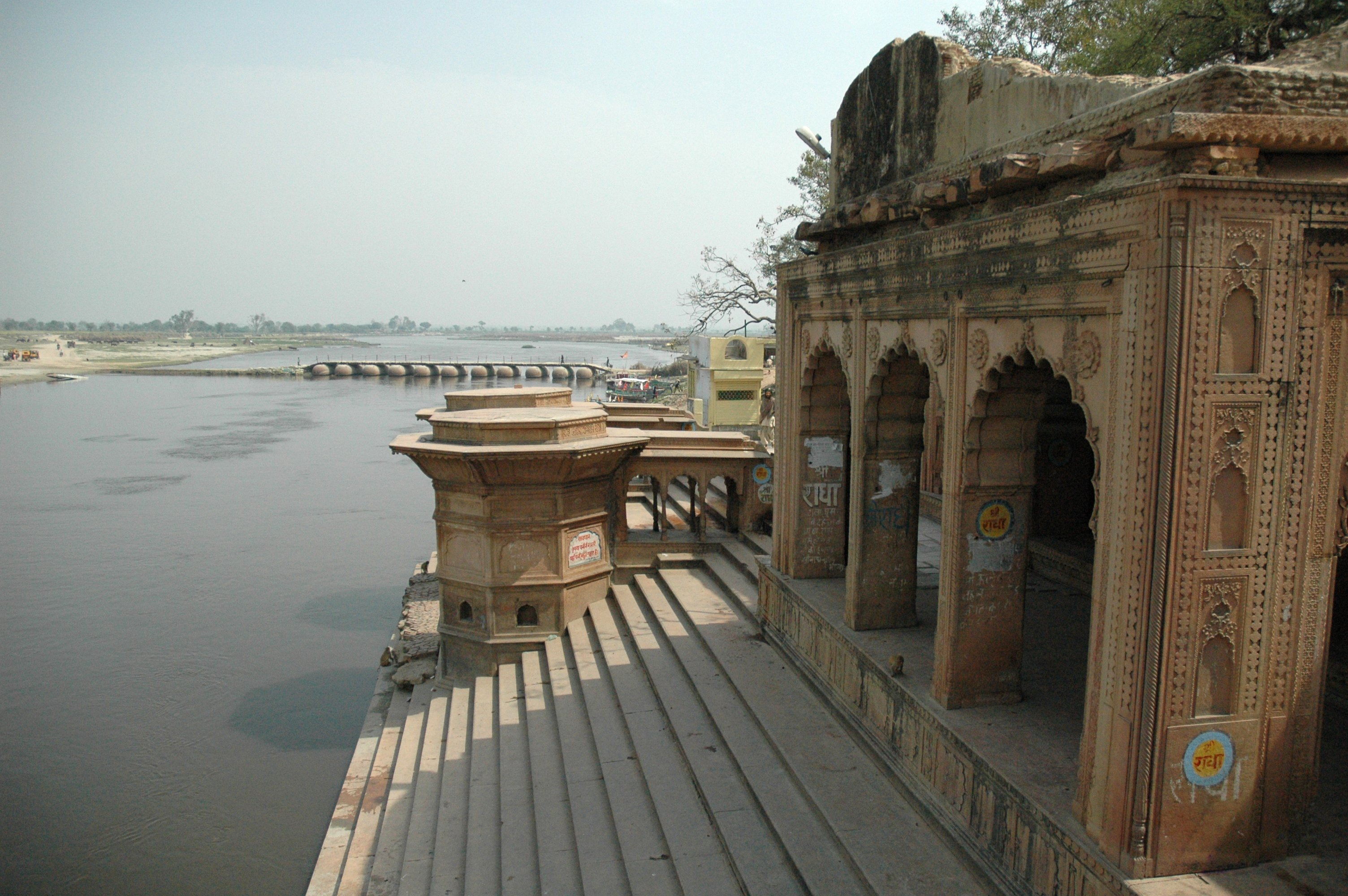
Kesi Ghat in vrindavan in the Yamuna River

Vraja Parikrama circuit of pilgrimage was formally established by the 16th century sadhus of vaishnava sampradaya with fixed routes, itinerary and rituals. The circuit covers is spread across 2500 km^{2} area with 84 kos or 300 km long periphery extending 10 km to east and 50 km to north and west. Braj has two main types of pilgrimage circuits, the traditional longer "Braj Yatra" encompassing the whole circuit, and the other shorter significantly modified contemporary point-to-point pilgrimage to visit the main sites at Mathura, Vrindavan, Gokul, Govardhan. The former, longer traditional pilgrimage route, also includes additional sacred sites Nandgaon and Barsana with travel on foot.

=== Char Dham Yatra ===
The Chardham or "four divine abodes" includes four major pilgrimage places in India. These include Badrinath in the Himalayas, Dwarka in the west, Jagannath Puri in the east, and Rameshwaram in the south.The best time to visit the Char Dham Yatra is generally from late April to June, when the weather remains relatively pleasant and suitable for travel. The Char Dham is often considered the most revered sites for Hindus that have to be visited in one's lifetime. There is a Chota Char Dham as well includes Yamunotri, Gangotri, Badrinath, and Kedarnath situated in Garhwal Himalayas.

=== Deoghar Yatra ===
Deoghar means abode of the gods and goddesses. It is also known as Baidyanath Dham or Baba Dham situated on the eastern side of Jharkhand. The Baidyanath Temple is located here containing one of the twelve Shiva Jyothirlingams in India. The pilgrims carry the holy water of holy river Ganges from Sultanganj's and offered to the Jyotirlingam of Shiva at Deoghar. These pilgrims called Kanwariya, reciting Bol Bam on the way of walk 109 km, The march of Kanwariya start during the holy month of Shravan the wet season each year in India. Shravani Mela is the most celebrated 30-day festival in Baidyanath Temple Temple of Jharkhand.

=== Kailash-Mansarovar Yatra ===
Mansarovar is a fresh-water lake in Tibet near Mount Kailash, and both are places of pilgrimage attracting religious people from India and neighboring countries. The mountain is considered a sacred place in four religions: Hinduism, Buddhism, Jainism, and Bon. According to Hindu mythology, Mount Kailash is the abode of Shiva and circumambulating Mount Kailash on foot is a holy ritual. Another lake called Lake Rakshastal lying close to the west of Lake Manasarovar and The Great Mount Kailash. These lakes are the source of the Brahmaputra River and the Karnali River, a tributary of the river Ganges.

=== Kanwar Yatra ===
The Kanwar Yatra is an annual pilgrimage of devotees of Shiva, known as Kānwarias, to Hindu pilgrimage places of Haridwar, Gaumukh and Gangotri in Uttarakhand and Sultanganj in Bihar to fetch holy waters of Ganges River. Millions of participants gather sacred water from the Ganga and carry it across hundreds of miles to dispense as offerings in their local Śhiva shrines, or specific temples such as Pura Mahadeva and Augharnath temple in Meerut, and Kashi Vishwanath, Baidyanath, and Deoghar in Jharkhand.

=== Kashi yatra ===
At Kashi Yatra, it is customary for every Hindu to undergo Kashi yatra on barefoot. Pilgrims also visit Gaya to do Gaya Shraddha to their ancestors. Details regarding how to perform various rituals, the greatness of Kashi Kshetra. Importance of Kashi yatra is said in Kasi-Khand of Skanda Purana.

=== Pandharpur yatra of Maharashtra ===
Pandharpur yatra is one of the most popular festivals in India. The annual yatra to the famous Vithoba temple at Pandharpur is held every year during the month of June and July. Thousands of pilgrims come to Pandharpur carrying litters with the images of Jñāneśvar from Alandi, Tukaram from Dehu, Eknath from Paithan, and Nivruttinath from Trimbakeshwar. These pilgrims are referred to as Varkaris.

=== Ratha Yatra ===
Among the Ratha Yatra at various sacred sites, the most popular one is Jagannath Rath jatra at Puri in Odisha. Other popular Rath Yatras are Dhamrai Jagannath Roth, Rathayatra of Mahesh, Manipur Ratha Yatra in Manipur which was started in 19th century and ISKCON Ratha Yatra in more than 100 places across the world.

The Festival of Chariots of Jagannatha is held every year at Puri in the state of Orissa. The ten-day ratha yatra commemorates Jagannath's annual visit to Gundicha Mata's temple a short distance away. Thousands of pilgrims come to Puri during the festival with a desire to help pull Jagannath's chariot with ropes. This is the only day when devotees who are normally not allowed in the temple premises, such as non-Hindus and foreigners, can get their glimpse of the deities.

== Gallery ==
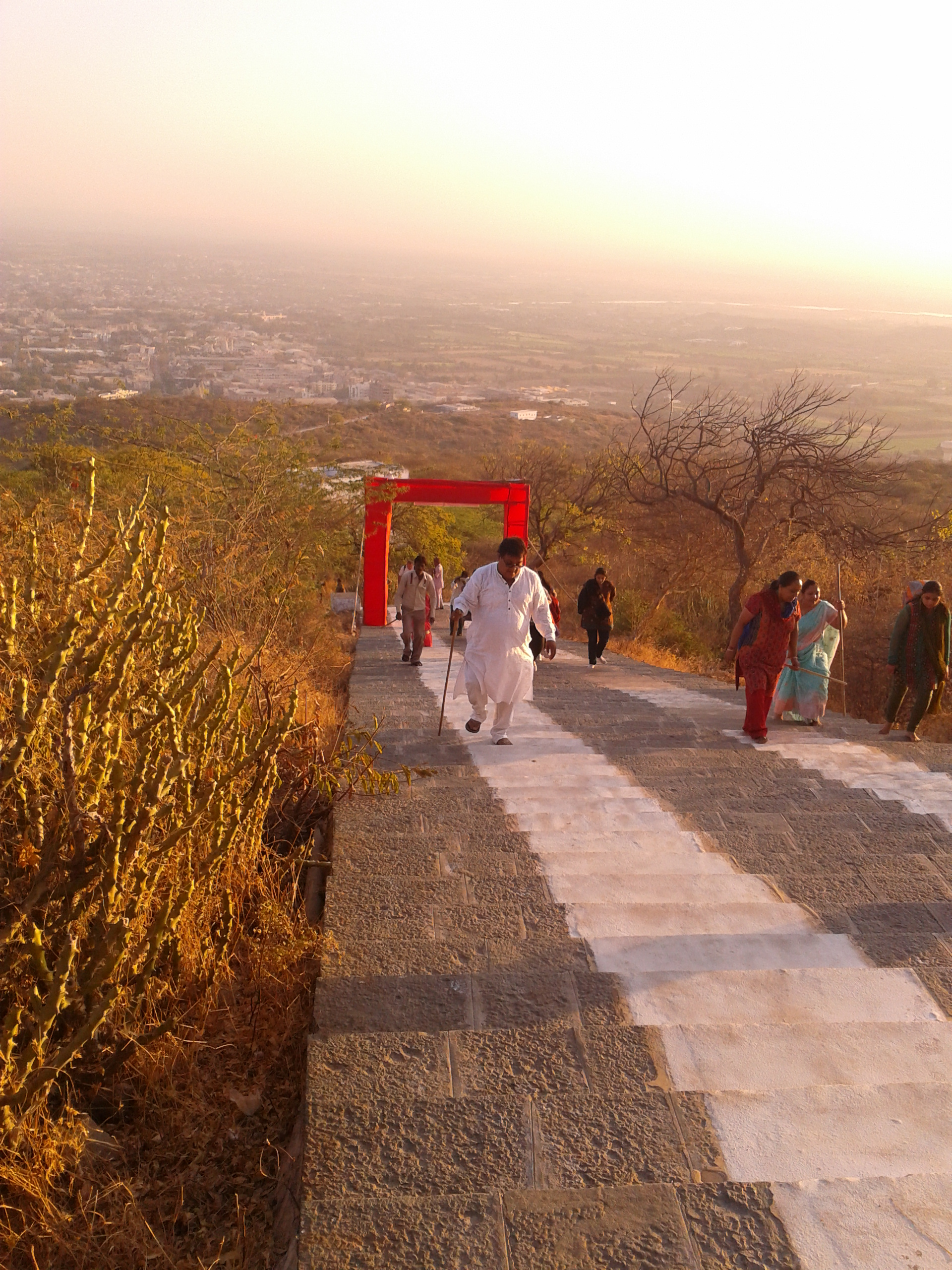
Pilgrims climbing the stairs of Shatrunjaya Maha Tirth

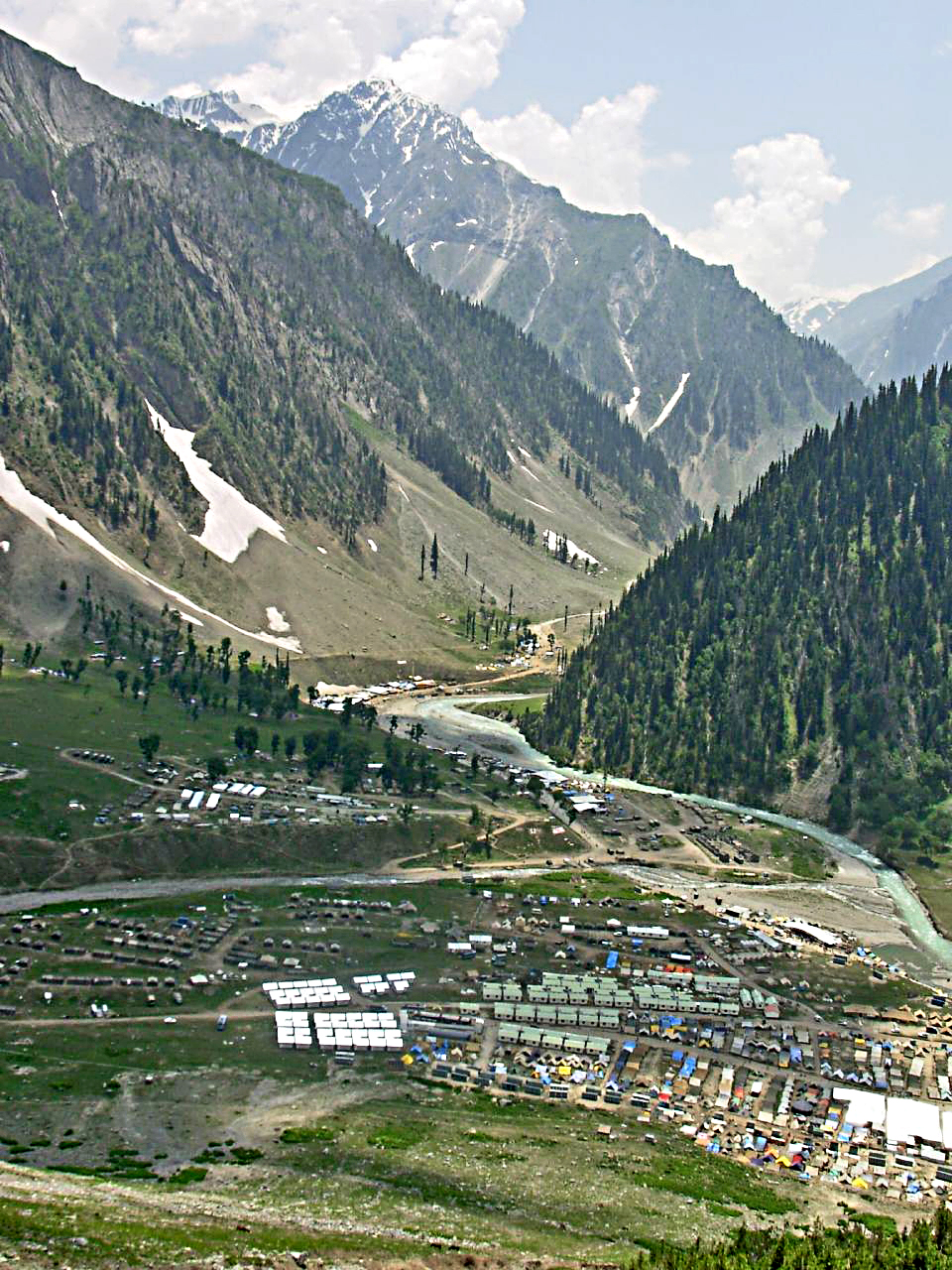
Amarnath Yatra camp

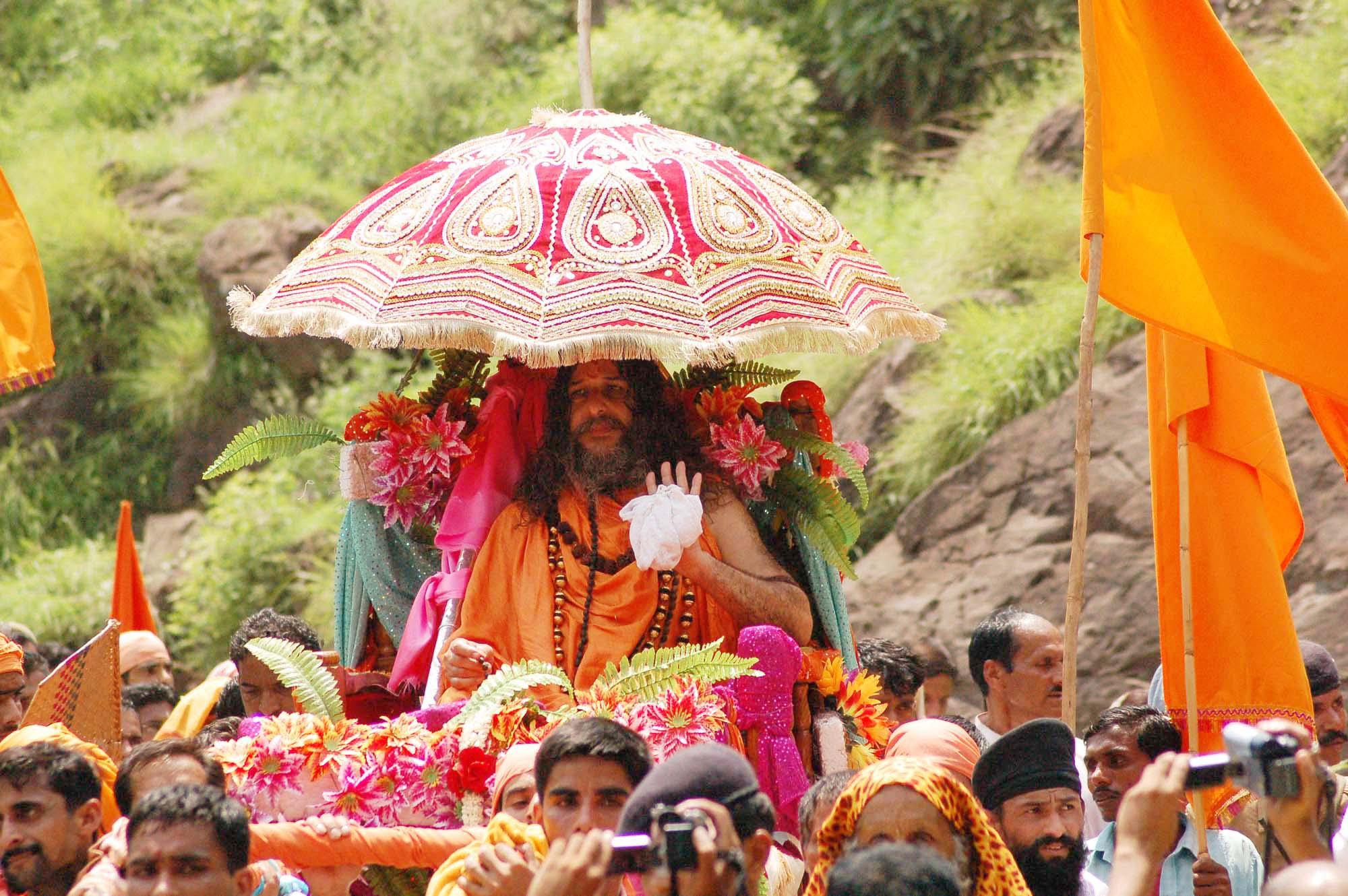
Buddha Amarnath Yatra procession, Poonch

== See also ==
- Hindu pilgrimage sites in India
- List of Hindu festivals
- Padayatra
- Parikrama
- Religious tourism in India
- Tirtha and Kshetra
