= Kattaikkuttu =

Traditional theatre of Tamil Nadu, India

Kattaikkuttu [கட்டைக்கூத்து]
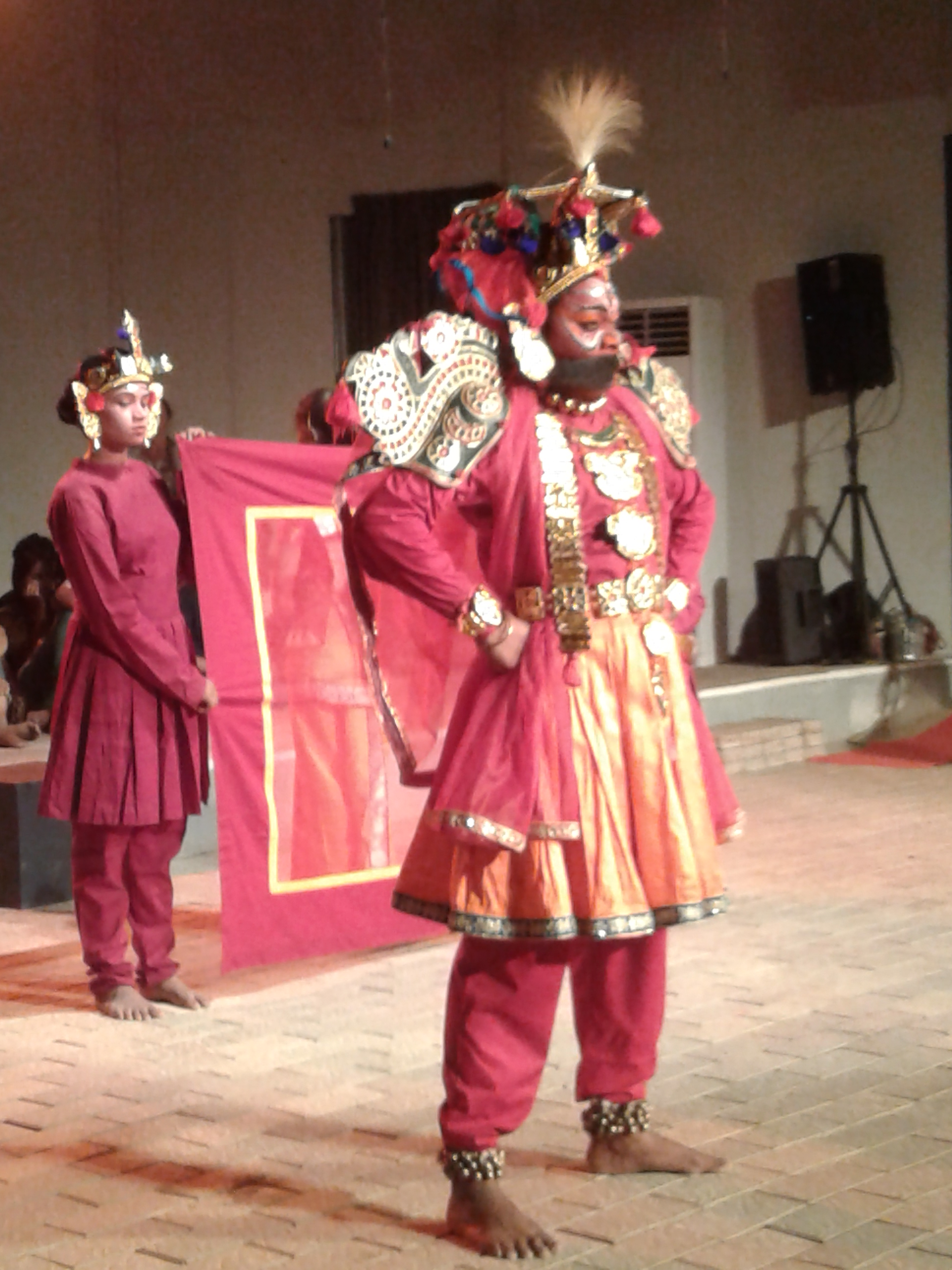
- Kattaikkuttu performance, Kochi
- Stylistic origins: [Tamil ensemble theatre] [Musical theatre] [Total theatre]
- Cultural origins: Tamilakam

Kattaikkuttu [கட்டைக்கூத்து] is a rural, Tamil-language based, physical and vocal form of ensemble theatre form practised in the State of Tamil Nadu in South India. It is a form of Kūttu (also spelled as Koothu), a theatre art that originated in early Tamilakam, though we are not sure what exactly the form and content of this theatre. The performers – by tradition only men – sing, act and dance and the musicians accompany them on the harmonium, the mridangam and dholak, and the mukavinai. The terms Terukkūttu [தெருக்கூத்து which translates as street theatre] and Kaṭṭaikkūttu are often used interchangeably. However, historically the two terms appear to have distinguished, at least in certain villages, between two different kinds of performance: while Terukkuttu referred to mobile performances by two actors participating in a procession for the village deity Mariamman, Kattaikkuttu denotes overnight, narrative performances at a fixed performance space acted by an ensemble of about fifteen actors and musicians.

== History ==
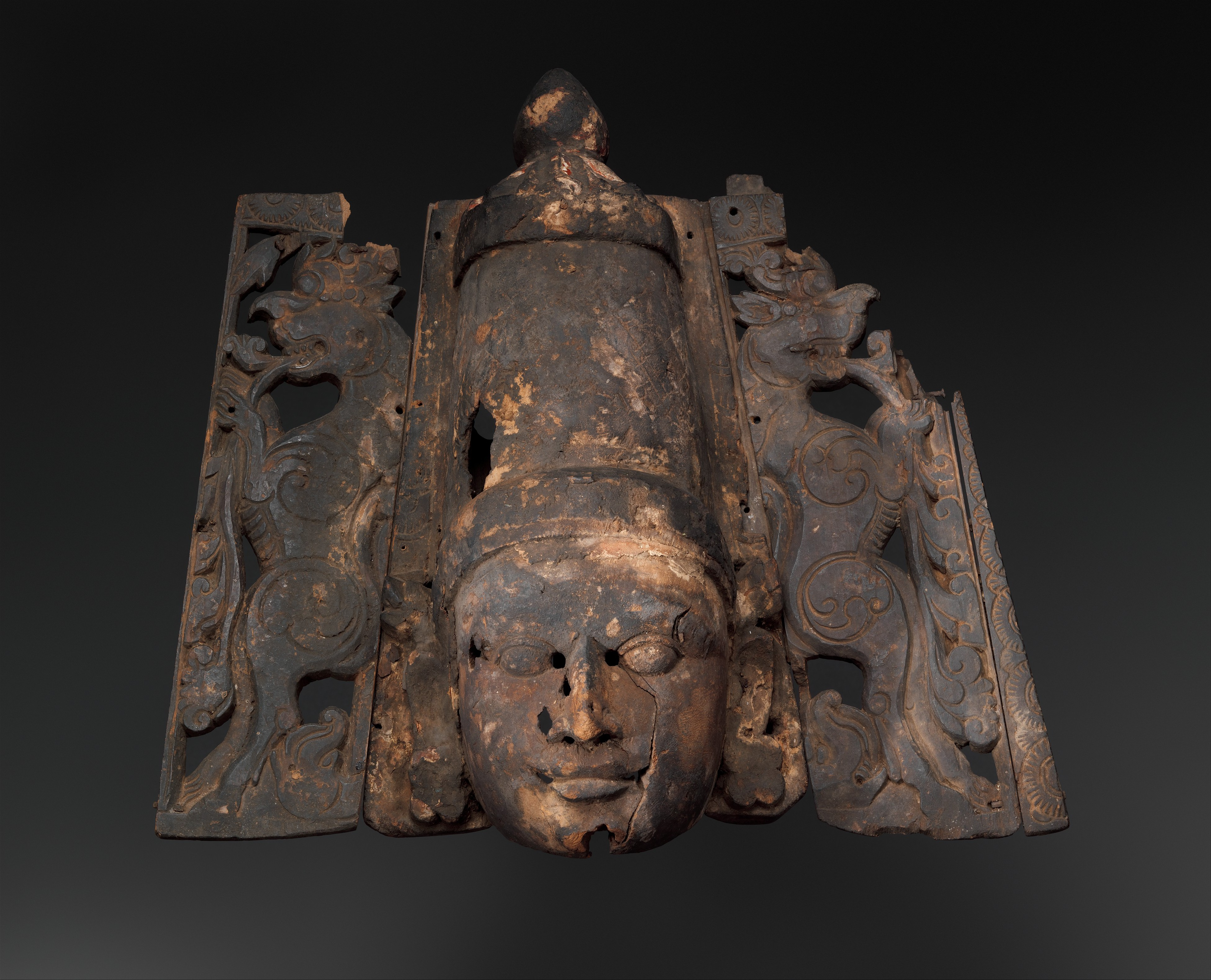
An Koothu performer's mask depicting a character, circa 1700–1750.

Kattaikkuttu derives its name from the word kattai, which refers to the special ornaments worn by the actors during performances; kuttu refers to theatre. The audience recognizes the various characters by the shapes of their headwear and their make-up.

Kattaikkuttu has been performed in rural Tamil Nadu for years. In November 1990, a group of seventeen rural actors and musicians founded, on the initiative of Kattaikkuttu actor Perungattur P. Rajagopal, an organization to promote their theatre in the town of Kanchipuram in Tamil Nadu. They called this grassroots collective the Tamil Nadu Kattaikkuttu Kalai Valarcci Munnerra Sangam using the name of Kattaikkuttu rather than one of the current terms of Kuttu or Terukkuttu. The main objectives of the Sangam – an officially registered society – were to promote Kattaikkuttu as a theatre form in its own right and to further the interests of professional performers. Since its inception more than twenty years ago, the Sangam has developed into an umbrella organization with a number of activities including educating and training a future generation of young, talented Kattaikkuttu performers (the Kattaikkuttu Gurukulam), opening up the theatre to rural girls and women, organization of an annual theatre festival and production of new and often innovative plays. In 2009 the organization shortened its name into Kattaikkuttu Sangam.

== Repertory ==
Many traditional performances centre on the enactment of parts of the Mahabharata; a few plays have Purana stories as their theme. To cater to a renewed interest in the theatre from urban audiences and cultural institutions, new plays of shorter and all-night duration have also been created. These plays have been successfully performed in Indian metros and abroad and have been assimilated into the repertory of the Kattaikkuttu Gurukulam’s Young Professionals Company.

A few of the core plays of the traditional Kattaikkuttu repertory are:

- The Bending of the Bow or Draupadi’s Marriage
- Subhadra’s Marriage
- The Royal Sacrifice
- The Disrobing of Draupadi
- Arjuna’s Penance
- Kichaka’s Battle
- Krishna’s Embassy
- Karna Moksham
- The Eighteenth Day (featuring Duryodhana’s death on the battlefield of Kurukshetra)
- Dakshya’s Sacrifice
- HiranyaVilasam

Kattaikkuttu is usually performed in a religious setting and performances take place overnight: they start around 10pm and run until 6am the next morning. The occasions for Kattaikkuttu performances can be divided into the following categories:

1. Paratam (Mahabharata) festivals in honor of the Goddess
2. Other village festivals such as those for Mariyamman, Ankalamman, Shiva and Vishnu
3. Rites of individuals such as death rites
4. Secular occasions e.g. cultural festivals

The Kattaikkuttu Gurukulam is regularly visited by prominent scholars in the theatre world--for example, Bennington College professor Sue Rees regularly visits the school to produce short videos and documentaries short videos and documentaries which feature various Kattaikkuttu works.

== Style ==
Kattaikkuttu derives its name from the fact that a specific category of actors wear the so-called kattai or kattai samankal. Kattai are wooden head, shoulder and the breast ornaments inlaid with mirror work. The kattai represent power, heroic qualities and royalty. The kattai-wearers represent superhuman – divine or demonic – warriors who are the main agents in the mythological battles around which the performances are built.

The acting arena is an open rectangular ground and the audience sits on three sides of the ground. The singers and the instrument players occupy the rear of the stage. The play begins with a musical introduction and songs in praise to several different deities. The first character to appear on stage is the clown or Kattiyakkaran (literally Praise Maker). The Kattiyakkaran is central to Kattaikkuttu performances: he provides entertainment, serves as the guardian of and opposite number for the principal characters and translates events from the epic and Puranic stories into everyday life experiences of the rural audiences. After his comic introduction, the Kattiyakkaran announces the title of the play to be performed and the entry of one of the principal characters. The stage entry of most kattai characters takes place behind a curtain held across the stage by two assistant performers. Such a curtain entry requires the actor to perform a prescribed routine of songs and dance. All Kattaikkuttu actors sing themselves, supported by the chorus.

T.N. Krishna with kattaikoothu performance at Kochi muzirix Biennale 2018

== About the Gurukulam ==
The Kattaikkuttu Gurukulam was founded in October 2002 by actor, playwright, and director P. Rajagopal and Dr. Hanne M. de Bruin to preserve and enhance the scope of the Kattaikkuttu theatre and safeguard the artistic and economic position of its future exponents. The students are marginalized, young rural people between 5 and 20 years with a keen interest in the theatre form. Located 8 kilometres away from Kanchipuram in a small village called Punjarasantankal, the Kattaikkuttu Gurukulam follows the guru-shishya system of transmission. This means that students and teachers are in constant close contact with each other in formal and informal settings. The Gurukulam's students are tutored in life and in all aspects of the Perungattur style of Kattaikkuttu apart from receiving a formal education.

The Kattaikkuttu Gurukulam came under the auspices of the Kattaikkuttu Sangam. It ran its own theatre company, the Kattaikkuttu Young Professionals consisting of senior students and graduates of the Gurukulam. The girl students of the Kattaikkuttu Gurukulam have their own ensemble, the Kattaikkuttu All-Girls Company, which serves as a laboratory to experiment with gender-sensitive issues.

After 18 years since its inception, the Gurukulam was shut down in March of 2020, with a vision to becoming an indigenous Kattaikkuttu Knowledge Centre. The Knowledge Centre will reach out to a wider and more diverse audience, facilitating the sharing of artistic knowledge between different art forms.
