= Tirtha (Hinduism) =

Hindu pilgrimage sites

Tirtha (Sanskrit: तीर्थ, tīrtha) is a Sanskrit word that means "crossing place, ford", and refers to any place, text or person that is holy. It particularly refers to pilgrimage sites and holy places in Hinduism, Buddhism, and Jainism.

The process or journey associated with tirtha is called tirtha-yatra, while alternate terms such as kshetra, gopitha and mahalaya are used in some Hindu traditions to refer to a "place of pilgrimage".

== Tirtha ==
Tirtha: Holy Pilgrimage

Tirtha are of three kinds,
Jangam Tirtha is to a place movable,
of a sadhu, a rishi, a guru,
Sthawar Tirtha is to a place immovable,
like Benaras, Hardwar, Mount Kailash, holy rivers,
Manas Tirtha is to a place of mind,
of truth, charity, patience, compassion, soft speech, soul.

— Skanda Purana

Tīrtha (Sanskrit: तीर्थ) literally means "a ford, a "crossing place" in the sense of "transition or junction". Tirtha is a spiritual concept in Hinduism, particularly as a "pilgrimage site", states Axel Michaels, that is a holy junction between "worlds that touch and do not touch each other". The word also appears in ancient and medieval Hindu texts to refer to a holy person, or a holy text with something that can be a catalyst for a transition from one state of existence to another. It is, states Knut A. Jacobsen, anything that has a salvific value to a Hindu, and includes pilgrimage sites such as mountains or forests or seashore or rivers or ponds, as well as virtues, actions, studies or state of mind. Tirtha can be an actual physical sacred location in Hindu traditions, or a metaphorical term referring to meditation where the person travels to an intellectual sacred mind state such as of "truth, forgiveness, kindness, simplicity and such". Tirtha in Hindu texts, states Bhardwaj, is "one of the many ways toward self-realization and bliss". The field of our state of mind is the body, mind, intellect and ego, a quadripartite. Yoga prepares the field to understand God (God's grace).

The word Tirtha is found in the oldest layer, the Samhita of the Rigveda as well as other Vedas. In the hymns of Rigveda, such as 1.169.6 and 4.29.3, the context suggests that the word means "a way or road". In other hymns of Rigveda such as 8.47.11, states Kane, the context suggests the term means "a ford in the river". Yet, in other cases, Tirtha refers to any holy place, such as by the sea, or a place that connects a sacrificial ground (Yajna) to the outside. Later texts use the word Tirtha to refer to any spot, locality or expanse of water where circumstances or presence of great sages or gurus has made special.

In the Upanishads, states Diana L. Eck, the "crossing over" refers to the "spiritual transition and transformation from this world to the world of Brahman, the Supreme, the world illumined by the light of knowledge". The emphasis in the Upanishads, in Tirtha context is on spiritual knowledge, instead of rituals, and this theme appears in the Hindu epics as well.

=== Pilgrimage sites ===
Major sites of Tirtha in India. Orange markers are UNESCO world heritage sites.

The Dharmasastras and the Puranas, states Kane, assert numerous descriptors for what is holy, including all mountains, all of Himalayas, all rivers, lakes, dwellings of Rishis (sages), temples, cowpens, great forests, and all seas. This tradition traces back to the Rigveda, where Aranyani (large forest) is referred to as a deity. The reverence for rivers and water bodies is traceable to the Nadi Stuti, or the river-hymn, in hymn 10.75 of the Rigveda.

Pilgrimage sites are not prominent in Dharmasastras such as Manusmriti and Yajnavalkya Smriti, but they are found in the epic Mahabharata and the Puranas. Most Puranas include large sections on Tirtha Mahatmya along with tourist guides, which describe sacred sites and places to visit, particularly the Padma Purana, Skanda Purana, Vayu Purana, Kurma Purana, Bhagavata Purana, Narada Purana, Devi Bhagavata Purana, Vamana Purana, Linga Purana, Brahma Purana, Brahmanda Purana and Bhavishya Purana.

In ancient texts, Varanasi (Benares, Kashi), Rameshwaram, Kanchipuram, Dwarka, Puri, and Haridwar have been mentioned as particularly holy sites, along with geographies where major rivers meet (sangam) or join the sea. The Kumbhamela, which rotates at a gap of three years, between Prayaga (renamed to Allahabad in the late medieval era), Haridwar, Ujjain and Nasik, remain popular into the modern times, with tens of millions of Hindus participating.

=== Reasons ===
Some pilgrimage are part of a Vrata (vow), which a Hindu may make for a number of reasons. It may mark a special occasion, such as the birth of a baby, or as part of a rite of passage such as a baby's first haircut, or after healing from a sickness. It may, states Eck, also be the result of prayers answered, or consequent to a vow a person had made if his or her prayer were to come true, such as the well being of a family member, or overcoming poverty or destitution or a challenging situation.

Ancient rationale for pilgrimage

Flower-like the heels of the wanderer,
His body groweth and is fruitful,
All his sins disappear,
Slain by the toil of his journeying.

— Aitareya Brahmana 7.15
Rigveda, Translator: AB Keith

An alternate reason for Tirtha, for some Hindus, is to respect wishes or in memory of a beloved person after his or her death. This may include dispersing their cremation ashes in a Tirtha region in a forest, mountain, river or sea to honor the wishes of the dead. The journey to a Tirtha, assert some Hindu texts, helps one overcome the sorrow of the loss.

Another reason for a Tirtha is the Hindu belief that journeys have rejuvenating potential, to purify the inner state of man, and there is spiritual merit in travel, a theme asserted by the Vedic texts. This journey in later Hindu texts, states Bhardwaj, has ranged from the inner journey of meditation to physically traveling to famed temples or bathe in rivers such as the Ganges.

Tirtha has been one of the recommended means of addressing remorse and to perform penance, for unintentional errors and intentional sins, in the Hindu tradition. The effort and austerities during the Tirtha are a part of Prāyaścitta concept, which means "atonement, penance, expiation" for "something one has done, but shouldn't have" or "something one did not do, but should have". Vishnu Dharmasastra asserts that the type of sin that may be expiated through pilgrimages is referred to as anupātakas (small sin), in contrast to mahapātakas (major sin) that require other penances. According to Kane, many texts asserted that "tirtha-yatra (journey to a holy place) was a popular way for redemption of sins in the case of all classes of men and women.

=== Method ===
The proper procedure for a pilgrimage is debated within the smṛtis, with questions such as whether one should cut his hair before a pilgrimage arising or whether a fast at the tīrtha is required.

The mode of travel is also widely discussed, particularly when the Tirtha is undertaken as part of a penance. The most widely accepted view appears to be that the greatest austerity (prāyaścitta) comes from traveling on foot, or part of the journey is on foot, and that the use of a conveyance is only acceptable if the pilgrimage is otherwise impossible.

The Hindu texts assert that the man should take his wife with him, when proceeding to pilgrimage. However, some smṛtis also call attention to the fact that doing one's duty as a householder is more important than going on pilgrimages, and it is only in special cases or once one has paid his Three Debts (to his parents, his teacher, and the Vedas) that he should resort to pilgrimages.

Raghunanda's Prāyaścitta-tattva asserts that the person seeking penance must give up 16 things when he reaches Ganges river, including behavior such as praising another tirtha, striking any one, sexual dalliance, accepting gifts, giving one's used clothing as gifts to others.

== Kshetra ==
A pilgrimage place or location in some Hindu texts is also referred to as Kshetra (IAST: kṣētra, Sanskrit: क्षेत्र), literally any "field, area, tract of land".

A kshetra often refers to a collection of tirtha locations (temples, river banks) in a certain location, such as Varanasi, Hardwar, Somnath, Mathura-Vrindavan, Ayodhya, Puri and Kanchipuram, are referred to as a kshetra.

A kshetra need not be distant permanently developed travel site, and refers to any temporary space, such as a wedding area or mandala set up for a worship, that is sacred. Both yantras and mandalas are sometimes referred to as kshetras.

The Vaishnava Puranas enumerates seven sites as the gates of Moksha: Ayodhya, Mathura, Māyā, Kāsi, Kāñchī, Avantikā (Ujjain), Purī and Dvārāvatī.

== Tirtha monastery ==
The Gosains (Dashnami) credit Adi Shankara for setting up 10 monastic orders in India, of which Tirtha is one and is based in Dwarka, Gujarat in Kalika Matha. The entire list includes Tirtha and Ashrama in Gujarat, Vana and Aranya in Odisha, Giri, Parvata and Sagara in Uttarkhand, Saraswati, Bharati and Puri in Karnataka.

== See also ==
- Kshetram
- Pilgrimage (section Hinduism)
- Hinduism (section Pilgrimage)
- Theertham
- Yatra
- Tirtha (Jainism)
