= Koothu =

Tamil performing folk art

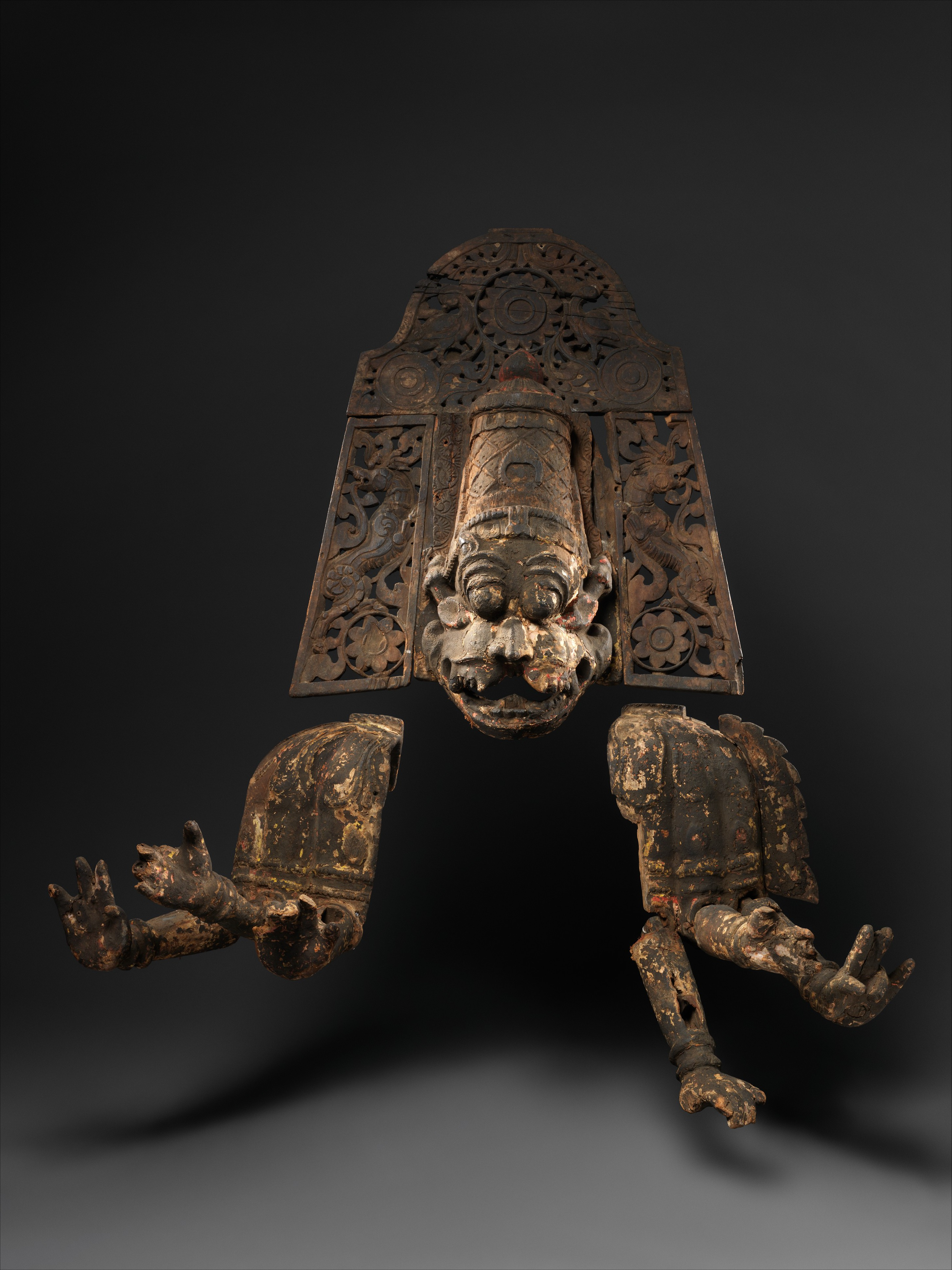
- Koothu costumes, c.1700–1750
- Stylistic origins: Ancient Tamil music, Dance forms of Tamil Nadu
- Cultural origins: Tamilakam
- Derivative forms: Terukkuttu, Kattaikkuttu, Koodiyattam, Chakyar Koothu

Koothu is an ancient Tamil art form, where artists enacted scenes from epics and folklore with dance and music. It is a form of storytelling art that originated in the early Tamilakam, and served as an entertainment and a medium to educate the people about religion and history. Various forms exist such as Terukuttu, Kattaikkuttu, Koodiyattam, and Chakyar Koothu.

== Description ==
Koothu is an ancient Tamil art form, which is a form of drama, where artists enacted scenes from epics and folklore with dance and music. It involves play performance along with narration and singing. Sangam literature such as Silappatikaram provide detailed description of the art form. The stories are drawn from Hindu epics such as Ramayana and Mahabharata, mythology and folklore. Apart from entertainment, koothu also serves as a medium of education to the rural people about religion and history.

== Variations ==
Koothu broadly consists of the art forms of Terukuttu and Kattaikkuttu. Terukkuttu refers to mobile performances in a procession, while Kattaikkuttu denotes narrative performance, often performed overnight, on a fixed performance space. Koothu generally means a performance and is used as a part of the names denoting other specific art forms. These include Nattu Koothu, Kuravai Koothu, and Valli Koothu, which depict scenes from the state and culture of different peoples in Tamil country. Samaya Koothu showcases religious topics, while Porkaala Koothu, Pei Koothu, and Thunangai Koothu are focused on the martial arts and war of the country. Ottan koothu is a tribal ritual dance form based on koothu. Bommalattam, a type of string puppetry, is also referred to as thol pavai koothu (dance of leather dolls). In Kerala, Koothu is performed in combination of Sanskrit theatre performance called Koodiyattam and Chakyar Koothu.

== Performance ==
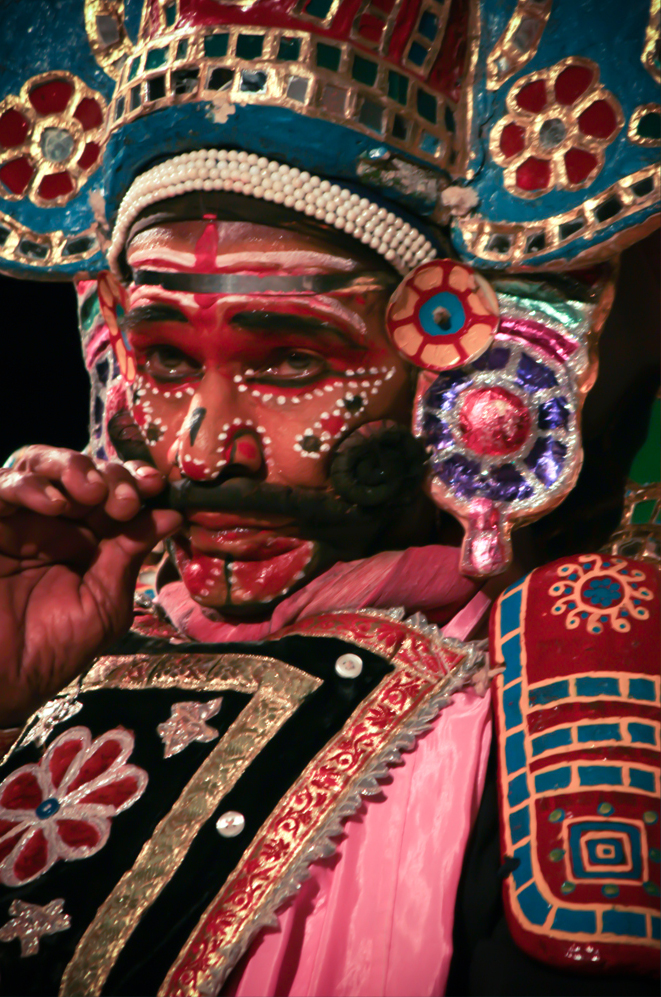
Koothu performer

The performers are called as "koothar". They wear elaborate wooden headgear, special costumes with swirling skirts, ornaments such as heavy anklets along with prominent face painting and make-up. While traditionally the performers have been predominantly male, women have been included in modern times.

The art is a form of street theater, performed during festivals in open public places such as temples or village squares. It is usually dedicated to Hindu goddesses such as Mariamman or Draupadi. The dance is accompanied by music played from traditional instruments and the story is usually narrated by a kattiyakaran in the background during the performance. The artisians often train in a koothu pattarai (theatre workshop) under a nattuvanar (teacher).

== Areas of practice ==
Koothu is an art form which has been practised in Tamil Nadu since the Sangam period. Theater groups such as the Koothu-P-Pattarai have been performing the art form in the 21st century. Dedicated schools such as Kattaikuthu Gurkulam and various training programmes have also been established for training artisans. In the early 2020s, the art form suffered a dip due to the COVID-19 enforced lockdowns, with artists struggling for means to earn a livelihood.

Apart from Tamil Nadu, as Tamils migrated abroad to various countries such as Sri Lanka and Fiji, the art form was carried to those regions. In Fiji, it is called as "tirikutu" in Fiji, and is performed by males during temples festivals.

== See also ==
- Koodiyattam
- Kathakali
- Yakshagana
- Dappankuthu
