= List of Indian folk dances =

Indian folk dances, which typically consist of a few simple steps, are performed throughout the world to celebrate a new season, childbirth, weddings, festivals, and other social occasions. In some Indian folk dances, men and women perform separately; in others, they dance together. On most occasions, the dancers will sing accompanied by musicians. Most folk dances have intricately designed costumes. Although a number of structured, ancient folk and tribal dances exist, many others are evolving.

== Andhra Pradesh ==
The Sutradhari (సూత్రధారి) is the most important actor in a Yakshagana, and plays multiple characters. Yakshaganam evolved into Harikatha, and they are considered synonymous. Their dances are similar; one person plays from excerpts from Palkuriki Somanatha, Srinatha, and others. Harikatha consists of samvaadam (సంవాదం; discussion), padyam (పద్యం; poetry), and daruvu (దరువు; rhythm). It typically begins with "భక్తజనులారా! వినండి హరికథ! వినగ వేడుక గలిగే" ("O devotees! Listen to this Harikatha and be delighted!") Those involved in Harikatha Kalakshepam (హరికథా కాలక్షేపం) are known as Harikatha Dasu (హరికథ దాసు) or Harikatha Bhagavatar (హరికథ భాగవతార్). In Andhra Pradesh, the first Harikatha artist is believed to have been Gokulapati Koormanathakavi (గోకులపాటి కూర్మనాథకవి) from the state's northern districts, who wrote and popularised the Mrityunjaya Vilaasam (మృత్యుంజయ విలాసం).

== Arunachal Pradesh ==
Folk Dances of Arunachal Pradesh
Dance	Community
Aji Lhamu	Monpa
Chalo	Nocte
Hiiri Khaniing	Apatani
Lion and Peacock	Monpa
Pasi Khongki	Adi
Ponung	Adi
Popir	Galo
Buiya	Mishmi
Bardo Chham	Sherdukpen
Loku Bawang	Nocte
Ozele	Wancho
Pakku Itu	Apatani
Eme Relo	Galo

== Assam ==
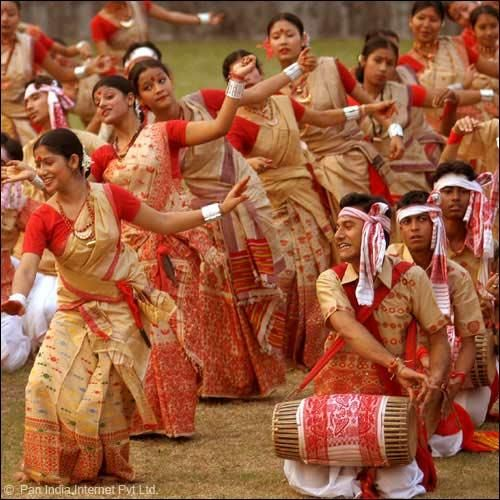
Bihu dance

- Bihu
- Bagurumba
- Bhortala dance
- Baidima
- Goalini
- Jhumur
- Bohuwa dance
- Gumrag
- Oja pali
- Deodhani

== Bihar ==
- Bidesiya is a form of dance-drama that is believed to have been created by Bhikhari Thakur, a barber with a passion for drama. It deals with social issues and conflict between traditional and modern, rich and poor.
- Domkach is performed in the bridegroom's house by women during a marriage ceremony.
- Phagua is a dance and also a type of folk song performed during Holi.
- Jat-Jatin is the most popular folk dance of North Bihar, especially in the Mithila. It is performed by a man and a woman; the man is going far away to work. The dance reflects poverty and sorrow.
- Jhijhiya is sung and danced during Durga Puja in the Mithila region. Folks dance with an earthen pot with holes that have a lamp inside in their heads. It is invoked to ward off evil as well.
- Jhumri is similar to Gujarat's Garba.
- Kajri is popular in Bihar's Bhojpuri-speaking region. It often describes a woman's longing for her lover as the black monsoon cloud hangs in the summer sky, and is sung during the rainy season.
- Paiki evokes the infantry's agility, courage, and excitement. Danced on flat ground, it highlights the dancers' weapon-handling ability.
- Sohar (A Maithili Folk Song) is sung and danced by women to celebrate the birth of a child.

== Chhattisgarh ==
Raut Nacha is a traditional folk dance usually done by Yadavs, a caste which considers itself descendants of Krishna, as an expression of worship. Performed for Dev Udhni Ekadashi (the gods' awakening after a brief rest), it resembles Krishna's raslila. Pandavani, Panthi, Suwa dance is also folk dance.

== Goa ==
- Deknni
- Dhalo
- Fugdi in a Goan folk dance performed by the women in the Konkan region during the Hindu religious festivals Ganesh Chaturthi and Vrata or near the end of other dances, such as Dhalo.
- Khol
- Mussoll

Samayi Nrutya

== Gujarat ==
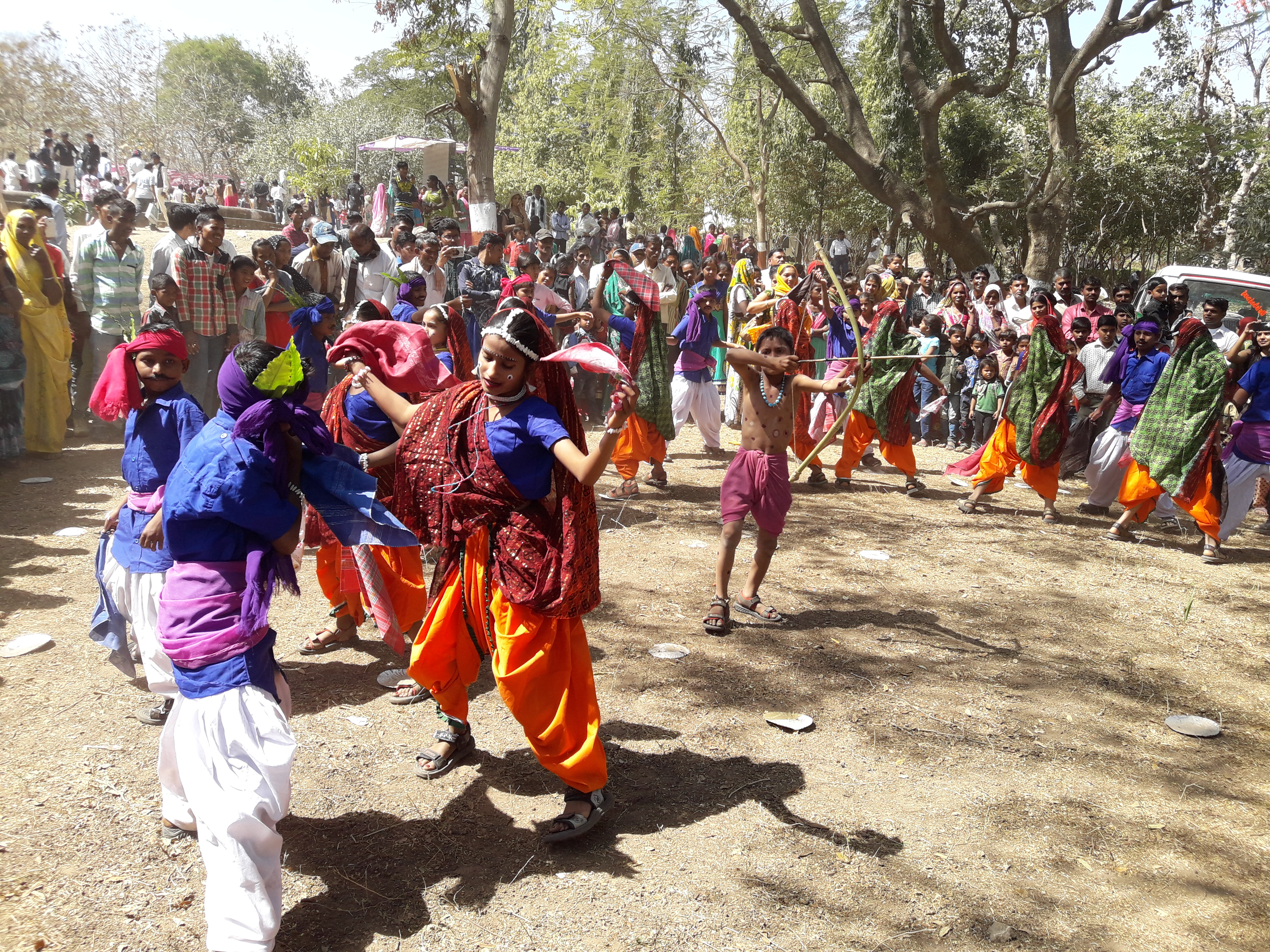
Timli, a Gujarati folk dance performed by Adivasi children in Kaleshwari, Mahisagar

- Dandiya Raas is an energetic, vibrant dance which originated in Gujarat and Rajasthan. Often called the "stick dance" because it uses polished sticks (dandiya), it represents a mock fight between the goddess Durga and the demon king Mahishasura. It is nicknamed "the sword dance" because the dandiya represent Durga's swords and are struck together. The combination of garba and raas has become popular at the collegiate level in the United States, and garba-raas competitions are increasing in number. Popular competitions include Raas Chaos (in Washington D.C.), and Raas Rodeo (in Austin, TX).
- Garba is customarily performed by both sexes, and sometimes includes the stick dance. With circular movements and rhythmic clapping, it is often performed during Navratri. Its name comes from garbha deep, which means "light in the inner temple" or "lamp in a perforated earthen pot" (often used in the dance). Garba which is the renowned folk dance of Gujarat is an integral part of Navratri Celebrations.It has earned the 'Intangible Cultural Heritage of Humanity (ICH) tag from Unesco. The garba of Gujarat is the 15th ICH element from India to be inscribed on the Unesco list.
- The Tippani dance originated in the Chorwad region of Saurashtra. Working women take a wooden rod (sometimes tipped with iron at one end) and beat the floor with it.
- The Padhar dance is performed by the Padhar community.

== Himachal Pradesh ==
Nati is the traditional dance of Himachal Pradesh's Sirmaur, Kullu and Shimla districts. The dance is listed in Guinness World Records as having "the greatest number of people attending and participating in a Nati dance lesson at a single venue". Jhanjar folk dance of Himachal pradesh mainly in Chamba District

== Haryana ==
Dances in Haryana include:

- Theatrical
  - Saang: Pioneering artists were Baje Bhagat, Dayachand Mayna and Lakhmi Chand.
  - Ragini
- Devotional
  - Chaupaiya (in verse)
  - Raslila
  - Ragini
- Seasonal
  - Gogaji and Gugga
  - Phaag,
  - Sawan
  - Teej
- Legendary courage
  - Kissa
- Love and romance
  - Been (including its variant Nāginī dance)
- Ceremonial
  - Dhamal dance
  - Ghoomar
  - Jhoomar
  - Khoria dance
  - Loor dance
  - [Khoria]

== Karnataka ==
- Bharatnatyam is performed in the Mysuru region.
- Buta Kola (spirit worship) is usually practiced at night.
- Dollu Kunitha is a drum dance.
- Hulivesha is performed by men in the coastal region. The dancers are painted like tigers and perform like angry tigers.
- Kamsale, performed by devotees of Male Madeshwara on pilgrimages to the Biligiriranga Hills, is popular throughout the state.
- Kangilu, Mandal community spiritual dance.
- Kolata
- Lavani is performed in the northern border regions.
- Lingada Birana Kunitha is widespread in the southern parts of Karnataka state.
- Veeragase is performed by women. Based on Hindu mythology, it is performed during festivals primarily during the Hindu months of Shravana and Karthika.
- Yakshgana, the state dance, has a number of forms which vary from region to region.
- Lambani Folk songs & Dance

== Jammu and Kashmir ==
The Jammu and Kashmir region is blessed with natural and cultural beauty. The Union Territory of Jammu and Kashmir has many folk dances performed on different occasions.

The main folk dance performed in the Jammu region are- Kud Dance, Chajja Dance, Crow Dance, Dogri Bhangra etc.

Dumhal is a ceremonial dance performed by men of the Wattal tribe. Dancers wear long, colourful robes and tall, conical caps studded with beads and shells. They move in a procession, carrying a banner. The banner is buried and the men dance, forming a circle, accompanied by singing and a drum.

== Jharkhand ==
- Jhumar is a popular dance, performed during the harvest season and its festival.
- Mardani Jhumar, a Nagpuri dance, is primarily performed by men.
- Janani Jhumar is a Nagpuri dance mainly performed by women.
- Domkach is a dance performed during a marriage ceremony by the bride and groom's family.
- Fagua is performed during the festival of Holi.
- Paiki is a nagpuri martial dance.
- Chhau dance is a semi-classical Indian dance with folk traditions which originated in the eastern states of Jharkhand, West Bengal, and Odisha. It has three styles, named for the locations where they are performed: Purulia Chau in Bengal, Seraikella Chau in Jharkhand, and Mayurbhanj Chau in Odisha.
- Firkal is a martial dance, performed in some parts of Jharkhand and Odisha.

== Kerala ==
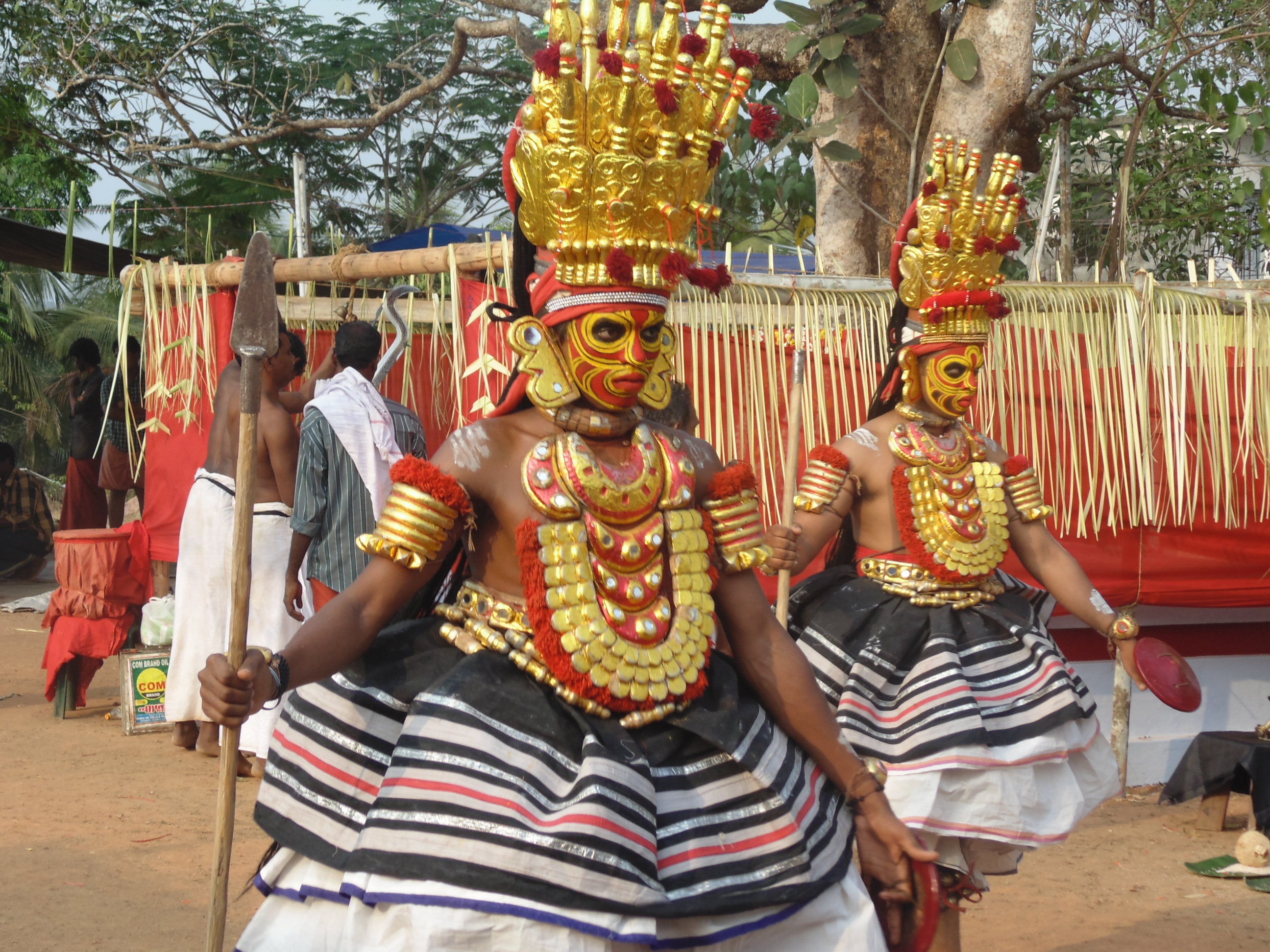
Thirayattam dancers

- Duffmuttu is performed by the Muslim community. Originated by the Arabs, it is accompanied by Arabic music. The name Duffmuttu is attributed to a drum known as a daff or tap.
- Margamkali is performed by the state's Syrian Christians, primarily by women during marriage ceremonies.
- Oppana, another Muslim dance, is usually a bridal group dance performed the day before the wedding and is particularly popular on the Malabar Coast. Young female relatives of the bride sing and dance around her, clapping their hands.
- Theyyam is a form of ritual dance worship. Theyyam is derived from the Malayalam Daivam (god), and the dance is part of ritual, music, painting, sculpture, and literature. It is performed to worship the goddess Kali, often by men from the scheduled castes and tribes who have inherited the right to perform it.
- Thirayattam, performed in northern Kerala, is part of theatre, music, satire, face and body painting, masking, martial art, and ritual. It is performed in South Malabar's kaavukal (sacred groves) and village shrines.
- Thitambu Nritham is primarily performed by the Nambudiris of northern Kerala.
- Ottan Thullal ("to jump about playfully") emerged during the 18th century and is a solo performance combining dance and recitation of tales from the Puranas in verse.
- Veera Natyam
- Thiruvathira Kali
- Thumbi thullal
- Kolkkali
- Padayani is a ritual theatre art form associated with Goddess temples in Kerala's Central Travancore region. The Padayani rituals are performed at night in the temple premises to appease Goddess Bhadrakali, whose fury has not abated since her victory over a mythical demon named Darikan. Each festival lasts seven to 28 days, depending on the number of villages participating and organizing it. In Malayalam, Padayani is composed of the words Pada and ani, which mean a group of soldiers and rows, respectively. It is believed that Padayani was performed by warriors trained in Kalaripayattu to frighten their enemies from the southern part of Travancore. As a result, this art form can be traced back to Kalaripayattu's rich martial art heritage.

== Lakshadweep ==
- Kolkali is a popular dance, rooted from Malabar coast and Kerala, also being practiced by people of Lakshadweep.
- Parichamuttukali (or Paricha Kali) is a popular martial-arts dance form of Kerala which is also practiced by people of Lakshadweep.
- Maliku Bandiya–a dance performed only by the people of Minicoy, is a variant of the Bandiya dance originally from the Maldives.

== Madhya Pradesh ==
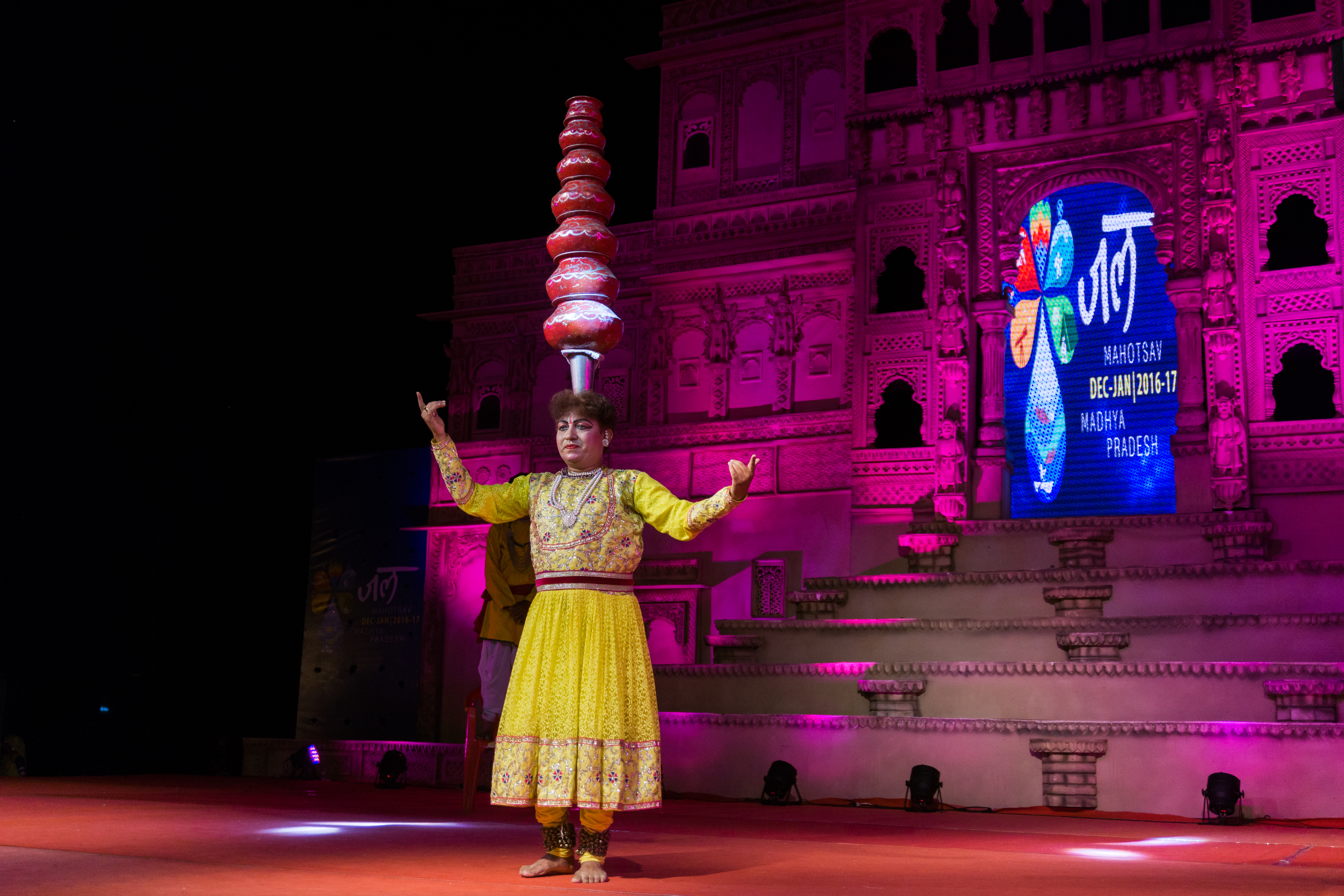
Matki dancer at Jal Mahotsav 2016

- Grida dance - Performed when the rabi crops are in bloom, the dance continues from morning to evening by village groups. It has three phases:
  - Sela – Slow, stiff foot movements
  - Selalarki – The foot movements become faster.
  - Selabhadoni – As the tempo accelerates, hands and legs move vigorously.
- The Matki dance is performed in the Malwa region, primarily for weddings. A veiled woman performs the dance with an earthen pot (matki) balanced on her head, sometimes joined by other women. Variations are the Aada and Khada Nach.
- The Phulpati dance is performed by semi-rural, unmarried women in celebration of nature.
- Tertali is a ritual dance performed by the Kamar tribe. It is generally performed by two or three veiled women who sit on the ground, sometimes with small swords clenched in their teeth and an ornamental pot on their heads. Manjira (small, metal cymbals) are tied to the body – primarily to the legs – and the dancers rhythmically strike them with a hand-held cymbal, accompanied by drums and singing.

== Maharashtra ==
- Pavri Nach (or Tarpha Nach) is a Kokna tribal dance performed in the hills of north-western Maharashtra, accompanied by the tarpha or pavri: a wind instrument made from a dried gourd.
- Lavani is a combination of traditional song and dance which is performed to the dholki drum. Noted for its powerful rhythm and eroticism, Lavani has contributed to the development of Marathi folk theatre.the famous songs are "Apsara Aali, "Wajle Ki Bara". In Maharashtra and southern Madhya Pradesh, it is performed by women wearing nine-yard-long saris. The songs are sung at a quick tempo.

== Nagaland ==
Chang Lo (also known as Sua Lua) is performed by the Chang Naga of Nagaland, originally to celebrate victory in war. It is presently a part of community celebrations, such as Poanglem, a three-day festival preceding the harvest. Costumes include the traditional Naga warrior and female finery.

== Odisha ==
=== Laudi Khela ===
Laudi Khela, traditionally performed by young Gopal men during the Dola festival, has been waning in popularity.

=== Bagha Nacha ===
Bagha Nacha, a tiger dance, is performed during festivals. Male dancers paint their skin with yellow and black stripes, like a tiger, and attach a tail.

=== Ghumra ===
Ghumra dance, originally performed during wars to encourage soldiers, is accompanied by a drum and is popular in Kalahandi district.

=== Karma dance ===
The Sambalpuri karma dance is performed during the harvest festival of Karma in the month of Bhadra.

=== Jhumar ===
Jhumar is performed in northern and western Odisha during festivals and the harvest season.

=== Keisabadi ===
Keisabadi, performed by men, is based on the story of Radha and Krishna and accompanied by singing in Sambalpuri.

== Puducherry ==
Garadi, a well-known dance in Puducherry, is performed at festivals. Its origin is a product of mythology; when Rama (hero of the epic Ramayana) defeated Ravana, the vanars (monkeys) danced to celebrate his victory. Garadi is usually performed for five to eight hours. Dancers wear vanar masks, carry sticks and wear ten chiming anjali (iron rings) as they dance, accompanied by singing and two large ramadolu drums.

== Punjab ==
=== Bhangra ===
Bhangra is one of Punjab's most popular dances, and has become part of Asian culture. Originally associated with Sikh farmers celebrating the harvest and accompanied by a dhol, bhangra is now danced at any celebration with a variety of instruments; a number of regional variations exist.

=== Giddha ===
Giddha, danced by women in colourful costumes, is derived from ring dancing and includes the singing of couplets (known as bolliyan) in Punjabi. Malwai Giddha is danced by men in Malwa.

=== Kikkli ===
Kikkli is performed by two colourfully dressed girls who hold crossed hands and twirl each other in a circle (balancing their positions), accompanied by folk songs.

== Rajasthan ==
=== Ghoomar ===
Ghoomar is a traditional women's dance in Rajasthan and Haryana. It is performed by groups of women in swirling skirts, accompanied by men and women singing. The dance gets its name from ghoomna, the spinning which displays the colourful, flowing ghaghara (the long Rajasthani skirt). ghoomer dance '

=== Kalbelia ===
The Kalbelia dance is performed by women in black, swirling skirts (as snakes), accompanied by male snake charmers playing beens and other instruments. The Kalbelia folk songs and dances were added to UNESCO's Representative List of the Intangible Cultural Heritage of Humanity in 2010.

=== Kachchhi Ghodi ===
The Kachchhi Ghodi dance is primarily performed in the Shekhawati region of north-eastern Rajasthan. The costumed horse and bandit dancers have mock fights while a singer narrates tales of local bandits. It is performed during weddings and other social occasions.

Chari

A dance from the Ajmer region of the state, involves dancing with pots of flaming cotton seeds on their heads.

Dandiya Raas

Dandiya Raas is an energetic, vibrant dance which originated in Rajasthan and Gujarat. Often called the "stick dance" because it uses polished sticks (dandiya), it represents a mock fight between the goddess Durga and the demon king Mahishasura. It is nicknamed "the sword dance" because the dandiya represent Durga's swords and are struck together. The traditional Rajasthani version requires a male and female pairing and doesnt have separate circles for genders like certain regions of neighboring Gujarat.

== Sikkim ==
Maruni, also popular in Nepal, Darjeeling, Assam, Bhutan and Myanmar, is accompanied by musicians playing the Naumati Baja. There are so many other dances like Ghantu dance, chu fauat, sikmari, Denzongcnenha, Khukhuri naach, chutkeynaach.

== Tamil Nadu ==
=== Bommalattam ===
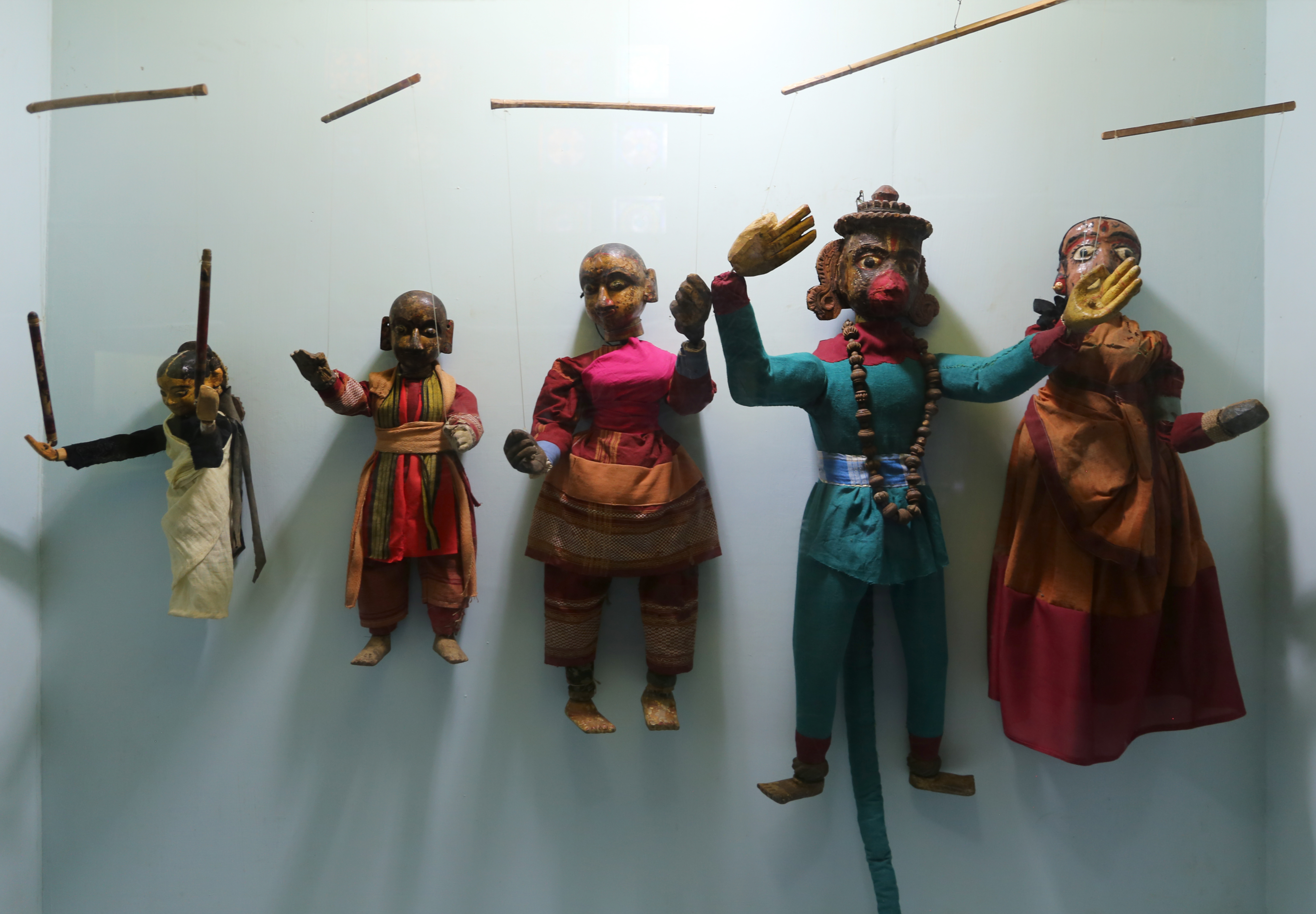
Doll marionettes used in Bommalattam

Bommalattam (puppet shows) is held in villages during festivals and fairs. Many kinds of puppets (such as cloth, wood, and leather), and they are manipulated with strings or wires. The puppeteers stand behind a screen, and the puppets are in front; the stories are from the puranas, epics, and folklore.

=== Kai silambattam ===
Silambu is a hollow anklet made up of a metal filled with beads that produce noise when the wearer moves or dances. In Kai silambattam, the dancers wear anklets and hold a silambu in their hands to make noises while dancing.

=== Karakattam ===
Karakattam is danced to praise Mariamman, the Hindu rain goddess. Dancers balance pots of water on their heads. There are two types of Karakattam. Aatta Karagam is danced with decorated pots on the dancers' heads and symbolises joy and happiness; Sakthi Karagam is danced in temples to praise Mariamman. Drums, singing and pipe instruments accompany the dancers.

=== Kavadiattam ===
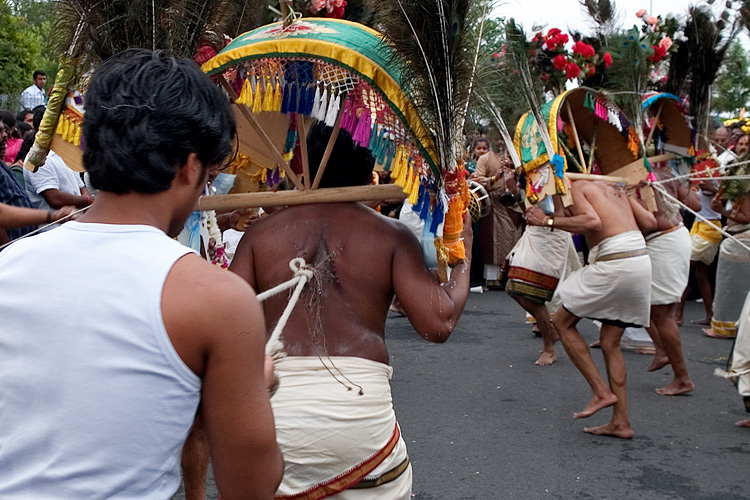
Kavadiattam

Kavadiattam is a often a ceremonial act of sacrifice and offering to Hindu gods especially Murugan. Kavadi (meaning "burden" in Tamil) consists of two semicircular pieces of wood or steel which are bent and attached to a cross structure that can be balanced on the shoulders of the carrier and decorated with flowers and peacock feathers. By bearing the kavadi, the dancer implores the gods for assistance as a means of balancing a spiritual debt.

=== Kummi ===
Kummi, one of Tamil Nadu's oldest folk dances, is accompanied by hand-clapping rather than musical instruments. Women form a circle and dance; one sings, with the other dancers taking turns. A number of varieties exist. Kummi is danced at festivals and other special occasions.

=== Mayilattam ===
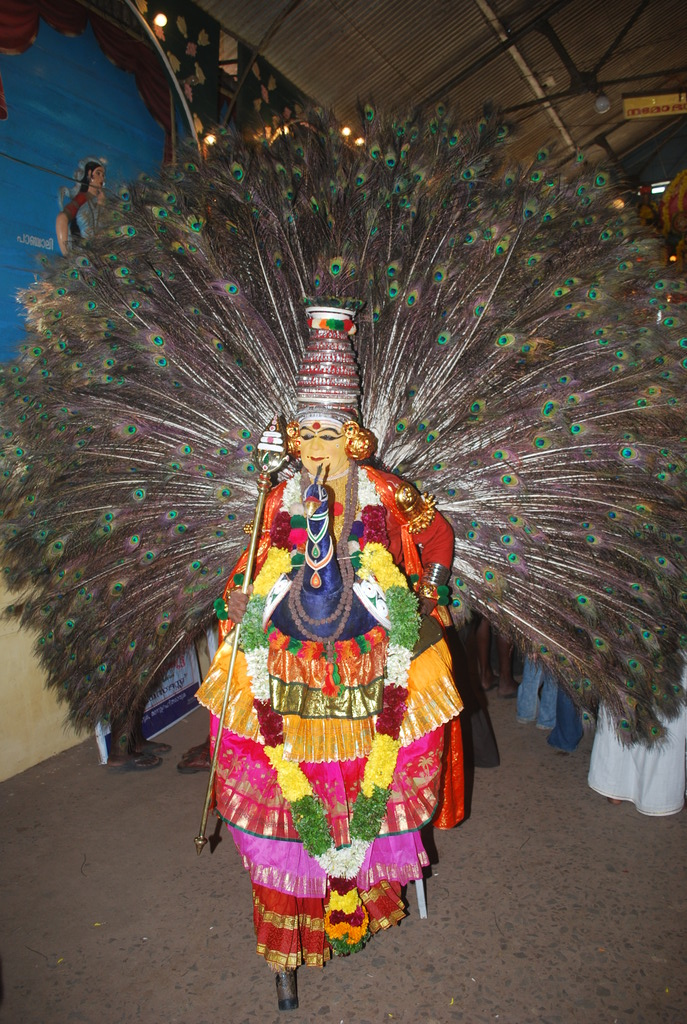
A Mayilattam performer

Mayilattam, or the peacock dance, is performed by girls dressed as peacocks at village festivals. Similar dances are Kaalai Attam (bull dance), Karadi Attam (bear dance), and Aali Aattam (demon dance) which are performed in the villages during village get-togethers. Vedala Aattam is danced in a demon mask.

=== Oyilattam ===
Although Oyilattam (dance of beauty) was traditionally performed by men, women have also begun dancing. Participants wearing ankle bells dance in a row, with musical accompaniment; the row lengthens as dancers join in. Oyilattam is most popular in the southern districts and the Kongu Nadu region, and the dance has a variety of styles. f>

=== Paambaatam ===
Snakes are viewed as protectors. The snake dance is performed by girls dressed in a costume designed like a snake-skin. The dancers move like a snake, making quick biting movements with their head and hands; raised hands, held together, resemble the head of a snake.

=== Paraiattam or Thappattam ===
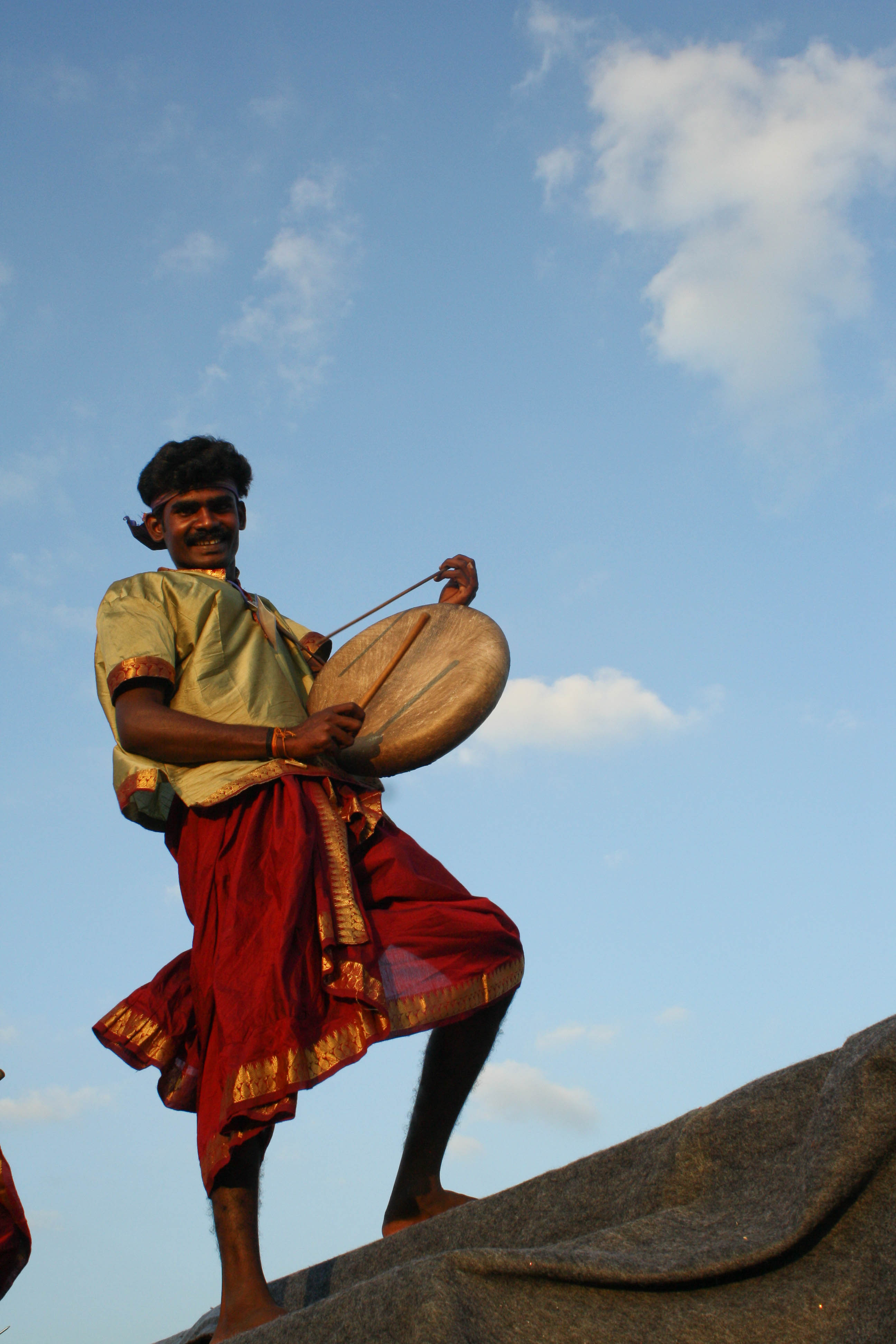
Traditional parai attam performer

Parai Attam is a Tamil dance which is accompanied by a parai drum.

=== Puliyattam ===
Puliyattam is a tiger dance in which young men paint their bodies and costume themselves as tigers, dancing to drums. The dancers sometimes pretend to capture a goat. A popular dance, Puliyattam is performed during temple festivals.

=== Poikal Kudirai Attam ===
Poikal attam is known as the false-leg dance. Dancers are attached to a dummy horse at the waist, with the dancer's two legs and their body prop resembling a rider on a horse. The dance illustrates stories from popular folklore.

=== Theru Koothu ===
Theru Koothu is normally performed by men in an intersection during village festivals in the months of Panguni and Aadi. The performance consists of story-telling, dialogues, songs, and dance. Its stories are taken from the puranas, epics such as the Ramayana and the Mahabharata, and local folklore. The play begins in the late evening, and lasts for several hours. Theru Koothu is popular in northern Tamil Nadu.

== Telangana ==
Perini Shivatandavam or Perini Thandavam is an ancient dance form which has been recently revived.

== Tripura ==
Hojagiri is danced by the Tripuri reang(Bru) clan in Tripura. Four to eight women dance acrobatically, while men provide most of the music; the women sing in chorus. The dancers twist and turn, sometimes dancing on an earthen pitcher or balancing a bottle on their heads with a lighted lamp on it.

Sangraing Dance is dance by the Mog community clan in Tripura. many boys and girls dance together and signging together.

== Uttar Pradesh ==
The Raslila, danced in North India (primarily Uttar Pradesh), is based on the life of Krishna. Individuals and groups dance, accompanied by singing, chants and instruments. The audience claps and sings along, and the length of each performance varies.

== West Bengal ==
- Gambhira originated among the Hindu community of Malda, West Bengal. After the partition of India, Chapai Nawabganj District in Rajshahi became its centre. Gambhira has undergone many changes in terms of the theme and style of its presentation. Muslims also became custodians of the dance, which became an integral part of their culture. Gambhira's themes include contemporary social problems and human weakness.
- Bengal, especially in Rajshahi, Murshidabad and Malda district and Jharkhand's Rajmahal hills. The song-and-dance performance is associated with the mid-April Gajan Shiva festival. The largely improvised performances, presented on an open stage late at night under lantern light, feature ribald humour and audience participation. Each Alkap group consists of ten to twelve performers led by a sorkar (master). It includes two or three young male chhokras, one or two gayen (singers).
- Domni, performed in Malda district, begins with prayers. Its dances are known as nachari or lachari. The plays are extracts from small events of everyday life, presented satirically. Due to social changes, domni is waning in popularity.
- Dhunuchi nritya is danced during the Durga Puja at Vijayadashami. Women and men wear traditional Bengali dress and dance with a mud pot filled with burnt coconut shavings in praise of Durga.

== State wise summary ==
State	Folk dances	Classical dance
Andhra Pradesh	Ghantamardala, Ottam Thedal, Mohiniattam, Kummi, Siddhi, Madhuri, Chhadi. Vilasini Natyam, Bhamakalpam, Veeranatyam, Dappu, Tappeta Gullu, Lambadi, Dhimsa, Kolattam, Butta Bommalu	Kuchipudi
Arunachal Pradesh	Chham, Mukhauta Nritya, Buiya, Chalo, Wancho, Pasi Kongki, Ponung, Popir, Bardo, Chong, Khaiva, Lim, Nuralim	
Assam	Bihu, Bichhua, Natpuja, Maharas, Kaligopal, Bagurumba, Naga dance, Khel Gopal, Tabal Chongli, Canoe, Jhumura Hobjanai	Sattriya
Bihar	Jata-Jatin, Bakho-Bakhain, Panwariya, Sama-Chakwa, Bidesia, Jatra .	
Chhattisgarh	Gaur Maria, Panthi, Raut Nacha, Pandwani, Vedamati, Kapalik, Chandaini, Bharthari Charit, Goudi, Karma, Jhumar, Dagla, Pali, Tapali, Navrani, Diwari, Mundari, Jhumar	
Goa	Fugdi, Dhalo, Kunbi, Dhangar, Mandi, Jhagor, Khol, Dakni, Tarangamel, Shigmo, Ghode, Modni, Samayi nrutya, Jagar, Ranmale, Amayi Nrutya, Tonnya Mell	
Gujarat	Garba, Dandiya Ras, Bhavai, Tippani Juriun, Bhavai.	
Haryana	Jhumar, Phag Dance, Daph, Dhamal, Loor, Gugga, Khor, Gagor	
Himachal Pradesh	Kinnauri, Thoda, Jhora, Jhali, Chharhi, Dhaman, Chhapeli, Mahasu, Dangi, Chamba, Thali, Jhainta, Daf	
Jharkhand	Karma, Agni, Jhumar, Janani Jhumar, Mardana Jhumar, Paika, Phagua, Chhanu, Sarahul, Jat-Jatin, Karma, Danga, Bidesia, Sohrai, Hunta Dance, Mundari Dance, Sarhul, Barao, Jhitka, Danga, Domkach, Ghora Naach	Chhau
Karnataka	Yakshagana, Huttari, Suggi, Kunitha, Karga, Lambi	
Kerala	Ottam Thulal, Kaikottikali, Tappatikali, Kali Aattam	Kathakali, Mohiniyattam
Madhya Pradesh	Tertali, Maanch, Matki, Gaur Maria, Ahirai, Bhadam, Aada, Khada Nach, Phulpati, Grida Dance, Selalarki, Selabhadoni, Jawara	
Maharashtra	Lavani, Nakata, Koli, Lezim, Gafa, Dahikala Dasavtar or Bohada, Tamasha, Mauni, Powara, Gouricha	
Manipur	Thang Ta, Lai Haraoba, Pung Cholom, Rakhal, Nat Rash, Maha Rash, Raukhat, Dol Cholam, Khamba Thaibi, Nupa Dance, Raslila, Khubak Ishei, Lhou Sha.	Manipuri
Meghalaya	Laho, Baala, Ka Shad Suk Mynsiem, Nongkrem,	
Mizoram	Cheraw Dance, Khuallam, Chailam, Sawlakin, Chawnglaizawn, Zangtalam, Par Lam, Sarlamkai/ Solakia, Tlanglam, Khanatm, Pakhupila, Cherokan	
Nagaland	Bamboo Dance, Temangnetin, Hetaleulee.Rangma, Zeliang, Nsuirolians, Gethinglim	
Odisha	Ghumara, Ranappa, Savari, Ghumara, Painka, Munari, Chhau, Chadya Dandanata, Savari, Painka, Munari	Odissi, Chhau
Punjab	Bhangra, Giddha, Daff, Dhaman, Bhand, Naqual	
Rajasthan	Ghoomar, Chari, Kalbeliya, Chakri, Ganagor, Jhulan Leela, Dandiya, Ghapal, Panihari, Ginad,	
Sikkim	Chu Faat, Yak Chaam Sikmari, Singhi Chaam or the Snow Lion, Yak Chaam, Denzong Gnenha, Tashi Yangku, Khukuri Naach, Chutkey Naach, Maruni Dance	
Tamil Nadu	Karagam, Kummi, Kolattam, Kavadi, Koothu, Paraiattam, Pampaattam, Oyilaattam, Mayilaattam, Puravaiattam, Kai silambattam	Bharatnatyam
Telangana	Perini Shivatandavam, Keisabadi	
Tripura	Hojagiri	
Uttar Pradesh	Nautanki, Raslila, Kajri, Jhora, Chappeli, Jaita	Kathak
Uttarakhand	Chappeli, Gadhwali, Kumayuni, Kajari, Jhora, Raslila	
West Bengal	Purulia Chhau, Alkap, Kathi, Gambhira, Dhali, Jatra, Baul, Marasia, Mahal, Keertan, Santhali Dance, Mundari dance, Gambhira, Gajan, Chaibari Nritya	Chhau

== See also ==
- Dance in India
- Folk dances of Sourashtra
- List of Indian classical dance and music events
- Indian classical dance
