= List of Indian dances =

Some classical Indian dances include: Bharathanatyam, Kathak, Kathakali, Kuchipudi, Manipuri, Mohiniattam, Odissi, and Satthiya. We will dive deeper into more specific styles of Indian dance and where they originated from below.

This is the list of traditional Indian dances.

== A ==
- Andhra natyam (Art dance of Andhra Pradesh and Telangana, South India)

== B ==
- Bagurumba (folk dance of Assam, North East India)
- Bhortal (folk dance of Assam, North East India)
- Bhangra (Folk Dance of Punjab, North India)
- Bharatnatyam (Tamil Nadu, South India)
- Bihu dance (Folk dance of Assam, East India)
- Bathukamma (Folk dance of Telangana, South India)
- Vaikuntha (Folk Dance of India, Asia)

== C ==
- Chhau (Odisha, West Bengal, East India)
- Chholiya (Uttarakhand)
- Chu-faat (Sikkim)

== D ==
- Dollu Kunitha (Folk Dance Of Karnataka, India)
- Dandiya (Folk dance of Gujarat, West India)
- Deodhani (Folk dance of Assam, North East India)
- Dhangari (Folk dance of Maharashtra, West India)
- Dhemsa (Tribal dance of Koraput, Odisha)
- Domkach (Folk dance of Bihar and Jharkhand)
- Dekhni (attractive mixture of folk culture and western music came into existence during Portuguese ruling goa)

== F ==
- Firkal (Folk dance of Jharkhand and Odisha)

== G ==
- Garba (Folk dance of Gujarat, West India)
- Giddha (folk dance of Punjab North India)
- Ghoomar (folk dance of Rajasthan West India)
- Gaudiya Nritya (Classical dance of West Bengal)
- Geraiya Nritya (folk tribe dance of Gujarat, India
- Ghumura (Odisha)

== J ==
- Jhumair (folk dance of Jharkhand, Chhattisgarh, Odisha, West Bengal, Assam (jhumur))

== K ==
- Kamsale (folk dance of Karnataka )
- Kathak (Uttar Pradesh, Classical Indian Dance)
- Kathakali (Kerala, India, Incorporates dance)
- Kerala Natanam (Indian Dance created by Guru Gopinath)
- Krishnanattam
- Kuchipudi (Classical Indian Dance, Andhra Pradesh)
- Kolattam (folk Tamil Nadu)
- Koli Dance (Folk Maharashtra)
- Karakattam (folk Tamil Nadu)
- Kanyarkali (Folk Dance, Kerala
- Kalbelia (Folk Dance, Rajasthan)

== L ==
- Lavani (Folk Dance, Maharashtra)
- Lambadi (Folk Dance, Telangana and Andhra Pradesh)

== M ==
- Mohiniattam (Indian classical dance from Kerala)
- Manipuri (Indian classical dance from Manipur)
- Matki Dance – Madhya Pradesh
- Mardana Jhumar - Jharkhand
- Margamkalli- dance form performed by the St. Thomas Christians community of Kerala

== N ==
- Nandi Dwaja ನಂದಿ ಧ್ವಜ (folk dance of Karnataka ಕರ್ನಾಟಕ)
- Nati dance (Folk dance of Himachal Pradesh, India.
- Nautanki (dance form of Uttar Pradesh)

== O ==
- Odissi aka Orissi (Odisha, East India) (Indian classical dance from Odisha)
- Ojapali (folk dance of Assam, North East India)
- oyilattam aka oyilattam (Madurai, Tamil Nadu)
- Oppana (Kerala)

== P ==
- Patta ಪಟ್ಟ (folk dance of Karnataka ಕರ್ನಾಟಕ)
- Panthi (folk dance of Chhattisgarh, India)
- Parai Attam (Tamil Nadu)
- Puliyattam (folk dance of Tamil Nadu, India)
- Perini shiva thandavam (dance form of Telangana) Perini Sivatandavam
- Pulikali – Kerala
- Popir - Arunachal Pradesh

== R ==
- Raut Nacha (Folk dance of Chhattisgarh, India)
- Raas lila (Indian Classical Dance)
- Rathwa dance (Folk dance of Chhota Udaipur India)

== S ==
- Soma Kunita ಸೋಮ ಕುಣಿತ (Folk Dance of Karnataka)
- Sambalpuri (dance from Odisha)(semi-classical dance of India)
- Sattriya (Dance form of Assam)

== T ==
- Thirayattam (Ethnic Dance of Kerala)
- Tamasa (Folk dance, Maharashtra)
- Tera Taali (Rajasthan)
- Thiruvathira (Kerala)
- Theyyam (Kerala)

== V ==
- Veeragaase ವೀರಗಾಸೆ (folk dance of Karnataka, South India)
- Vilasini Natyam (art dance of Andhra Pradesh, South India)

== Y ==
- Yakshagana ಯಕ್ಷಗಾನ (Karavali Region of Karnataka)

== See also ==
- List of Indian classical dance and music events
- Indian classical dance
- List of Indian folk dances
- Folk dance in India
- List of ethnic, regional, and folk dances by origin
