= Folk dance forms of Odisha =

Several folk dance forms evolved in different regions of Odisha, Odissi and Chhau being some popular forms. Sambalpuri dance is most popular dance of western Odisha and is enjoyed by many.

== Laudi Khela ==
Laudi Khela, also known as Gauda Nacha, is a form of dance practiced in some coastal districts of Odisha, including Cuttack, Jajapur, Jagatsinghpur, Puri, Khurda, Bhadrak, Baleswar, Dhenkanal, and Angul. Traditionally, the performers are young boys of the 'Gauda' or 'Gopal' castes. This dance is performed during Dola Purnima (Holi). The dance is dedicated to Krishna and his consort Radha. The dancers wear clothes associated with Krishna, ghagudi (small bells as girdles), and peacock feathers. Each dancer carries two sticks, striking each other's sticks in a rhythmical manner. Singha (buffalo's horn) and flute usually accompany the dance.

== Other folk dances ==
Ghumura Dance (or Ghumra Dance) is one of the most sought and leading folk dance form in Odisha. It is classified as folk dance as the dress code of Ghumura resembles more like a tribal dance, but recent researchers argue different mudra and dance form present in Ghumura bear more resemblance with other classical dance form of India. The timeline of Ghumura dance is not clear. Many researchers claim it was a War dance in ancient India and used by Ravana in Ramayana. Ghumura dance is depicted in Sun Temple of Konark confirming this dance form is from the medieval period. In the 'Madhya Parba" of "Sarala Mahabharata" Ghumura has been mentioned as:

Dhola Madala Gadi je Ghumura Bajai
Ghumura je Ghumu Ghumu Hoi Garajai

In Chandi Purana mentions:

Biratwara Biradhola Daundi Ghumura
Kadamardala Bajanti Mari Galatura

Ghumura was also used as a Darbari dance in the princely state of Kalahandi and played by the erstwhile Kalahandi state during war times. The typical mixed sound that comes out of the musical instruments like Ghumura, Nishan, Dhol, Taal, Madal etc. and the expressions and movements of the artists make this dance to be a "Heroic Dance". Since thousands of years Ghumura dance has evolved from a war dance to a dance form for cultural and social activities. The dance is associated with social entertainment, relaxation, love, devotion and friendly brotherhood among all class, creed and religion in the present days. Traditionally this dance is also associated with Nuakhai and Dasahara celebration in Kalahandi and large parts of South Western Odisha. Ghumura dance is still hidden in the village level in South Western Orissa and some parts of bordering Andhra Pradesh and Chhattisgarh. Kalahandi region has taken a leading rule in popularizing and retaining its unique identity of Ghumura dance. Kalahandi is mainly known as land of Ghumura. Ghumura dance has got the opportunity to represent the nation in various international events in Delhi, Moscow, Kolkata, and various other cities in India. Ghumura dance is also one of the most researched folk dance form in Orissa.

Ruk Mar Nacha (& Chhau dance) is originated and performed in the Mayurbhanj District of Odisha and also in Nilagiri of Baleswar district. It has its base in the martial arts tradition. The dance is a stylized mock battle in which two groups of dancers armed with swords and shields, alternatively attack and defend themselves with vigorous movements and elegant stances. Especially notable is the accompanying music, noted for its rhythmic complexities and vigorous percussion. The instruments include 'Mahuri' – a double reeded instrument, 'Dhola' – a barrel shaped two-sided drum, 'Dhumsa' – a hemispherical drum and 'Chadchadi' – a short cylindrical drum.

Goti Pua:

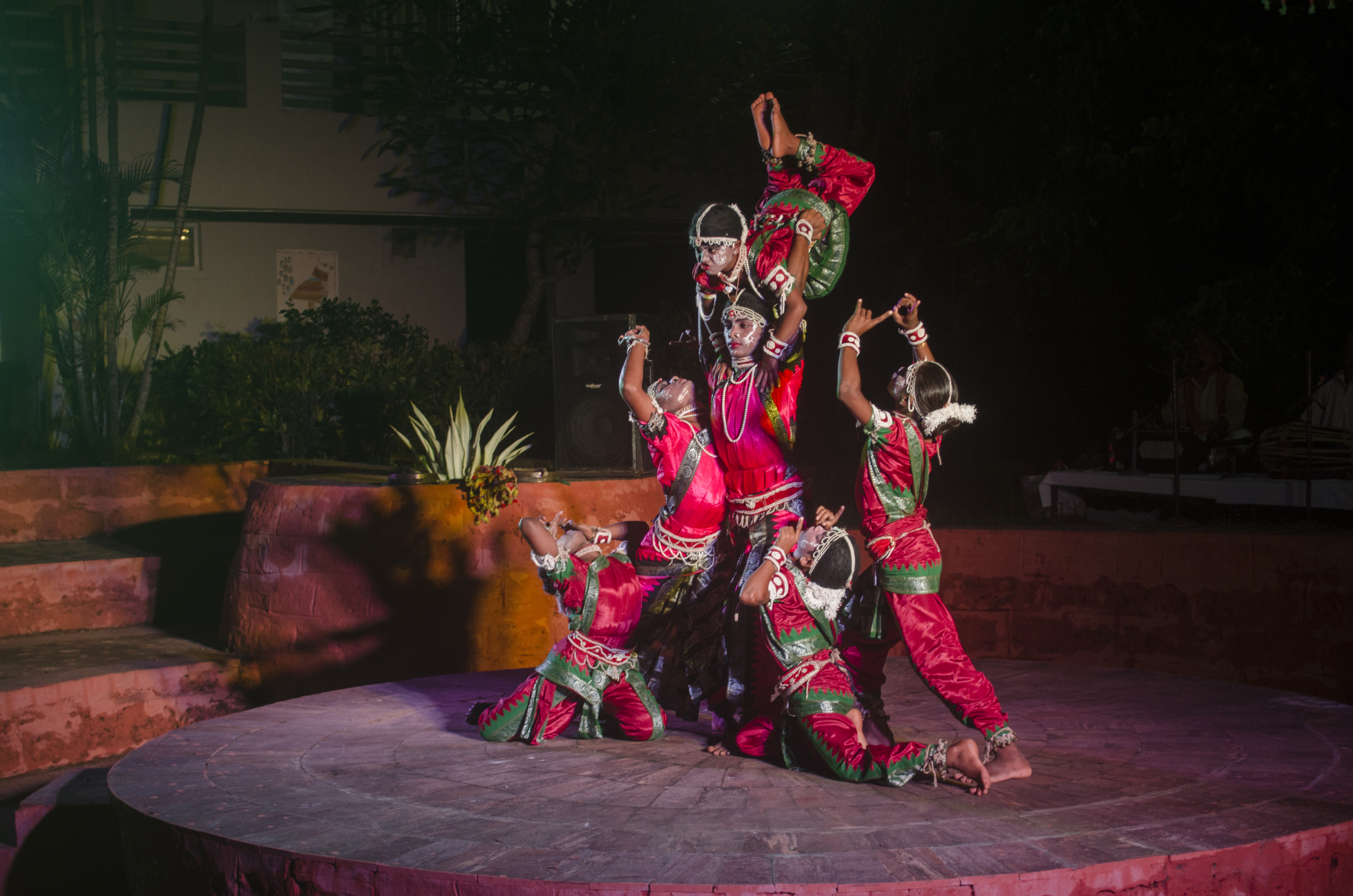
Gotipua Dancers perform at Sterling Resort Puri, Odisha

The goti puas are boy dancers who dress up as girls. They are students of the akhadas, or gymnasia, established by Ramachandra Deva I in Puri, in the periphery of the temple. As they were offshoots of the akhada system, goti puas also came to be known as akhada pilas – boys attached to akhadas. Another reason often given to justify the emergence of the goti pua system is that some followers of the Vaishnava religion disapproved of dancing by women as a pretext for worship – they introduced the practice of dancing by boys dressed as girls. The word goti means 'one', 'single' and pua, 'boy', but the goti puas always dance in pairs. Boys are recruited about the age of six and continue to perform till they are 14, then become teachers of the dance or join drama parties. Goti puas are now part of professional teams, known as dals, each headed by a guru. The boys are trained for about two years, during which, after having imbibed the basic technique, they learn items of dance, ornamental and expressional. The goti puas, being youngsters in their formative years, can adapt their bodies to the dance in a far more flexible manner as opposed to the maharis. A goti pua presentation is ably supported by a set of three musicians, who play the pakhawaj, the gini or cymbals and the harmonium. The boys do the singing themselves, though at times the group has an additional singer.

Baagha Naacha or Tiger dance Sambalpuri folk dance is performed in Binka and Sonepur of Subarnapur district during the month of chaitra. The dancer (only men) paints his bare body with yellow and black stripes like that of a tiger and attaches a suitable tail. One or more dancers move from house to house and after a crowd gathers the dance begins. The dancers are accompanied by a drummer and a bell player who provides the music. The dance is nothing but acrobatic movement in rhythm. They make hissing sounds while dancing. Tiger dance is also performed in Berhampur during the Thakurani Jatra.

Dalkhai: Mainly dalkhai is named after a goddess "dalkhai Devi". Though Dusserah is the occasion of Sambalpuri folk dance Dalkhai, it's the most popular folk-dance of Odisha, its performance is very common on all other festivals such as Bhaijiuntia, Phagun Puni, Nuakhai, etc. This is mostly danced by young women of Binjhal, Kuda, Mirdha, Sama and some other tribes of Sambalpur, Balangir, Sundargarh, Bargarh and Nuapada districts. During this dance men join them as drummers and musicians. The dance is accompanied by a rich orchestra of folk music played by a number of instruments known as Dhol, Nisan, Tamki, Tasa and Mahuri. However, the Dhol player controls the tempo while dancing in front of the girls. It is known as Dalkhai because in the beginning and end of every stanza the word is used as an address to a girl friend. The love story of Radha and Krishna, the episodes from Ramayana and Mahabharata, the description of natural scenery are represented through the songs. The song associated with this dance is sung in the Sambalpuri Odia. The young women dance and sing intermittently. The songs are of special variety with the additive 'Dalkhai Go' which is an address to a girlfriend. While dancing to the uncanny rhythms of the Dhol, they place the legs close together and bend the knees. In another movement they move forward and backward in a half-sitting position. Sometimes they make concentric circles clockwise and anti-clockwise. The women generally dress themselves in colourful Sambalpuri Saris and wear a scarf on the shoulders holding the ends below in both the hands. Bedecked with traditional jewellery, their robust frames sustain the strains of the dance for long hours. The Dalkhai dance has several adjunctive forms for all ages and groups :

Dances performed by female children: Chhiollai, Humobauli and Dauligit.

Dances Performed by teenagers: Sajani, Chhata, Daika and Bhekani.

Dances Performed by Youths: Rasarkeli, Jaiphul, Maila Jada, Bayamana, Gunchikuta .

The man who worship work, composes "Karma" and "Jhumer" invigorating Lord Vishwakarma and the Karamashani goddess.

Dhap dance: This Sambalpuri folk dance is mostly performed by the Kandha tribe of Western Odisha. Both men and women participate in the dance. Men of one village dance with women of another village. Usually unmarried boys and girls take part. The dance is performed during marriage ceremony and more often for the sake of recreation. The dance is named so because of the accompanying instrument called ‘Dhap.’ The dhap is in the shape of a Khanjari made up of wood with one side open and the other side covered with a piece of animal skin. The dhap dancer holds the dhap with his left hand, the sling slung over his left shoulder, and beats with his right as well as left hand.

Karma Naach: Karam or Karma literally means 'fate' in Sambalpuri. This pastoral Sambalpuri folk dance is performed during the worship of the god or goddess of fate (Karam Devta or Karamsani Devi), whom the people consider the cause of good and bad fortune. It begins from Bhadra Shukla Ekadasi (eleventh day of the brightmoon of the month of Bhadra) and lasts for several days. This is popular among the scheduled class tribes (e.g. the Binjhal, Kharia, Kisan and Kol tribes) in the districts of Balangir, Kalahandi, Sundargarh, Sambalpur and Mayurbhanj. This dance is in honour of Karamsani, the deity who bestows children and good crops. After the puja is done it is followed by singing and dancing in accompaniment of drum (maandal), cymbal etc. The dance performance full of vigour and energy combined with charm of the youth decked with colourful costumes in exuberance of red cloth, set in peacock feathers, skillfully designed ornaments made of small conch shells, brings the onlookers as well as the performers to a mood of trance and ecstasy. In this dance both men and women take part and continue to engross themselves for the whole night. The skillful movement of the young boys with mirror in hand indicates the traditional pattern of love-making in course of dancing and singing. The dance is performed sometimes by boys in group, sometimes by girls in group and sometimes both the sexes together. The subject matter of songs constitutes the description of nature, invocation to Karmasani, desires, aspiration of people, love and humour.

Jhumair: Jhumair is a folk dance of North Odhia and Western Odisha. It is performed during harvest season and Festivals.

Keisabadi: Only men can take part in this form of the Sambalpuri folk dance. Some of them holding a stick two feet in length. They dance in different forms by striking the sticks according to the rhythms of the song they sing. The leader sings first and others follow him. They sing and in every stanza they shout "Haido". The main theme of the song is derived from the love story of Radha and Krishna.

== See also ==
- List of Indian folk dances
