= Nacha =

Nacha may refer to:

- Atlach-Nacha, a novel by H. P. Lovecraft
- Nacha Guevara (born 1940), Argentine actress
- Nacha Pop, a Spanish pop/rock group
- Nacha Regules, 1950 Argentine film
- Raut Nacha, a dance performed by the Yadavas clan in India

== See also ==
- NACHA, a payment system organization
