= Kachchhi Ghodi dance =

Indian folk dance

Kachchhi Ghodi
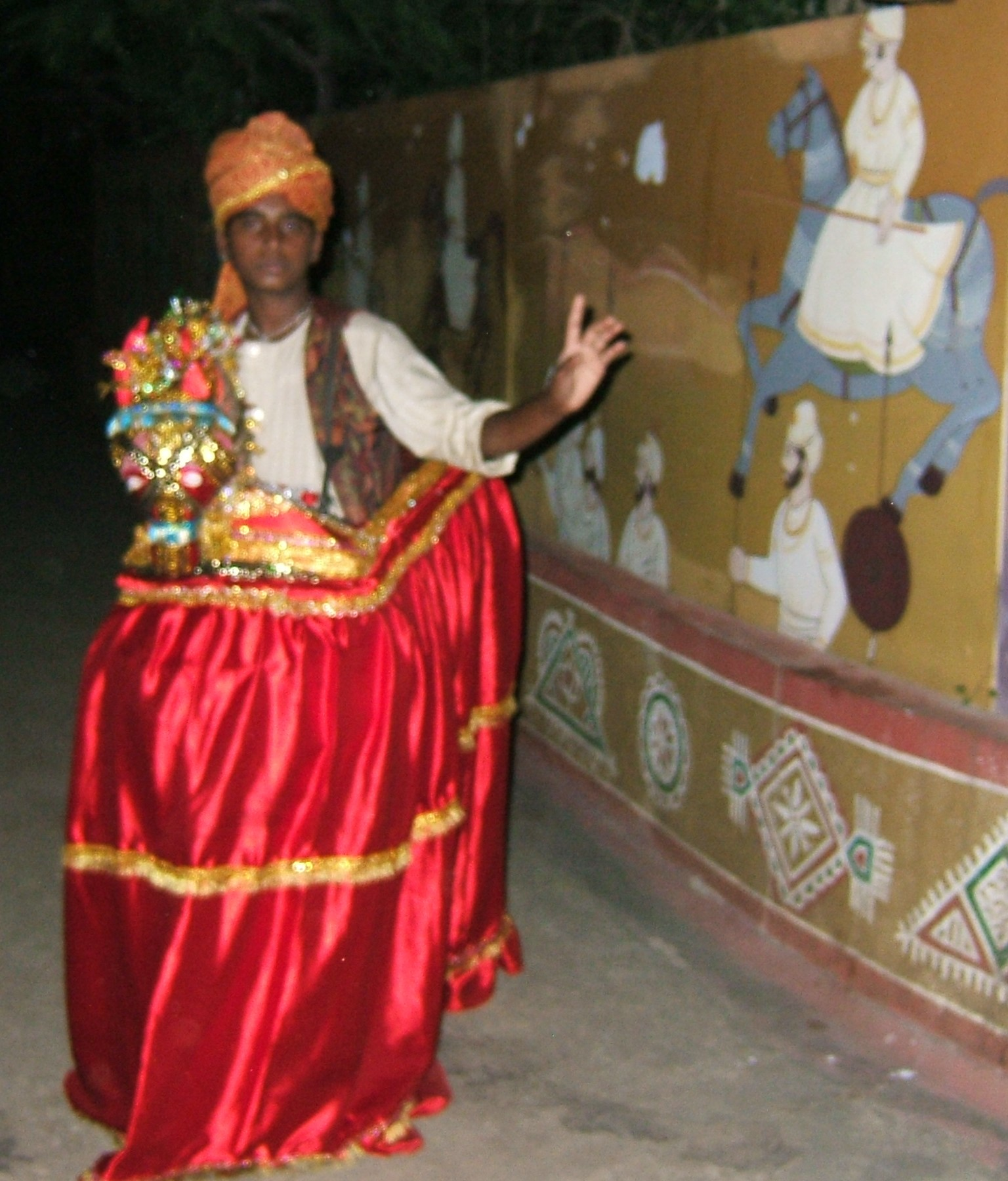
- A Kachhi Ghodi dancer in a hobby horse costume
- Genre: Folk dance
- Origin: Shekhawati, Rajasthan, India

Kachchhi Ghodi dance also spelled Kachhi Ghodi and Kachhi Gori, is an Indian folk dance that originated in the Shekhawati region of Rajasthan. It has since been adopted and performed throughout the rest of the country. Dancers wear novelty horse costumes, and participate in mock fights, while a singer narrates folk tales about local bandits. It is commonly performed during wedding ceremonies to welcome and entertain the bridegroom's party, and during other social settings. Performing the dance is also a profession for some individuals.

== Etymology ==
In Hindi, Kachchhi has many possible meanings, two of which are "diaper" and "of or belonging to the Kutch region", while Ghodi means mare. Together, Kachchhi Ghodi refers to the imitation horse costume worn around the waist of the dancer.

== Description ==
Kachchhi Ghodi includes a combined performance by dancers, singers and musicians. In Rajasthan, the dance is performed by men dressed in a kurta and a turban, along with an imitation horse costume. The shell of the costume is constructed out of papier-mâché molded to resemble a horse supported by a bamboo frame. It is then covered with bright colored fabric elaborately designed with mirror-work embroidery known as Shisha. The dummy horse does not have legs. Instead, fabric is draped around the dancer's waist covering the entire length of his legs. Around the ankles, the dancers wear musical bells known as ghungroo, similar to those worn by Indian classical dancers.

When performed as a group dance, people stand on opposite sides with swords in their hands and run back and forth quickly which, when viewed from above, resembles the opening and closing of flowers. The dancers move to the rhythm of flute music and the beats of dhol drums. Singers narrate the mock fights with stories of the exploits of Bhanwariya bandits, the Rajasthani equivalent of Robin Hood.

== Geography ==
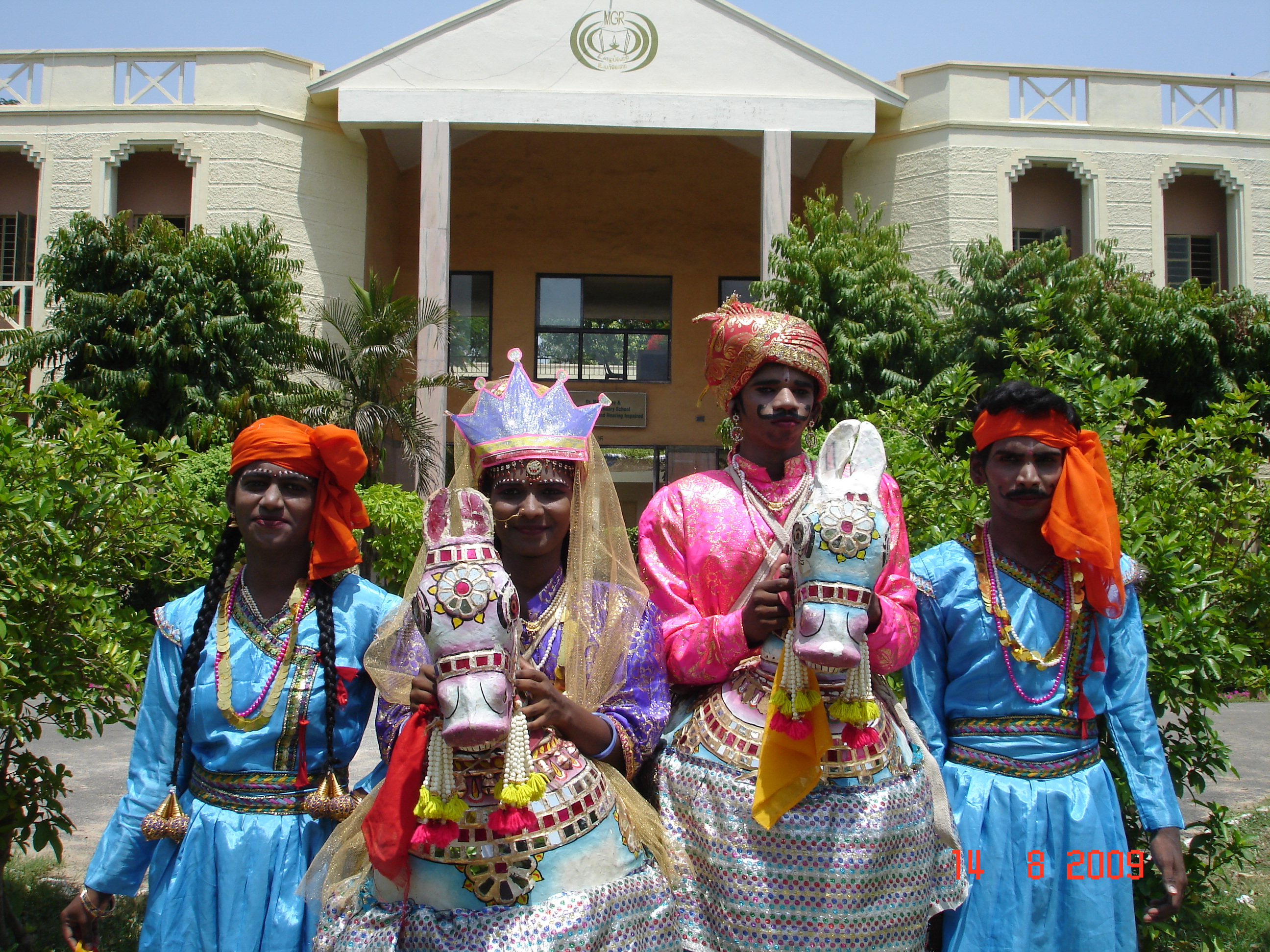
A group of Poikkal kuthirai aattam (false-leg horse dance) performers from Ramavaram, Tamil Nadu.

The dance originated in the Shekhawati region of Rajasthan. It is prevalent in the Kamdholi, Sarghara, Bhambi and Bhavi communities. It is also performed with the same name in other parts of India, including Maharashtra and Gujarat.

In the state of Tamil Nadu, Poikkal kuthirai aattam (Tamil: பொய்க்கால் குதிரை ஆட்டம், which stands for false-leg horse dance) is a folk dance similar to Kachchhi Ghodi. The differences lie in the props used. It is performed with wooden legs meant to resemble the sounds made by the hooves of a horse during the annual festivals of the Amman Temple in Thanjavur.

== See also ==
- Folk dance in India
- Culture of Rajasthan
