= Male Mahadeshwara Hills =

- Pilgrimage centre
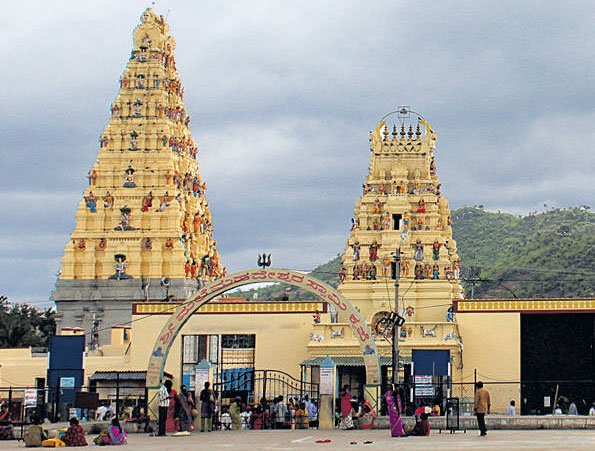
- Male Mahadeshwara Hills
- Interactive map of Male Mahadeshwara Hills
- Country: India
- State: Karnataka
- District: Chamarajanagara
- Taluka: Hanur
- Named for: Mahadeshwara

Government
  - Type: Muzarai
  - Body: Karnataka State Government
- Elevation: 910 m (2,990 ft)
- Highest elevation: 1,514 m (4,967 ft)

Languages
  - Official: Kannada
- Time zone: UTC+5:30 (IST)
- Postal code: 571490
- Nearest city: Hanur

Male Mahadeshwara Betta (Hill), is a pilgrim town located in the Hanur taluk of Chamarajanagar district of southern Karnataka in India. It is situated at about 150 km from Mysuru and about 210 km from Bengaluru. The temple of Male Mahadeshwara is a pilgrim centre dedicated to Male Mahadeshwara, who is considered to be incarnation of Shiva. The area is also called Male Mahadeshwara wildlife sanctuary. The temple draws lakhs of pilgrims from the states of Karnataka and parts of Tamil Nadu and Kerala.

The area of the temple surroundings is 155.57 acres (0.6296 km^{2}). In addition, the temple has lands at Talabetta, Haleyuru and Indiganatha villages. Amidst dense forest, the temple attracts not only the pilgrims but also nature lovers. The height of the hill is about 3000 feet above sea level.

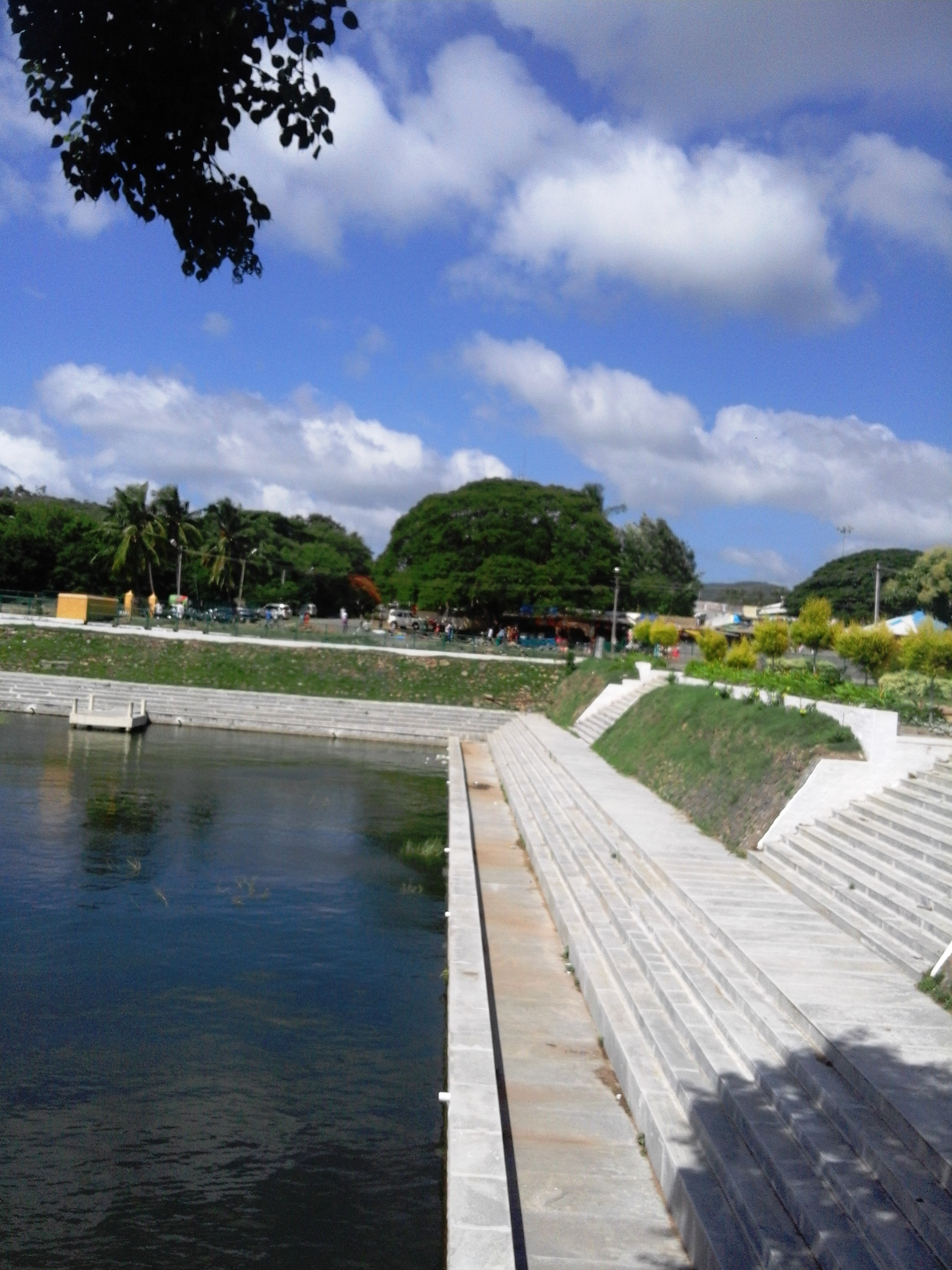
The temple tank

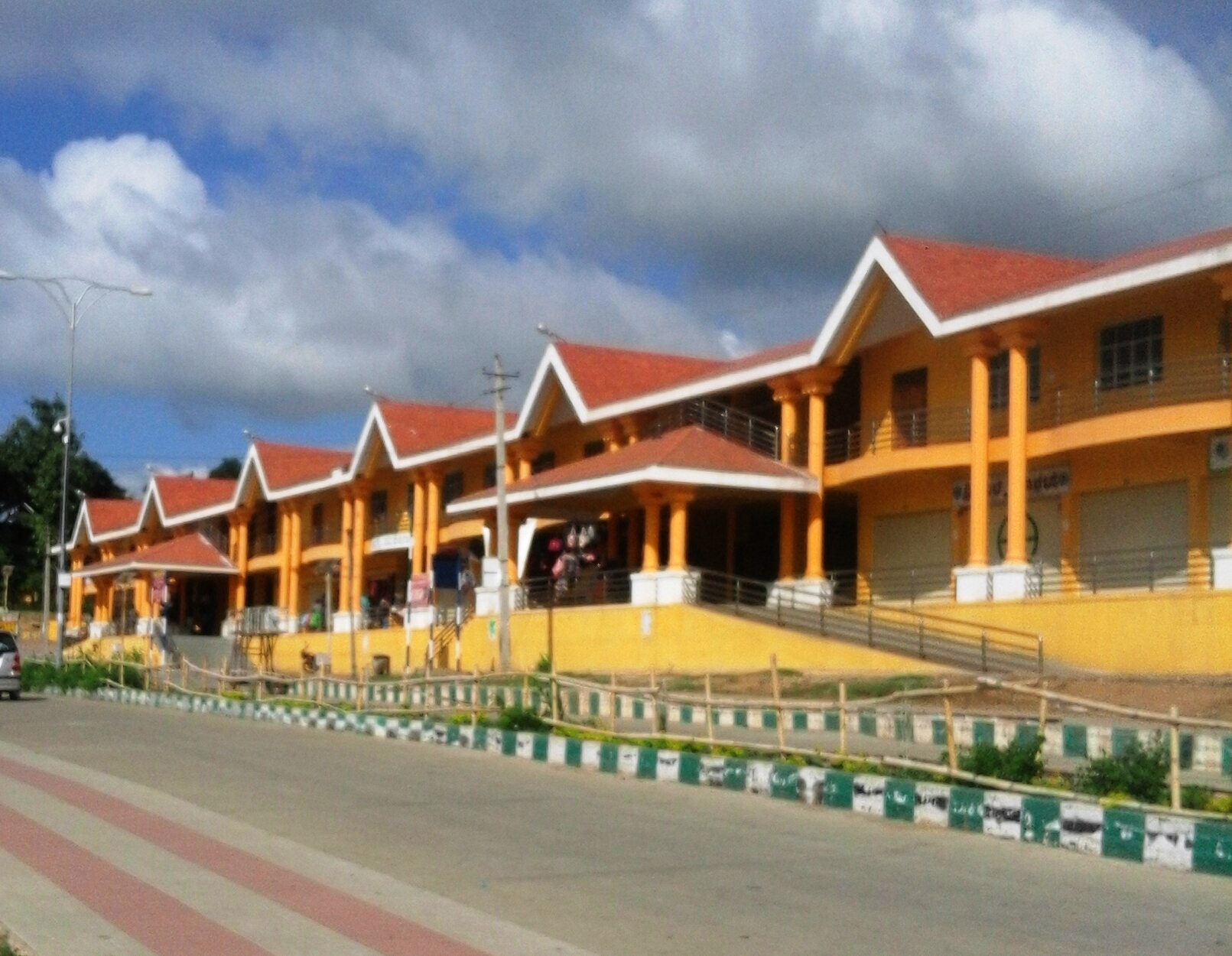
The bus station

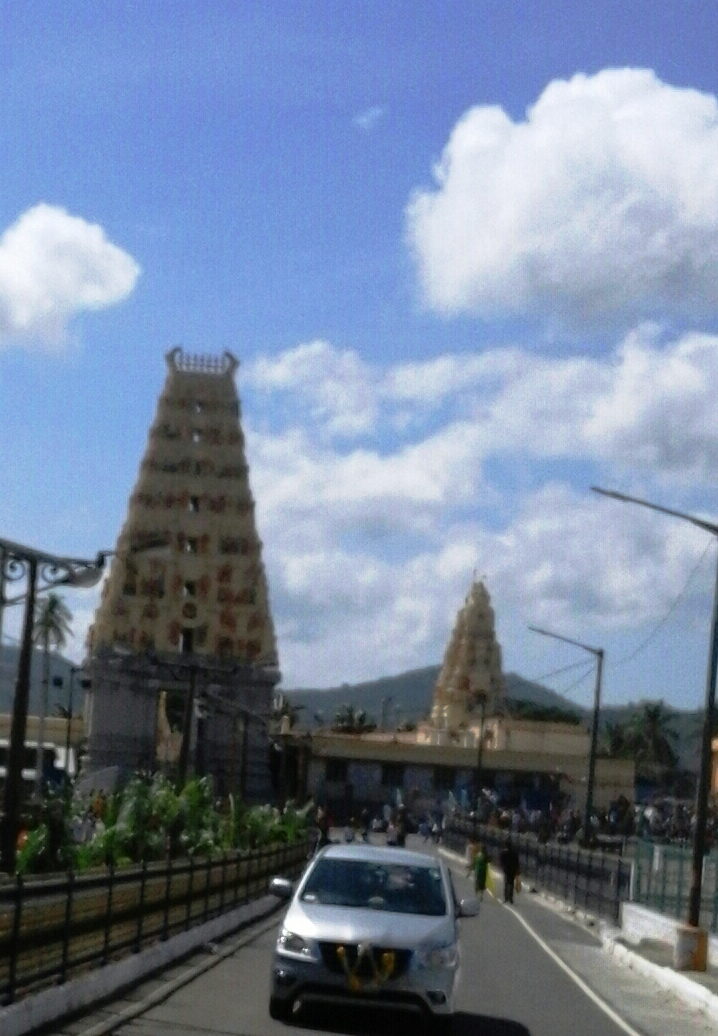
The temple complex

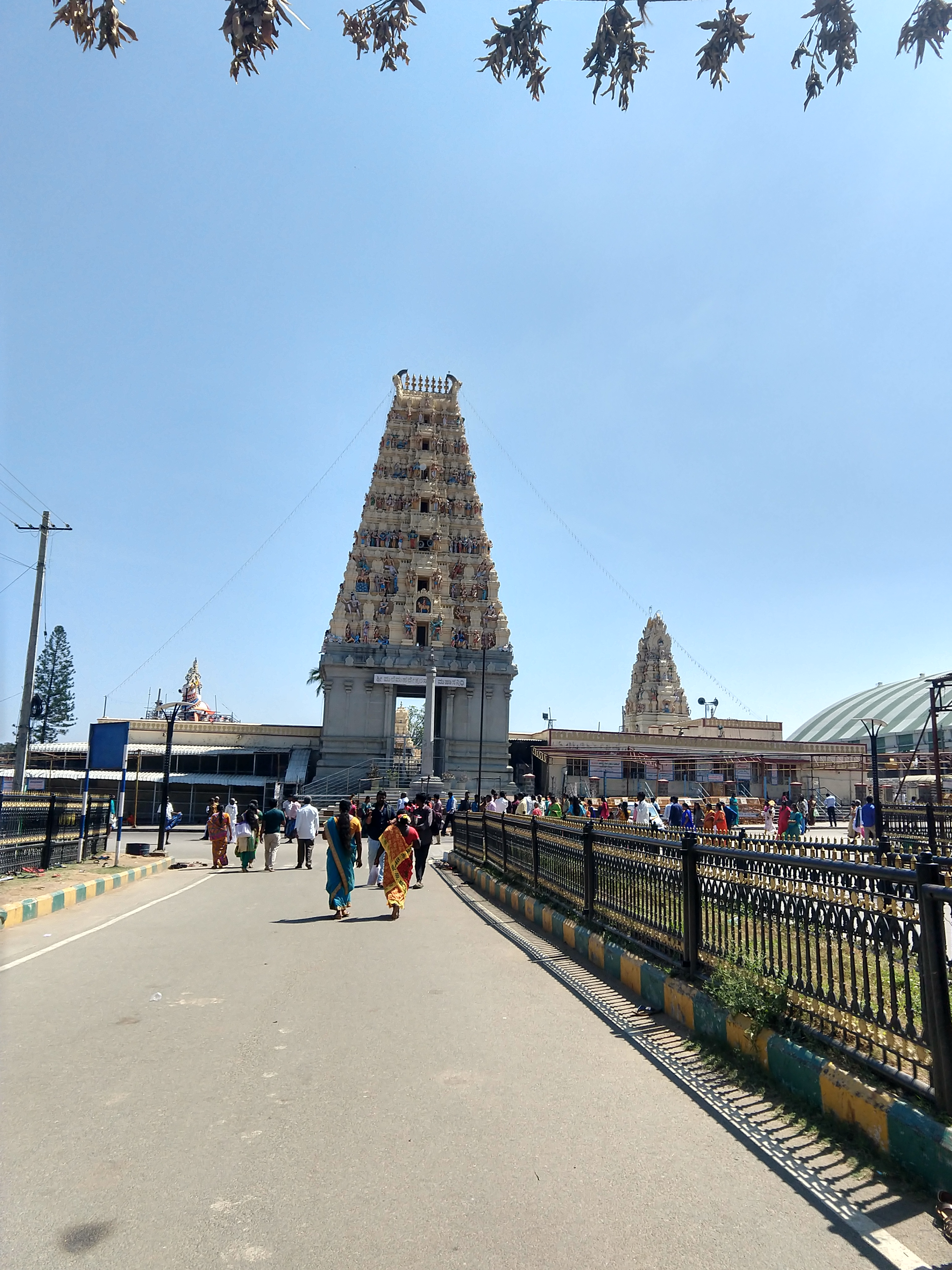
Mahadeshwara Temple entrance and Nandhi

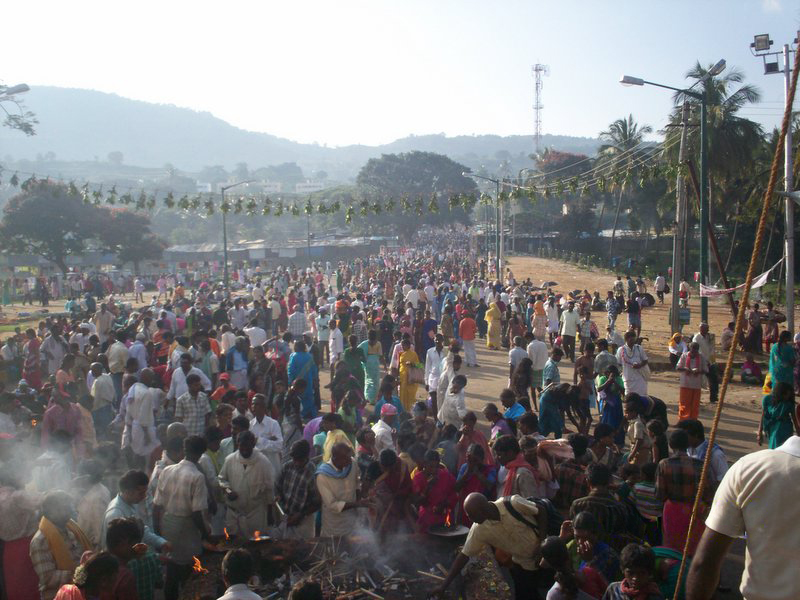
Devoutees at M.M.Hills

Junje Gowda is the legendary builder of the Male Mahadeshwara temple in hanur taluk of Chamarajanagara District. He was a local landlord belonging to the Kuruba community and a devotee of Shri Mahadeshwara Swamy. The Lord Sri Mahadeshwara is believed to be the incarnation of Lord Shiva. Historical evidences suggest that the Saint Mahadeshwara must have lived during the 15th century. About 600 years ago, he came here to perform penance and it is believed that he is still performing penance in the temple's Garbha Gudi in the form of a Linga. The Linga, worshipped now in the Garbha Gudi, is a self-manifested (swayambhu) one. Male Mahadeshwara was said to travel on a tiger known as Huli Vāhana (Tiger as a vehicle) and perform a number of miracles around the Betta to save the people and saints living there, which are sometimes sung by the village folk in Janapada Style.

== Legend ==
According to the legend, Male Mahadeshwara rode on a tiger and performed miracles, including curing diseased cattle. The Lingayats considered him to be from their community. He is said to have been the third abbot of the Haradanahalli Matha. The temple was built by a Kuruba landlord in the 15th century.

== Geography ==
Male Mahadeshwara Hills are located at the northeastern section of a disjoint projection of the Western Ghats in a northeastern direction at the southern edge of the Deccan Plateau. Together with the Biligiriranga Hills, the hill range forms a geological bridge between the Eastern Ghats and the Western Ghats. The region is separated from the Nilgiris by the Moyar River.

The Male Mahadeshwara Hills region is bound by the Kaveri river to the north and east, and by the Palar river, a tributary of Kaveri, to the south. The confluence of these two rivers is located at the southeast corner of the Male Mahadeshwara forest, with the Stanley Reservoir further downstream.

The average elevation of the Male Mahadeshwara Hills is around 3,000 feet (910 m). The highest point is Ponnachi Betta, rising 1,514 metres (4,967 ft) above sea level.

Map of the region

Prominent peaks of Male Mahadeshwara Hills
Name		Coordinates	Elevation	Nearest Village
Ponnachi Range	Ponnachi Betta	12°07′20″N 77°38′39″E	1,514 metres (4,967 ft)	Ponnachi
Ponnachi Range	Barai Hanai	12°08′46″N 77°38′42″E	1,493 metres (4,898 ft)	Ponnachi
Ponnachi Range	Santekan Boli	12°07′26″N 77°38′33″E	1,483 metres (4,865 ft)	Ponnachi
Ponnachi Range	Gandana Parai	12°06′25″N 77°37′59″E	1,243 metres (4,078 ft)	Ponnachi
Kambattakal Betta		12°01′48″N 77°32′29″E	1,430 metres (4,690 ft)	Kokkubarai
Ediru Boli		12°01′18″N 77°34′12″E	1,359 metres (4,459 ft)	Male Mahadeshwara Hills
Sankana Malai		11°58′18″N 77°33′59″E	1,313 metres (4,308 ft)	Doddane
Budubarai Betta		11°58′55″N 77°31′48″E	1,238 metres (4,062 ft)	Doddane
Kutirai Kallu		12°00′10″N 77°32′07″E	1,204 metres (3,950 ft)	Tokere
Galathavarai Betta		12°05′21″N 77°33′44″E	1,198 metres (3,930 ft)	Changadi
Doddamayil Betta		12°03′43″N 77°39′44″E	1,152 metres (3,780 ft)	Gopinatham
Jogamaran Betta		12°07′21″N 77°35′36″E	1,119 metres (3,671 ft)	Ponnachi

== Flora and fauna ==
Apart from being a pilgrimage centre, the Male Mahadeshwara Hills possess large tracts of forest area rich in sandalwood and bamboo. The landscapes of Betta and the valleys are covered with forests varying from evergreen forests in Ponnachi to dry deciduous forests in most other parts.

The forests of Male Mahadeshwara are inhabited by a variety of animals, birds and reptiles. They are found in large numbers too. Elephants are the most prominent species. The latest estimate puts the population of elephants are more than 2500 in the district, which includes Bandipur National Park too. Frequent sightings of guars (Indian bison), sambars, spotted deer, jackals, sloth bears, porcupine, etc., apart from rare sightings of tigers, leopards and wild dogs are possible in and around this area. The Male Mahadeshwara Reserve Forests, has an approximate area of 39361.45 hectares and has a few small villages like Ponnachi, Kombadikki, Kokkebore, Doddane, Tokere, Tulsikere, Puduru village, Thambadi street or Thambadigere, Palar, Gopinatham, Indiganatha, etc., as enclosures within the reserve forests.

According to media reports a decision to declare 906.18 km^{2} (349.88 sq mi) (90,618.75 hectares) of 1,224 km^{2} (473 sq mi) of the Kollegalaa Range forest as Male Mahadeshwara Wildlife Sanctuary was taken during the fifth meeting of the Karnataka Wildlife Board held on 15 December 2012. The then chief minister Jagadish Shettar, who presided over the meeting, approved this under Section 26A (I) (B) of the Wildlife Conservation Act, 1972, (Amendment 2006) on 7 May 2013. But the same information is yet to reflect on the website of the Karnataka Forest Department.
