= Panikhia Jati =

Group of higher castes in Odisha, India

Panikhia Jati (Odia: ପାଣିଖିଆ ଜାତି) also known as Panichhuan Jati (Clean castes) of Odisha. Which is a group of dominant and high rank castes. Which water and foods are acceptable for deities and also for Brahmins, includes: Karan, Khandayat, Gopal, Chasa,Gudia caste. There is a good social relation and communication among the castes. They are very strict for their social status or prestige; they do not take water and food from lower communities. But occasionally they allow Barika and Mali people to participate in their festivals and other rituals.
