= Raut (caste) =

Cattle herding caste of central India

Raut/Rawat
- राउत
- Religions: Hinduism
- Populated states: Chhattisgarh; Madhya Pradesh; Maharashtra

Raut (also spelled as Rout) is an Indian caste, whose traditional occupation is to rule.

The Rauts are mainly found in the Chhattisgarh state, and the neighbouring states of Madhya Pradesh and Maharashtra. Traditionally, they were predominantly distributed in the districts of Durg, Raipur, Bastar, Nagpur and Bhandara.

== History ==
Raut may have been a tribal militia in Chhota Nagpur, originating from the Kawar

== Culture ==
Traditionally, the Rauts were involved in herding and milking cattle. Traditionlly, their main business was sale of milk and milk products.

Raut Nacha is a traditional dance of the Raut community which is performed on Diwali. In this dance, the Rauts wear a special costume, sing and dance in a group with sticks in their hands in the village pathways.

The Raut men traditionally performed the local folk epic Candaini (or Chandaini) in a combination of dance and song. The epic tells the story of princess Chanda, who leaves her impotent husband and falls in love with a common man Veer Lorik. Both the characters are from the Raut caste, and the epic seems to have originated in this caste. As late as 1980, the Candaini performers used to be primarily from the Raut caste, but now people from other communities also take part in the performances.

In the 20th century, they underwent Sanskritisation, and adopted customs and values of the high-caste Hindus.

== Sub-castes and related groups ==
The main Raut sub-castes include Gawala, Thetwar, Jheriya, and Kosariya.

The Rauts are present in the central Chhattisgarh, along with other castes and sub-castes including Ahir, Brajwasi, Gawli, Gawali, Lingayat-Gaoli, Gowari (Gwari), Yadav, Thethwar, and Gop/Gopal.

== Bibliography ==
- Lok Nath Soni (2000). The cattle and the stick: an ethnographic profile of the Raut of Chhattisgarh. Anthropological Survey of India. ISBN 978-81-85579-57-3.
- Guptā, Śaśi (2022). Rāuta jāti kā samājaśāstrīya anuśīlana (in Hindi). Saṅkalpa Prakāśana. ISBN 978-93-91435-01-1.
- Sainī, Abhilāshā (2021). Rāuta jāti: udbhava evaṃ vikāsa (in Hindi). Saṅkalpa Prakāśana. ISBN 978-81-951646-6-0.
