= Folk dances of Sourashtra =

The Sourashtra people, also known as the Saurashtra, are an ethno-linguistic Hindu community of South India, who have a number of folk dances which are performed on various occasions. These include the Gebbi or Gebbel, the Konangi, and the Dandi natana (kolane).

== Gebbi ==
The Gebbi (Devanagari: गेब्बी) is usually performed by groups of women on various religious occasions. This dance goes around a lamp called "Thandili Diva" and before statues, idols or pictures of gods and goddesses. The dance incorporates circular and spiral movements with handclaps. Gebbi performances often include devotional (bhakti) songs, the singers either being within the dance group or separate. The word Gebbi is derived from Garba-graha, and the dance symbolises shakti, the primordial cosmic energy. The outer world's symbolic identification is a pot filled with pure water. In this water, gods and goddesses are called to reside temporarily for blessing. The basic dance formation is that of a circle that moves counterclockwise; if space is constrained or there are many participants, dancers form concentric circles that move in opposite directions. Ultimately, the performers circle around an image of a mother goddess, such as Amba, or around a symbolic representation of her creative energy—often an illuminated clay pot or a water-filled vessel. Dancing begins slowly and gradually increases in speed.

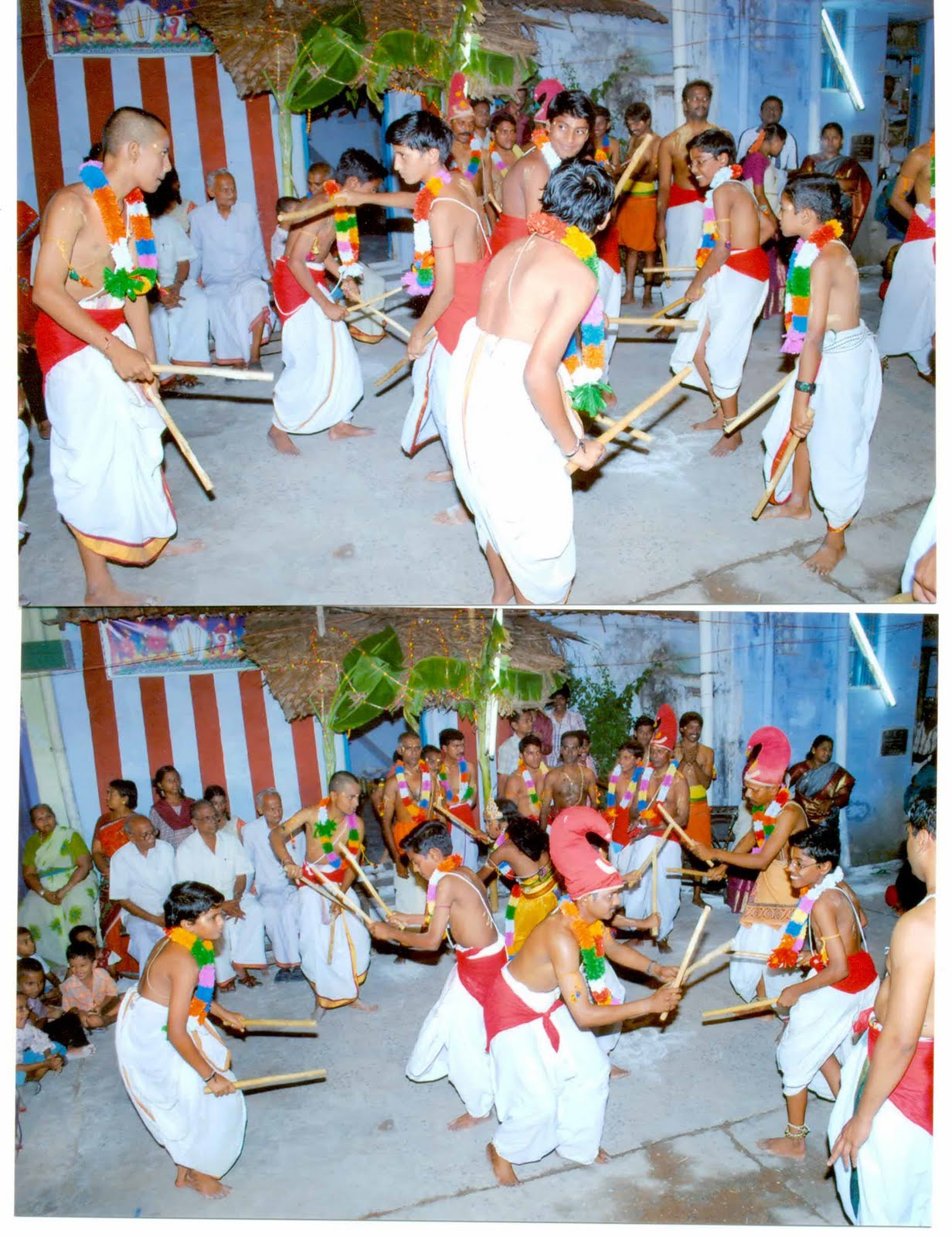
Dandi natana dance

== Dandi natana (kolane) ==
Dandi natana (Devanagari: दांडी नटना) is a stick dance which is also performed in a circular and spiral movement, by tapping the stick on the dancers on the opposite side. The number of performers can multiply from two, to four, to eight, sixteen, and so on.

== Konangi ==
Konangi (Devanagari: कोनंगी) is a jesters' dance performed by males. It usually takes place during the Hindu festival of Rama Navami. This dance is intended to narrate and preach the morals of the lives of Lord Rama and Lord Krishna. This is a social dance which preaches good thoughts to society.

The dance is based on a story told of Krishna's battle with the demon Dantavakra. When Krishna threw his Sudarshana Chakra (a spinning, disc-like weapon), Dantavakra caught it in his teeth. However, he was not able to open his mouth to release the Chakra, because the rotating weapon would cut him. Krishna then began to perform a humorous dance; seeing which, the demon could not refrain from laughter. He opened his mouth to laugh, and was killed by the Chakra. From this incident, the dance of Konangi was born.

== See also ==
- Dance in India
- List of Indian classical dance and music events
- Indian classical dance
