= Kangilu =

Traditional folk dance from India

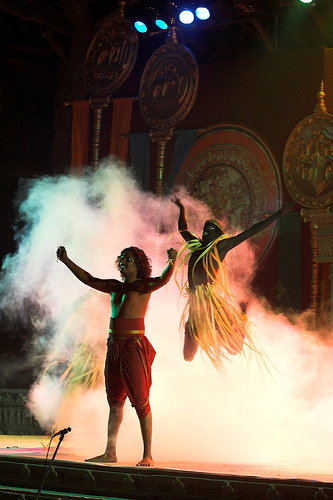
A Kangeelu dancer

Kangeelu or Kangilu is a traditional folk dance from Udupi and Dakshina Kannada region in the South Indian state of Karnataka. It is a spiritual dance performed on the full moon day in Mai month of Tulu calendar. It is believed to keep away disease, evil spirits, and other negative energy and serves to foster peace, harmony, and a community spirit. The dance is performed as a part of a seven day Kangilu Kunitha to propitiate the goddess Khadgeshwari and Koragajja, a spirit considered as a form of god Shiva.

== Etymology ==
In Tulu language, Kang means coconut derived from ancient Kangu. The dancers collect the top tender growth of the coconut tree and cover themselves along with dresses made of coconut or palm leaves.

== Background ==
It is a spiritual dance performed on the full moon day in Mai month of Tulu calendar, corresponding to March in the Gregorian calendar. The dance is generally performed by the mundaala community living in Udupi and Dakshina Kannada. The dance is conducted as a part of a seven day Kangilu Kunitha, to propitiate the goddess Khadgeshwari. It is performed by men in Dakshina Kannada while women perform the same in Udupi region. The dance ritual is conducted to send the evil forces out of the village and for the general well-being of the people and cattle, protection from diseases and for a bountiful harvest. As per beliefs, Koragajja, a form of god Shiva is invoked through the spiritual dance to end diseases. Koragajja is considered to be one of the most powerful and sacred spirits to whom people pray and promise to provide offerings when they face danger or when certain wishes needs to be fulfilled.

== Practice ==
There are 5 to 12 members in each group and the dancers dress and decorate themselves similarly and stand in a circle. The dancers wear heavy and colorful dresses as well as face paint.

They dance to the sound produced by the beats of instruments such as Kaase or Dholu. In the center of the circle, four singers wearing bells sing folk songs and the rest of the dance troupe dance to the tune of the songs. The traditional song played is called the Karungilo and at the end of the dance, a song called Aati Kalenje is performed. Amidst the dancing, a dancer appears wearing a mask and black paint smeared across the body imitating the spirit god Koragajja and dances in a unique way to draw the attention of the people. Other people surrounding the dances make noises and make Koo sounds.

The dancers dance in the morning and visit designated houses of the community in the night to collect alms, mainly grains and other offerings. With the collected grains, they get together and prepare a communal feast. Sometimes, after the dance ends, people cook coconuts and rice outside their homes. The ceremonial food is offered to the goddess Khadgeshwari, whose wooden statue is taken on procession to the outskirts of the village. Post the same, they remove their costumes and dip the palm leaves in the village tank. The food is then enjoyed by the community.

== See also ==
- List of Indian folk dances
