= Matki dance =

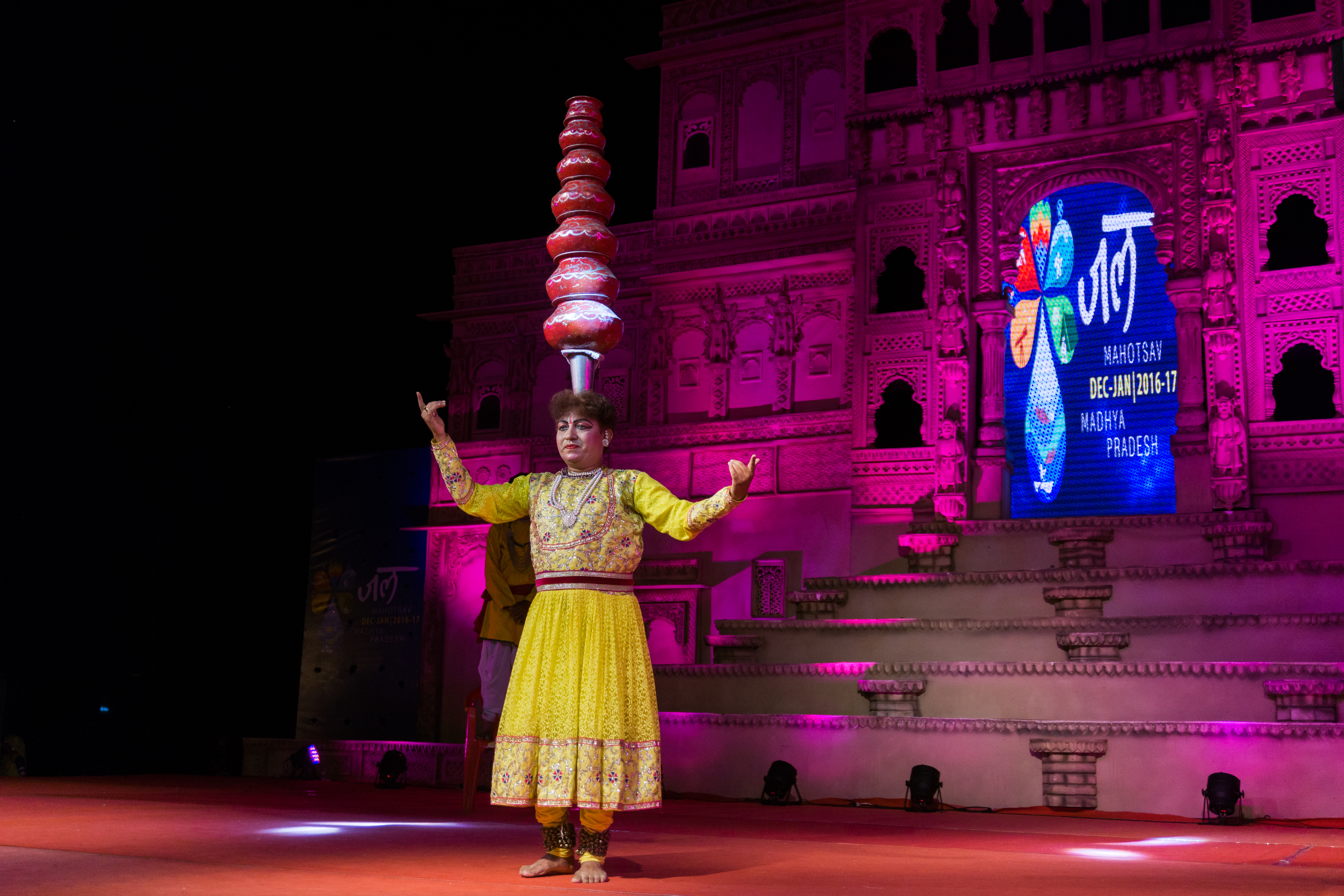
Matki dance at Jal Mahotsav 2016

Matki Dance is mostly performed in the Malwa region of Madhya Pradesh, India. It is a solo dance performed by ladies on special occasions like weddings, birthdays, or any other special occasion. In the Hindi language, matki means a small pitcher or a small earthenware pot. In this dance, the ladies are dressed in sarees or in lehanga decorated with many ornaments. The main musical instrument used in this dance is the dhol. Matki dance is generally performed in a circular position. Women balance an earthen pot on their head. They also have a veil on their face.

There are subtypes in this, known as Aada and Khada Nach.

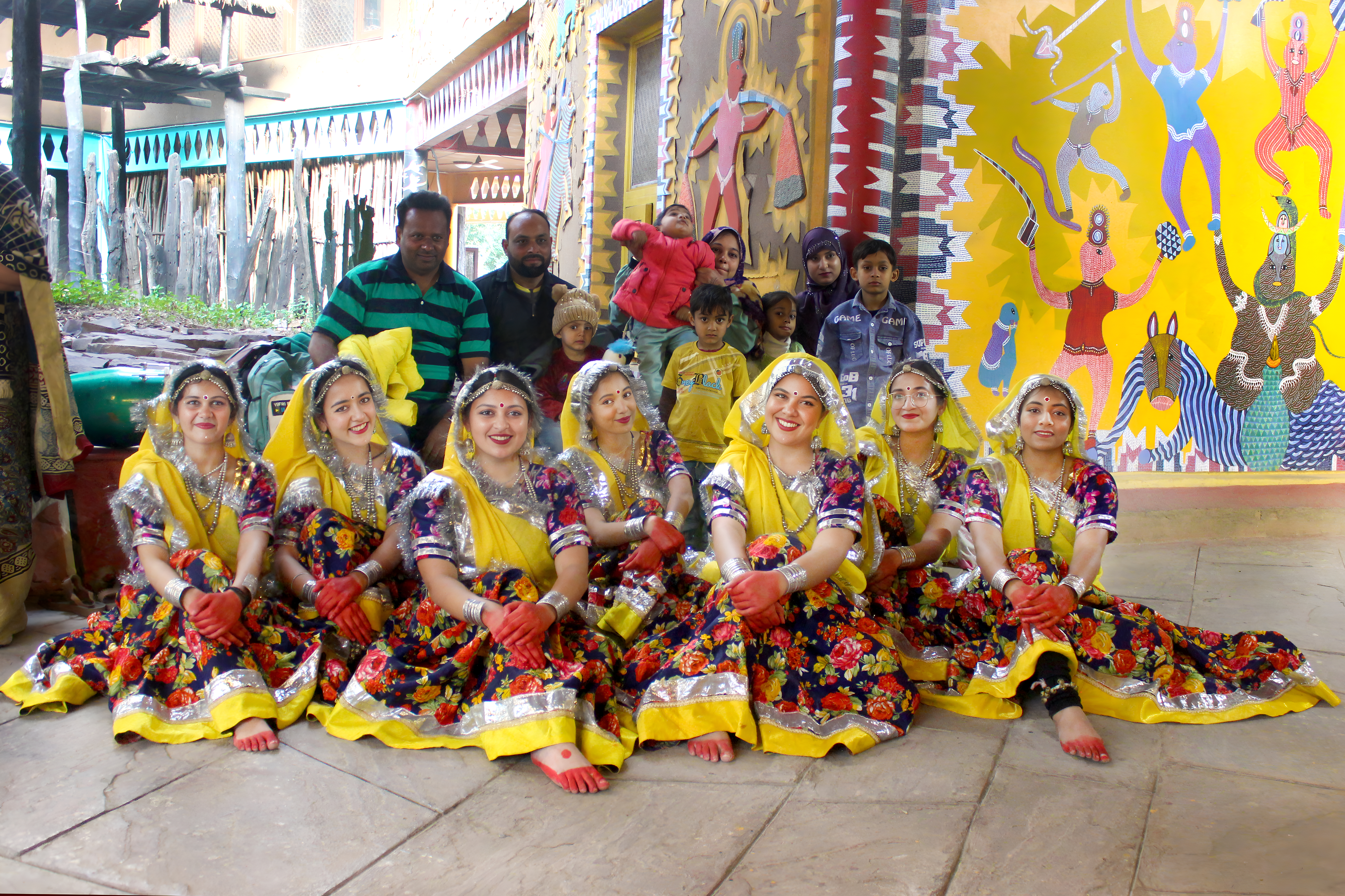
Matki dancer group from Ujjain India
