= Ponnachi =

- village
- Location in Karnataka, India Ponnachi (India)
- Coordinates: 12.15°N 77.10°E
- Country: India
- State: Karnataka
- District: Chamarajanagar
- Talukas: Kollegal

Government
  - Body: Gram panchayat

Population (2001)
  - Total: 5,908

Languages
  - Official: Kannada
- Time zone: UTC+5:30 (IST)
- ISO 3166 code: IN-KA

Ponnachi is a village in the southern state of Karnataka, India. It is located in the Hanur taluk of Chamarajanagar district. Which recently named as the First 5G Village in India.It present in eastern ghats, It is the last end village demarcates Karnataka and Tamil Nadu by river cauvery, Name ponnachi suggest that Ponna means gold, Aachi which is used to call for villages Tamil Nadu administration. It is the mining area and present mainly composed of igneous and metamorphic rocks of Pre-Cambrian age either exposed at the surface or covered with a thin mantle of residual and transported soils. The rock formation in the district falls into two groups, Charnockite series and granite genesis and gneissic granite. The village has a nice cinematic view with surrounded by mesa type of mountains.

Soliga is the main tribe in the village.

The Ponnachi Grama Panchayath consist of

Asthuru

Maruru

Jayammana Doddi, Doddabetta

Gerattii, Meghanuru, Gundiseedu

Kakkehola, Ramegowdana Halli

Ponnachi

GHPS 1-7

SSKPS 8-10

Girijana Ashrama school for Schedule tribe students from 1- 5 th in Jayammana Doddi

GHPS in Asthuru

GHPS in Maruru

== Demographics ==
As of 2001 India census, Ponnachi had a population of 5908 with 3120 males and 2788 females.

== See also ==
- HANUR
- Chamarajanagar
- Districts of Karnataka
