= Kamsale =

Folk art

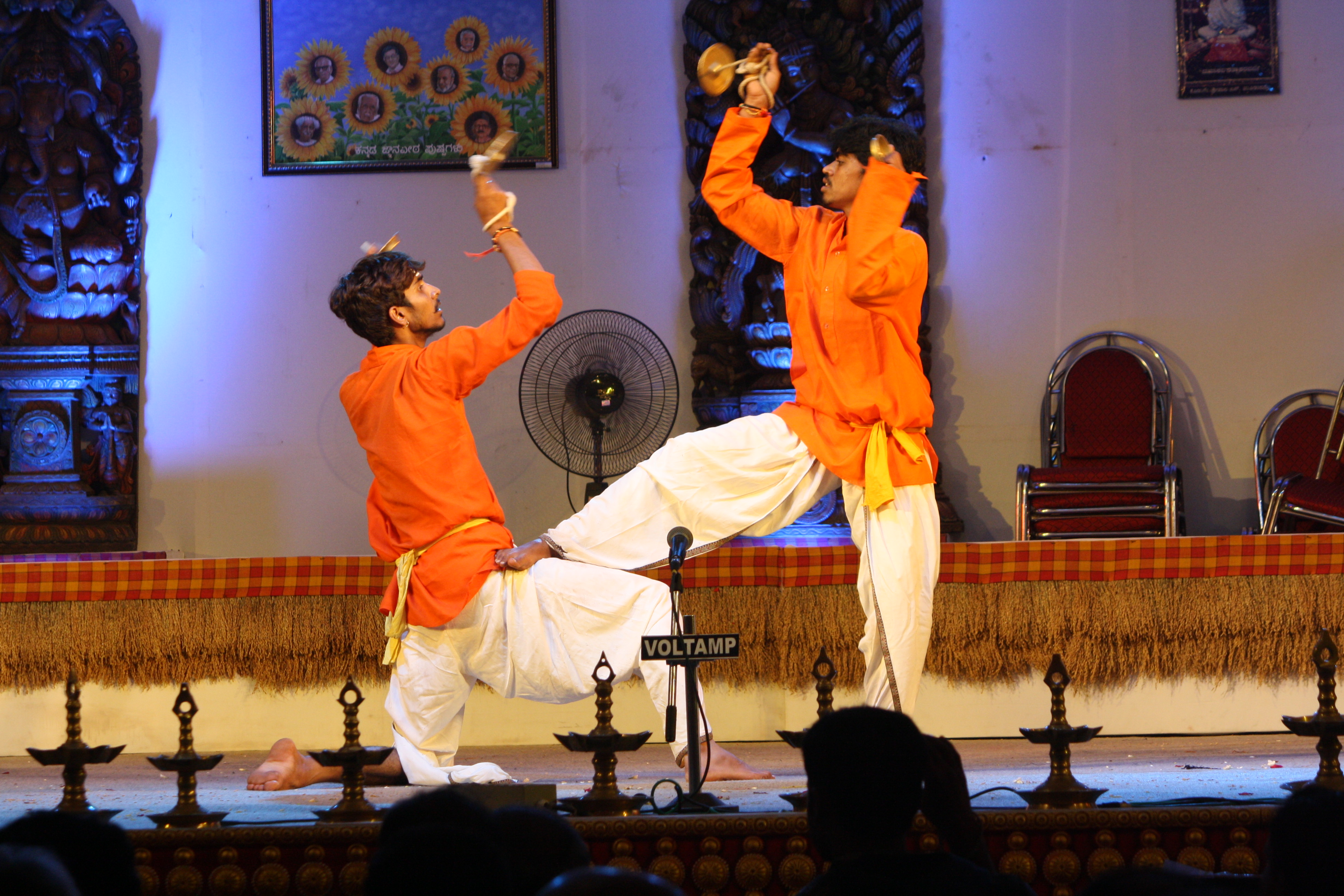
Karnataka's folklore Beesu Kamsale a variety of Kamsale

Kamsale (Kannada: ಕಂಸಾಳೆ ನೃತ್ಯ), is a folk art performed by the devotees of God Mahadeshwara. It is performed using Kamsale, brass made idiophones (musical instrument). It's a popular folk art in Southern Karnataka especially Chamarajanagara, Ramanagara, Mandya and Mysore, Kollegal, Nanjangudu and outskirts of Bengaluru.

== Instrument and group ==
Kamsale is an 11th century instrument. Its also called Kaitala and Batlu in ancient texts like Bheema Kavi's Basava Purana, Virupakshapandita's Chennabasava Purana, Harihara's Girija Kalyana and Keshiraja's Shabdamanidarpana.

The term Kamsya tala is derived from Sanskrit meaning bronze cymbals. The Kamsale is in pairs like cymbals but each are not identical like the jalra, another cymbal like musical instrument. One part of the Kamsale is called adi battalu, which is cup like shaped with broad base and represents the sky while the other is called gari ehich is slightly flat and represents the earth.

The artists in the Kamsale group vary from three to eight. If the Kamsale is accompanied by songs, the number of artists will be from 8 to 12.

== Background ==
"Kamsale", popularly known as "Devaraguddas", belongs to the Halumatha (Kuruba Gowda) community who are disciples of Lord Mahadeshwara. Kamsale Mela is a popular folk song which deals with the history of 'Mahadeshwara' (worshipping deity) of Mahadeshwara hills, a renowned pilgrim centre, situated in Chamarajanagar district

== Literature ==
Kamsale artists have no printed literature. They learn those songs orally. They participate in fairs, which are held in Mahadeshwara hills during Diwali, Shivaratri and Ugadi festivals.

== Kuruba People ==
Kamsale is closely connected with a tradition of Shiva worship. The artistes, drawn from Haalumatha Kuruba Gowda community. Who have vowed to live a life of devotion to Mahadeshwara are supposed to perform kamsale. The dance is a part of a 'diiksha' or oath and is taught by teacher or spiritual leader. Kamsale Mahadevaiah of Mysore was a famous artist. He trained students at university level. In cultural exchange programme of India, he toured many countries and performed.

== Dress and dance ==
The singing artists wear a special dress. The artists, with the Kamsale in the left hand, expose it to be hit by the Kamsale held in the right hand. Thus rhythm is created of various patterns and tempos. Beesu Kamsale or Kamsale dance is a unique dance form in which religious fervour combines with martial dexterity. The instruments, in the course of the vigorous rhythmic beatings are moved around the body of the dancer in innumerable patterns manifesting both skill and art. The main element in art is the rhythmic clang, which blends with the melodious music of the Mahadeshwara epic. In a group movement the dancer provides the vision of a series of offensive and defensive manoeuvers, which is a testimony to the Kuruba people being of Martial stock.

== Spread ==
The Kamsale dancers are found in the Kannada, Mysore, Channapatna, Mandya, Ramanagara, Kanakapura, Kollegal, Bangalore and Chamarajanagara region.
