= Padhar dance =

Folk dance of Gujarat, India, performed by Padhar

The Padhar dance is a folk dance of Gujarat, India. It is performed by Padhar, a fishermen community living along banks Nal Sarovar of Bhal region.

The dancer holds small sticks in his hands while dancing. They enact rowing of boats while dancing. They sing songs associated with water.
