= Padhar =

Hindu caste

The Padhar (Sindhi: پڌڙ) are a Hindu caste found in the state of Gujarat in India.

== History and origin ==
The Padhar are distributed in six villages in Surandarnagar and four villages in Ahmadabad District. Their main villages are Shahpur, Sahiyal, Dharji, Devadthal, Nam Katechi, Ranagadh, Ralol, Parali, Parnala, Godi and Anandpur. They claim to have originated in Sindh, and their existence is due to the grace of Hinglaj mata, a Hindu goddess. The Padhar have been given scheduled tribe status, and speak Gujarati. According to some traditions, they were originally Koli people, although this claim is denied by the Kolis.

== Present circumstances ==
The Padhar community consists of a number of clans, each of which are exogamous. Their main clans are the Domda, Bhuvatra, Samatiya, Pachani, Devthala, Lalni, Tanhada, Sapra, Kanotra, and Dharjiya. The Vatra, Pachani and Lalni clans do not intermarry, as they descend from common ancestor. They are strictly endogamous, and are a not share her daughter with dalit community. The Padhar are mainly small scale peasant farmer, with many are now landless. Many Padhar are fishermen, as their villages lie on the shores of Nal Sarovar lake. Other occupations include grass cutting, root digging which they sell to neighbouring villages. As the Nal Sarovar lake attracts tourists, many also rent out their boats to the tourists. They are also known for their folk dance form Padhar dance.
