= Domni =

Dance form in West Bengal, India

Domni is a dance performed in West Bengal of India.

This dance form is mainly based on drama. Roles of husbands, wives, mothers, greedy moneylenders, peasant, etc. are main characters in this.
