= Palar River (Kaveri basin) =

Coordinates: 11°35′43.5″N 77°15′46.5″E

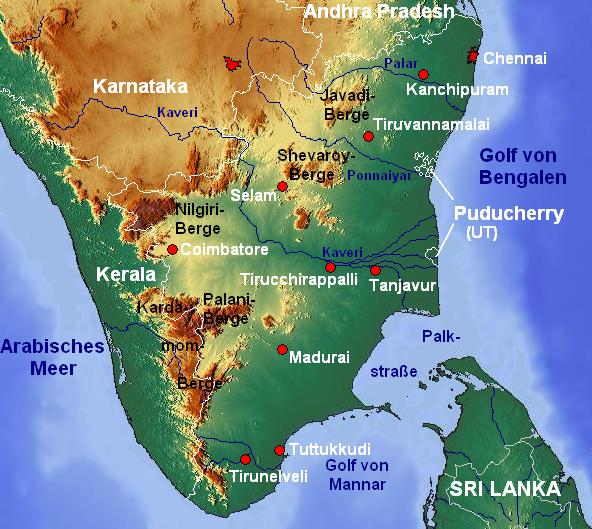
- Map showing the river

Physical characteristics
- Source
  - location: Near Guthiyalathur, Bhavani, Erode, Tamil Nadu
  - elevation: 1260m
- Mouth
  - location: Kaveri River, near Palar
  - elevation: 220m

Palar is a river in the Indian states of Karnataka and Tamil Nadu. It originates near Guthiyalathur in Bhavani Taluk of Erode district in Tamil Nadu and forms border between Karnataka and Tamil Nadu. Later, it flows into the Kaveri River near Palar in Karnataka and Tamil Nadu.

== 1993 Bomb blasts ==
This River is infamous for the 1993 blasts that took place on the banks of the River from sandalwood smuggler Veerappan.

== See also ==
- Hogenakkal Falls
- List of rivers of Tamil Nadu
- Kaveri River water dispute
- Kaveri River
