= Teratali =

Folk dance of Rajasthan and Madhya Pradesh

Tertali
- Genre: Folk dance
- Instrument: Manjiras (small metal cymbals)
- Origin: Kamar tribes, Rajasthan and Madhya Pradesh, India

Tertali or teratali also known as Terah Taali folk dance is performed by Kamar tribes in Rajasthan and Madhya Pradesh. It is an elaborate ritual with many different types of dance. It is generally performed by two or three women who sit on the ground. Thirteen Manjiras (small metal cymbals) are tied to different parts of the body. The head is covered with a hat or petha. At times a small sword is clenched between the teeth and an ornamental pot is balanced on the head.
