= Lingada Birana Kunitha =

Lingada Birana Kunitha is a folk dance in India performed mainly people belonging to the Kuruba Community. This dance is widespread in the southern parts of Karnataka state and where the dancers perform splendidly, holding a sword in one hand and a shield bearing their religious emblem in the other to the tune of the devotional narration.
