= List of Indian classical dance and music events =

Indian classical dance is an umbrella term for various codified art forms rooted in Natya, the sacred Hindu musical theatre styles, whose theory can be traced back to the Natya Shastra of Bharata Muni (400 BC). Various classical dance events are held annually across India in various cities.

This includes events related to:

- Hindustani Classical Music (e.g. Music Festivals like Sawai Gandharvain Pune)
- Surashree Kesarbai Kerkar Sangeet Samaroh, Goa
- Pt Jitendra Abhisheki Music Festival in Goa
- Master Dinanath Mangeshkar Smriti Sangeet Samaroh Goa.
- Pt.Ratnakant Ramnathkar Smriti Samaroh, Goa
- Smt.Anjanibai Malpekar Smriti Sangeet Sammelan, Goa
- Pt.Govindrao Agni and Smt.Anjanibai Lolyenkar Smriti Sangeet Samaroh, Canacona, Goa.
- PT SHRIDHAR PARSEKAR SANGEET SAMMELAN, Goa,
- Anahat Naad Sangeet Sammelan, Goa.
- Girijabai Kelekar Smriti Samaroh, Goa
- Pt. RajaRam bua Manjrekar Smriti Samaroh
- Kolkata International Dance Festival, Kolkata.
- Events in Carnatic Music
- Indian Dances like Bharata Natyam, Kathak, Kathakali, Kuchipudi, Manipuri, Mohiniyattam, Odissi, Sattriya, etc.

It does not include pure Bollywood programs.

== Tirumala ==
=== 365 DAYS ===
NAADANEERAJANAMl

Naadaneeraajanam programme is one of the most prestigious and popular programmes in Sri Venkateswara Bhakthi Channel. The programme is designed by TT Devasthanams to popularize Indian classical art of Music and Dance and also to preserve the cultural heritage of fine arts in devotional way. This programme is jointly organized TTD & SVBC and runs for 365 days without any break.

== Mumbai ==
=== January ===
Teen Prahar

- Teen Prahar is a famous Music Concert organized by Banyan Tree since 2007
- Usual Venue: Auditorium Like Ravindra Natya Mandir, Prabhadevi
- Tickets availability: 1 week before the event
- Online booking: bookmyshow.com
- Schedule:11:59 P.M
- Duration: one day about eight hours
- Website: http://banyantreeevents.com/teen-prahar-home.html

==== Ninad Concert Series ====
A regular Festival of Indian Classical Dances

- Usual Venue - Sathye College Auditorium
- Tickets availability - on the venue
- Online Booking - NA
- Schedule -11:59 P.M
- Duration - One day, Four hours
- Website - http://www.kongregate.com/games/turbonuke/cyclomaniacs-2

Sharada Sangeet Mahotsav

- Sharada Sangeet Vidyalaya is a leading educational institution in the Western suburbs. It holds an annual festival of music every year in the last fortnight of the calendar year.
- Usual Venue : Bandra, Mumbai
- Tickets availability : Open program, no tickets
- Online booking : NA
- Schedule : last fortnight of the calendar year
- Duration : Three days

CR Vyas Vandan

- As the name suggests, held around 10th Jan
- Usual Venue : Auditorium in Chembur, Prabhadevi, etc.
- Tickets availability : Open program, no tickets
- Online booking : http://www.kongregate.com/games/turbonuke/cyclomaniacs-2
- Schedule : around 10th Jan
- Duration : Two days

Kinkini Festival - Classical Dance National Youth Festival

- An Annual Festival of Indian Classical Dance
- Organised by Sarfojiraje Bhosale Centre, Mumbai
- Usual Venue : P. L. Deshpande Maharashtra Kala Academy, 3rd floor, Mini Auditorium, Ravindra Natya Mandir Campus, Prabhadevi, Mumbai - 400025.
- Tickets availability : Open program, no tickets
- For Applications and inquiry : www.drsanddhyavpureccha.in
- Duration : One day

== See also ==
- List of Indian dances
- Indian classical dance
- List of Indian folk dances
- Folk dance in India
- List of ethnic, regional, and folk dances by origin
- Indian classical dancer
