= Grida dance =

New Indian dances

Grida Dance is an Indian folk dance from Madhya Pradesh, celebrated during the harvest of the Rabi crop. The dance prioritizes community, with people from different villages converging to celebrate and perform the dance.

== Elements ==
The dance, which consists of three parts, being Sela, Selalarki, and Selabhadoni. The dance begins with Sela, which is defined by steady and slow footwork. In the second part, Selalarki, the footwork becomes faster and more energetic. In the final part, Selabhadoni, the dancers stop their footwork and sway their body while performing the dance.
