= Kai silambattam =

Tamil folk dance

Kai silambattam is an ancient folk dance practiced mainly in Tamil Nadu. It is usually performed by women holding a silambu (a type of anklet) in their hands. The dancers generally make specific rhythms using the anklet. The dance is usually dedicated to Hindu gods or goddesses and performed during festivals and village festivities.

== Technique ==
Female dancers wearing ankle-bells and holding a silambu in their hands, make rhythmic noises while dancing. The metal silambu is shaken and rattled with the hand in a rhythmic synchronisation to make various noises. There is no prescribed number of people involved in the dance, and it is generally performed in pairs of even number of artists ranging from two to eight.

The dance is performed by people of all ages, who possess the physical energy to perform the dance. Senior artistes often teach younger artistes as a form of tradition. The dance is accompanied by music from traditional Tamil instrument called Pambai. The art form is also called Pambai silambattam associated with the music instrument. The dance is also performed by male dances during festivals.

== Costume and accessories ==
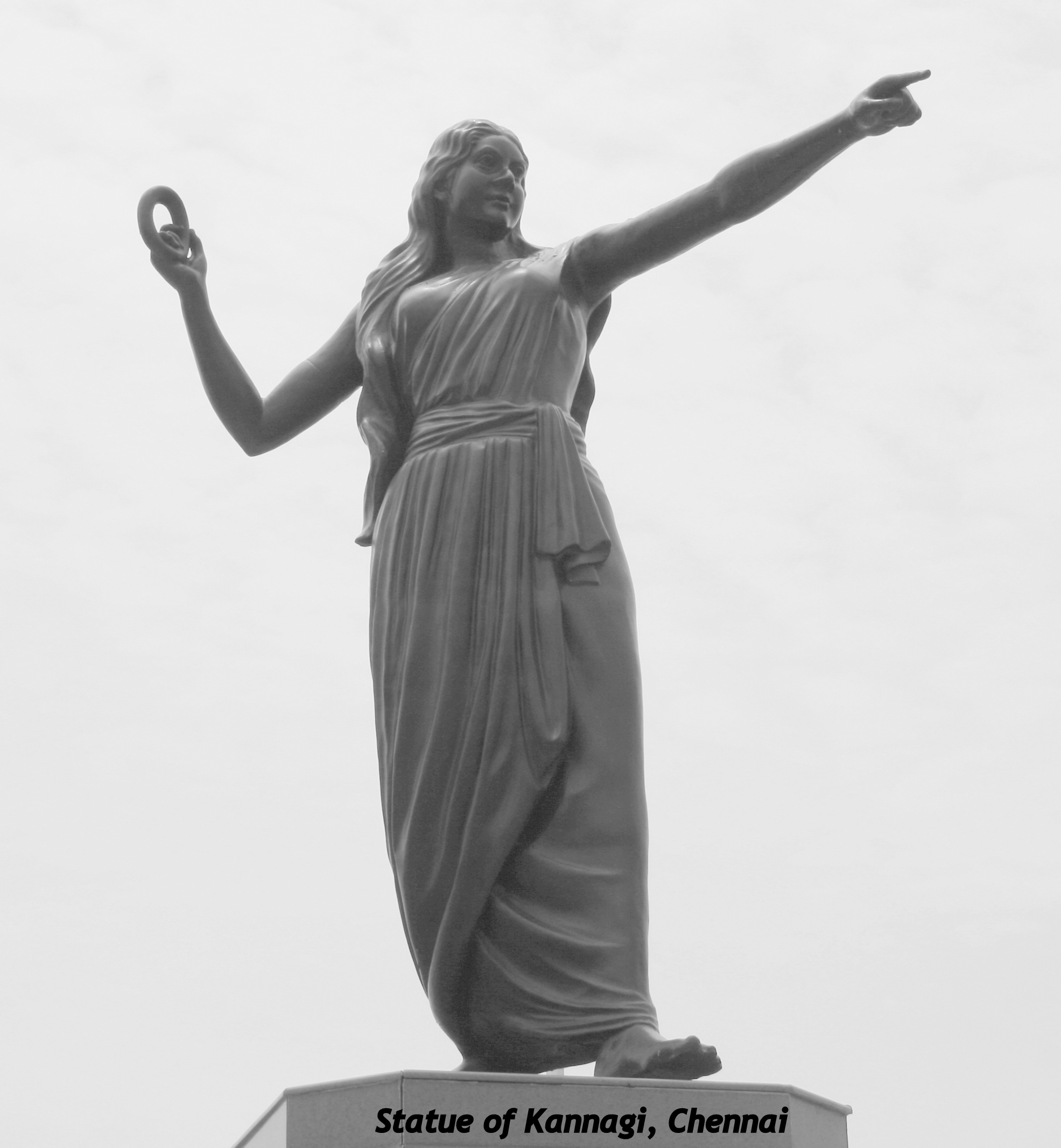
Kannaki holding a silambu in her hand (a scene from Cilappatikaram)

There is no prescribed costume for this art form. Silambu is the main accessory used in the dance. A silambu is typically known as kal chilambu (leg anklet) as it is worn on the leg. It is usually a hollow tubular metal structure in the form of a ring. The dance is called kai silambattam as the silambu is held in the hand, and to specifically distinguish it from the martial art form of silambattam.

The silambu is made of metals such as silver, or copper. It consists of metal beads or pellets inside, which make a noise when rattled. It finds mention in early Tamil literature from the sangam period. It forms the basis of the Sangam literature Cilappatikaram, which is named after it. The dancers wear anklets or ankle-bells, which also produce sounds along with the silambu.

== Occasion ==
The dance is mostly performed in temples, as a way of worship or veneration of the deities. It is performed in temples during Amman festivals or Navaratri festival especially to praise female deities like Durga or Kali. It is also performed during festivals and village festivities. For example, it is performed on auspicious days and as a part of Thaipusam festivities along with kavadi. It is also performed during special occasions such as marriages and ear-boring ceremonies. It is also performed on stage as a part of cultural activities.

== Areas of practice ==
Kai silambattam is an ancient folk dance practiced mainly in Tamil Nadu. It is predominantly practiced in the northern districts of Dharmapuri, Kancheepuram, Ranipet, Tiruvannamalai, and Vellore, and certain other districts such as Thanjavur, and Nagapattinam.
