= Phulpati dance =

Phulpati dance is performed in Malwa region of India. This dance is performed by unmarried girls. It is performed on the occasion of Holi. This folk dance is very popular in the Malwa region of Madhya Pradesh, India. Dancers wear very colourful costumes and beautiful ornaments during this dance performance. The main purpose of the dance style is to enable unmarried women to celebrate the 'Holi' festival with a bang. Apart from the rural areas, this dance is also performed in the semi-rural area

== History ==
The dance originally originated from the Malwa region of Madhya Pradesh to allow unmarried women to celebrate the festival of Holi with fanfare. Phulpati folk dance is associated with the Dashain festival in Madhya Pradesh, which is celebrated for fifteen days. The seventh day of this festival is called Phulpati, which is considered the most auspicious day of the festival. The padayatra organised during the festival becomes a social gathering where people meet and greet each other.
