= Pavri Nach =

Pavri Nach is a dance performed by the Kokna tribe in the hilly regions of northwest Maharashtra and adjoining region of Gujarat in India.

The dance is also known as Tarpha Nach because the music is played using wind instruments made of dried gourd.
