= Gopal (caste) =

Social community of Odisha, India

Gopal (Gauda)
- Classification: Ahir (Yadav)
- Religions: Hinduism
- Languages: Odia
- Populated states: Odisha
- Population: 431,474 (1901 census); 890,702 (1931 census)
- Subdivisions: Mathurapuria; Gopapuria; Magadhaa
- Related groups: Khandayat

Gopal or Gouda is an Indian caste, from Odisha State in East India. Their traditional occupations include dairy farming, cattle herding, cultivation and carrying palanquins of deities and other social communities. They also worked as Paikas (soldiers) under the kings. Gopal is the name of the milkmen or herdsmen caste in Odisha, which is known by other names (such as Ahir, Yadav, Goala etc.) in various parts of India. They are included in the OBC (Other Backward Class) list.

According to the 1931 census of India, they are the second largest caste by numbers and comprise around 9% of Odisha's population.

== Etymology ==
The word Gopal derived from vedic "Gopala", which "Go" refers to cow and "Pala" refers to protector or herder. Hence "Gopala" literally means "cow herder".

== Origin and history ==
The Gopalas (Gaudas) like all Yadavs claim that they are descendants from Krishna of the ancient Yadava clan.

After the Sanskritisation of castes in India, the Gopalas started to be incorporated into a newly established Yadav Kshatriya or Yaduvanshi Kshatriya community, along with Ahir, Gops, Goalas, and Sadgops. In the Yadav Mahasabha held in 1930, dairy farming castes such as Ahirs, Goalas, Gopalas etc. were advised to Identify themselves as "Son of Krishna" and hence they can identify themselves as martial caste.

== Subdivisions ==
The Gopalas (Gaudas) are three types:- Mathurapuria, Gopapuria and Magadhaa, where Mathurapurias and Gopapurias are superior to Magadha classes. Which symbolically refer to their ancestral land of Mathura and Gokul (Gopa) of Uttar Pradesh and Magadha of Bihar. While the Magadha Gauda are inhabitants of Singhbhum and western Mayurbhanj, they possibly represent an accretion of some aboriginal tribes. There are minor differences among them, some area of Odisha the Gopalas are also known as their other names including: Mahakul, Sholakhandia, Sadgope and Gopal Baishnab among them.

== Culture ==
=== Festival ===
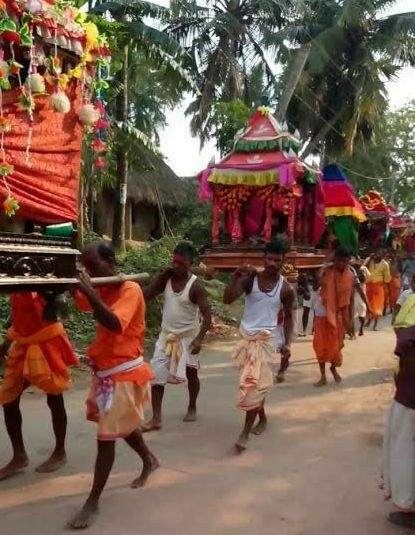
Peoples of Gopal community carries Bimana of Radha Krishna during Dola Purnima festival

- The Dola Purnima (Holi festival): is the Major festival of Gopalas (Gaudas), It starts from the tenth day of the bright fortnight of the month of Falguna (Feb-March) known as Fagu 'Dasami'. This festival is celebrated for five days in Odisha. In this festival they place the idols of Radha Krishna in a Bimana (richly decorated palanquins), Smearing the heads with Abira (a violet coloured powder). Specially people of Gopala community carrying this palanquin and take round a procession with village Priest, drummers, pipers and the Sankirtana Mandalis. The procession halts in front of each household and the deity is offered Bhog. On the final day of the purnima the celebration culminates in a swing-festival for the deities.
- The Dahi-handi Jatra (curd-pot festival): The birthday of Lord Krishna on the eighth day of Krushna pakshya is popularly celebrated throughout India as Janmastami on the ninth day. Lord Krishna along with his friends had broken the curd-pot in the house of the king Nanda. This tradition is maintained in Paralakhemundi as Dahi-handi-Jatra. On the ninth day or Nabami, the people tie a curd pot with a bamboo and place it between two poles. Traditionally, a Gauda-boy as the representative of Lord Krishna breaks the curd pot. The other boys throw the coloured water from a hand pump (pichakari). Then the people place the Radha Krishna on a stage called 'Kunja’ and take a procession around the town.

=== Tradition ===
- Laudi Badi Khela is a traditional dance with combination of martial art and folk dance (called Laudi Nacha & Badi Khela) of the Gaudas (Gopalas), which is performed during Dola Purnima. In this dance the young Gopala boys wearing a special clothes in associated with Krishna. At first they practice 'Badi Khela'(martial art) by one or two trained people of their community, who held a sword in the right hand and a stick in left hand. They perform this art for sometime and then played 'Laudi'(folk dance) by a group of minimum 9 to 12 boys. Each boys holding two stick in their hand, dance with striking each other's stick in a rhythmical manner in front of the Palanquin of Radha Krishna.
- Gopalila is a traditional puppet theatre, performed by Gopals (Cowherd boys) of Odisha. They perform this theater on the occasion of Janmastami and Govardhan Puja. The concept of this theatre is associated with god Krishna's life.

=== Titles ===
The Gopalas uses surnames like Behera, Das, Palei/Palai, Pandab, Biswal, Sandha, Hati, Kabi, Bhutia, Mahakul, Mahakhud/Mahakud, Mohapatra, Sasmal, Rout, Parida, Podh, Jal, Bhujabal, Khilar, Singh, Routray, Samantray, Pratihari, Mandei, Senapati, Dalua, Apata, Nayak, Bagarti, Pradhan, Khuntia, Bag/Bagh, Hansha, Dalchhatra, Kharsel, Karuan, Nag and Shandh, Banchhor among others.

== Social Status ==
Gopalas are followers of Vaishnavism. Among them Gopapurias and Sadgops are the relics of Bala Gopala cult. They are one of a caste of Panikhia Jati group of Odisha. They assist Brahmins on ritual occasion and also serve as priests in some temples. They claim Kshatriya status and in social hierarchy they occupies the rank next to Khandayats. They are included in the OBC list of the state.

== See also ==
- Ahir
- Gopa (caste)
- List of Yadavs
- Maniyani (caste)
- Raut (caste)
- Yadav
