= Keisabadi =

Type of dance

Keisabadi is a type of dance performed in Odisha. This type of dance is performed only by men. During the dance, people sing in native Kosli language similar to Sambalpuri language. In every stanza, the dancers shout "Haido!" The dance is based on the love story of Radha and Krishna. The dancers hold sticks of two feet length and they tap and strike the sticks in rhythmic form in harmony with the tempo of the song.
