= Raut Nacha =

Type of dance

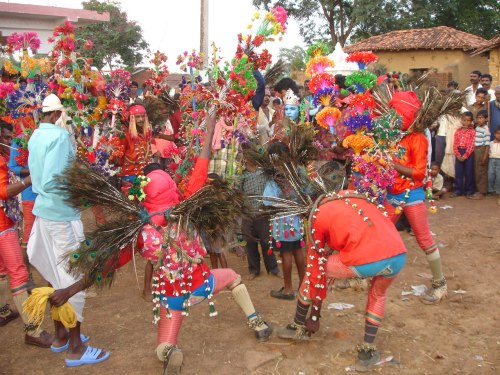
- Raut Nacha performed in Chhattisgarh, India
- Inventor: Raut caste
- Origin: India

Raut Nacha is a dance performed by people of the Raut caste as a form of worship to Krishna. They perform the dance at the time of 'dev udhni ekadashi'. It is believed that it is time of awakening of Gods after brief rest according to Hindu panchang (calendar).
