= Dance forms of Tamil Nadu =

Dance forms of Tamil Nadu
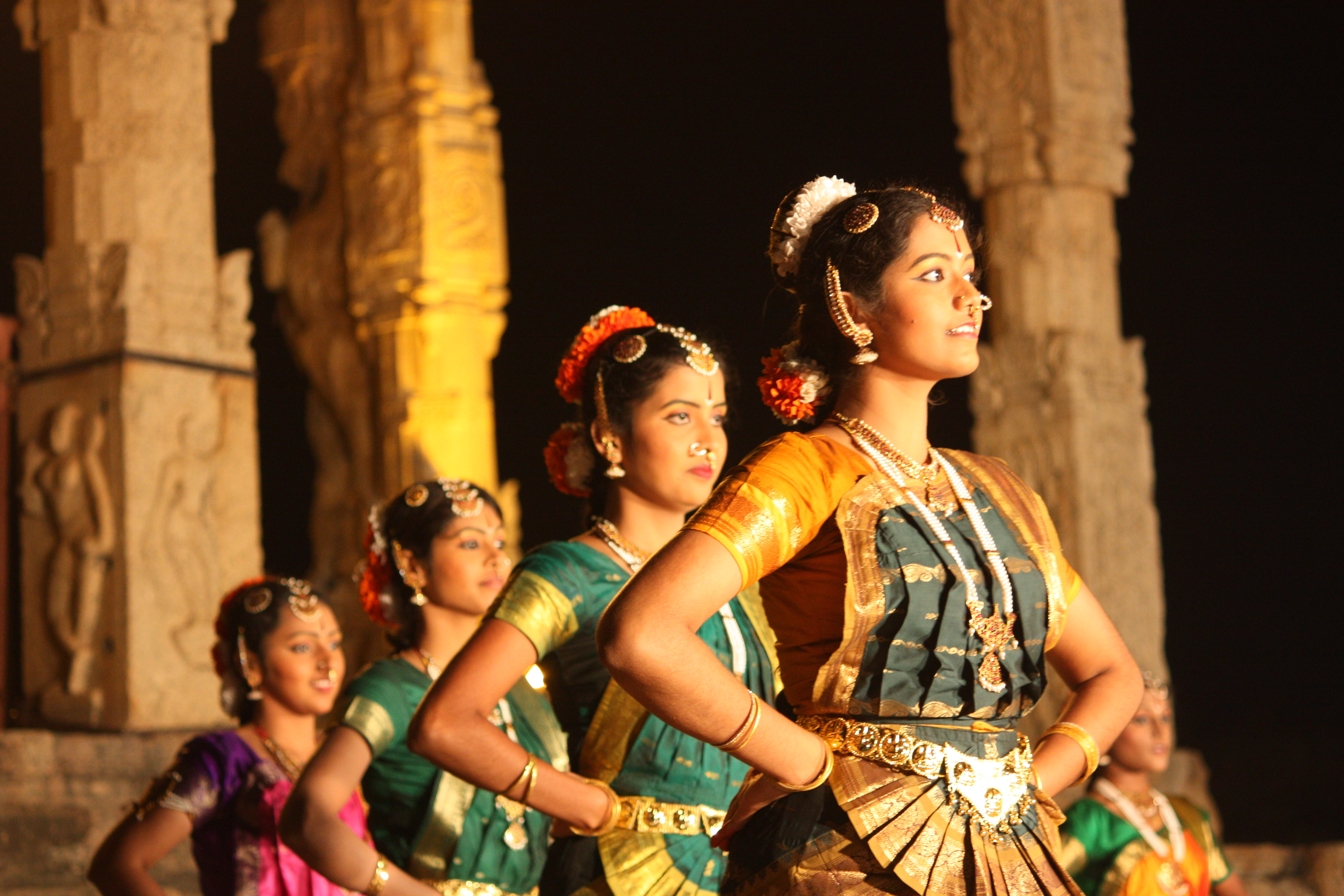
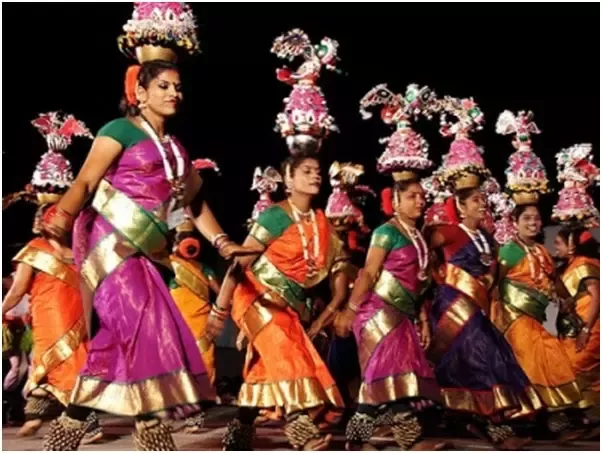
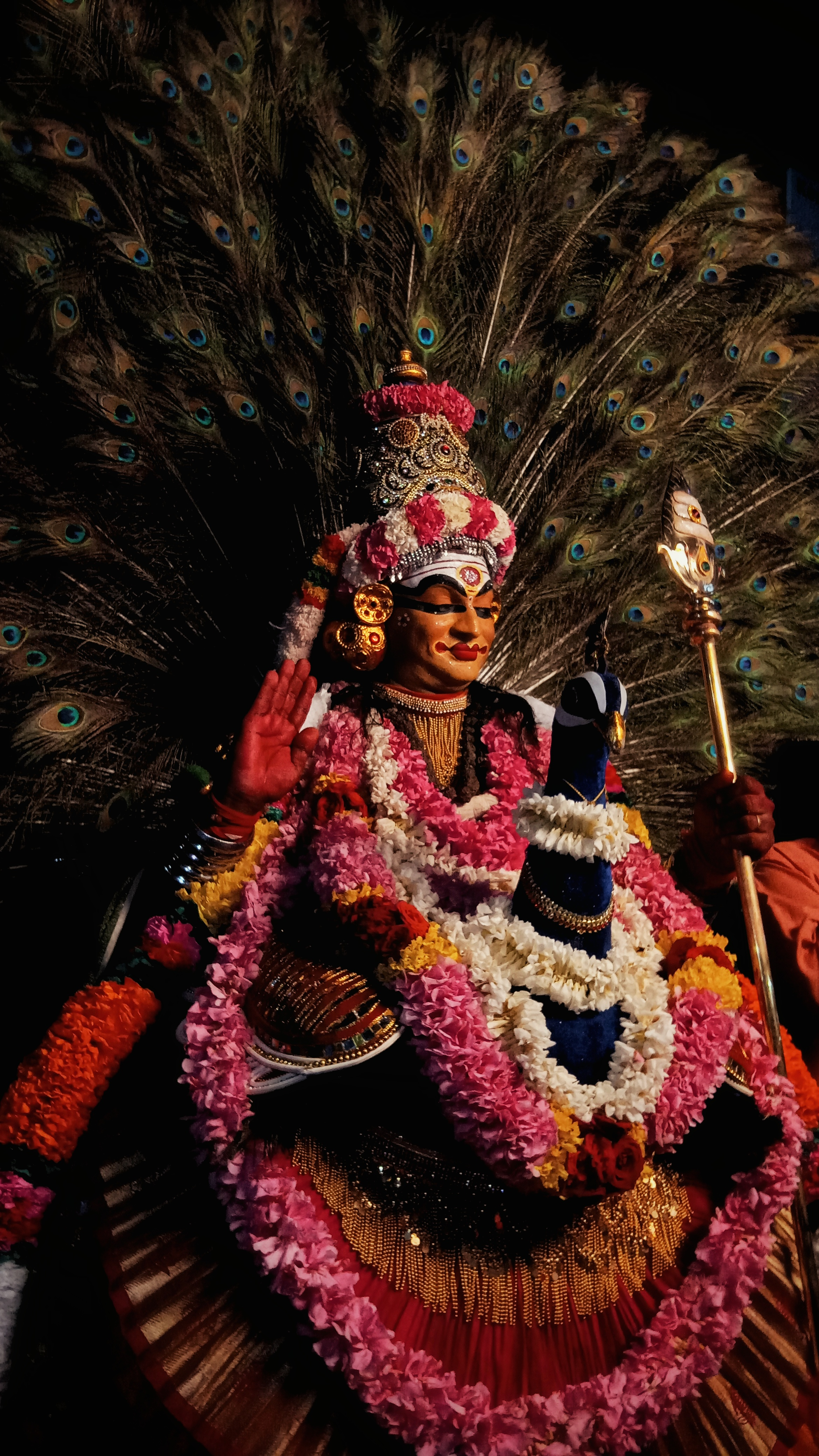
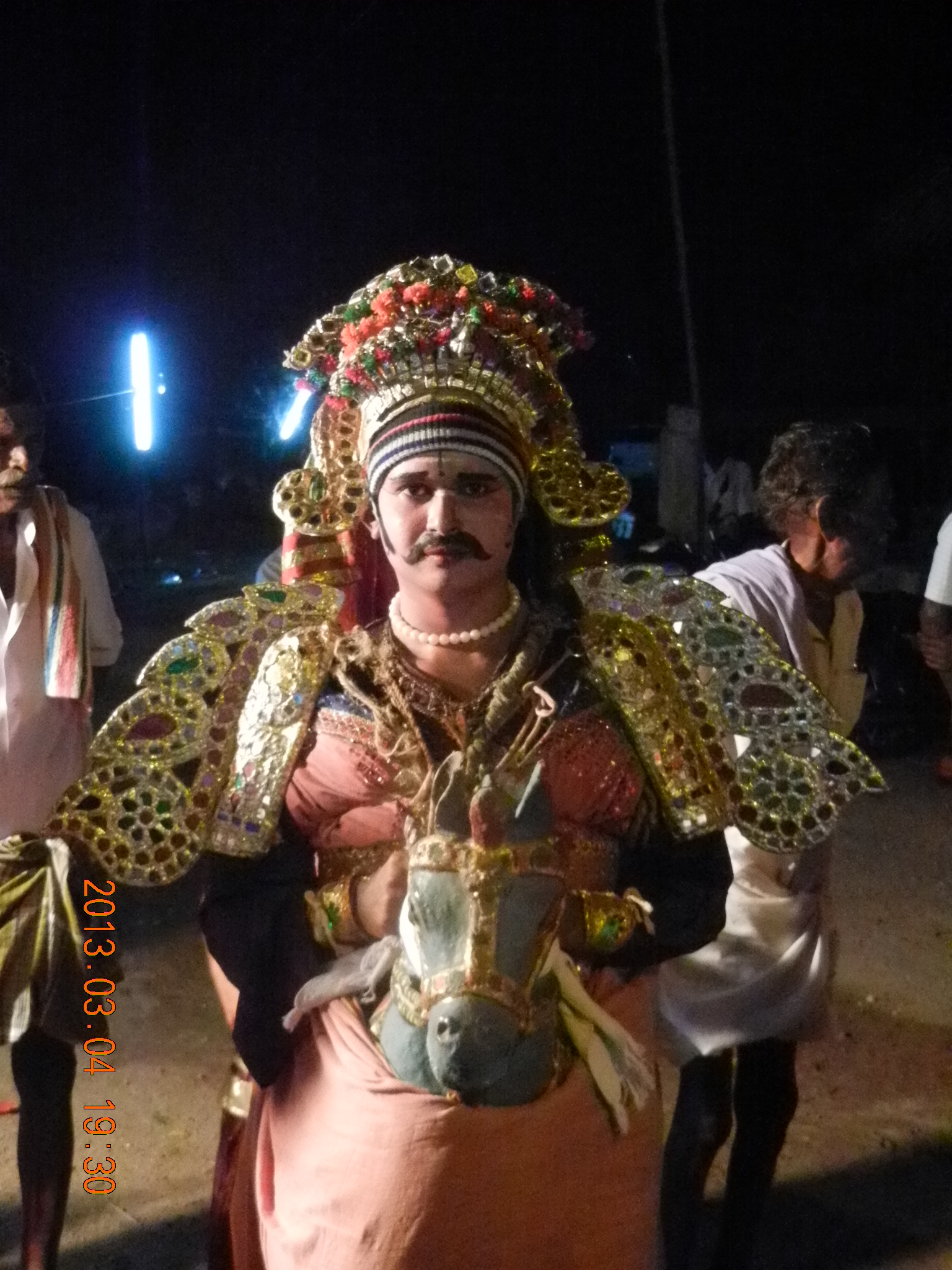
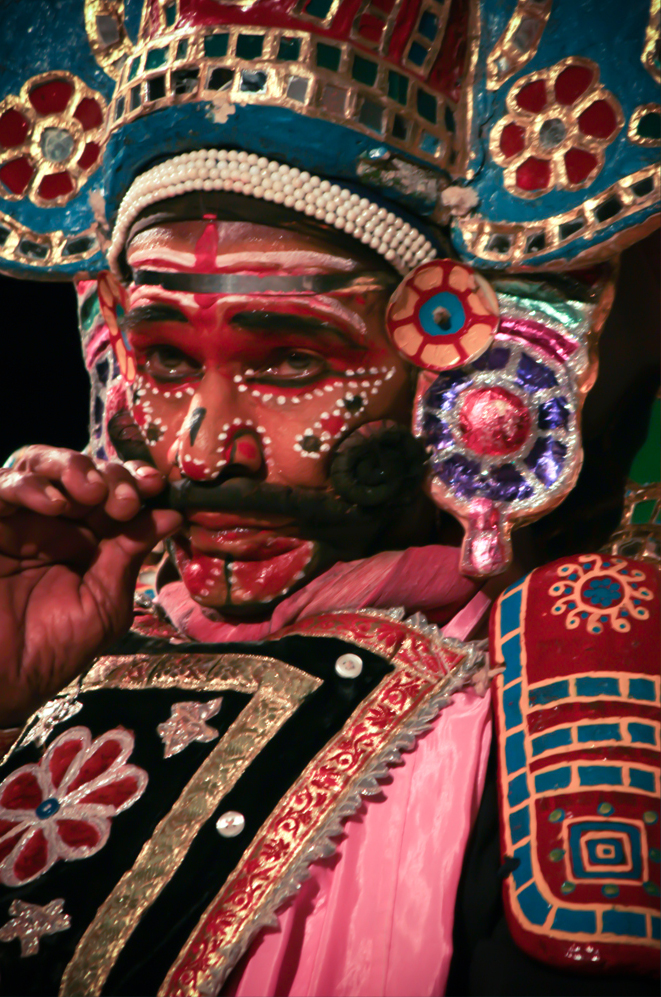
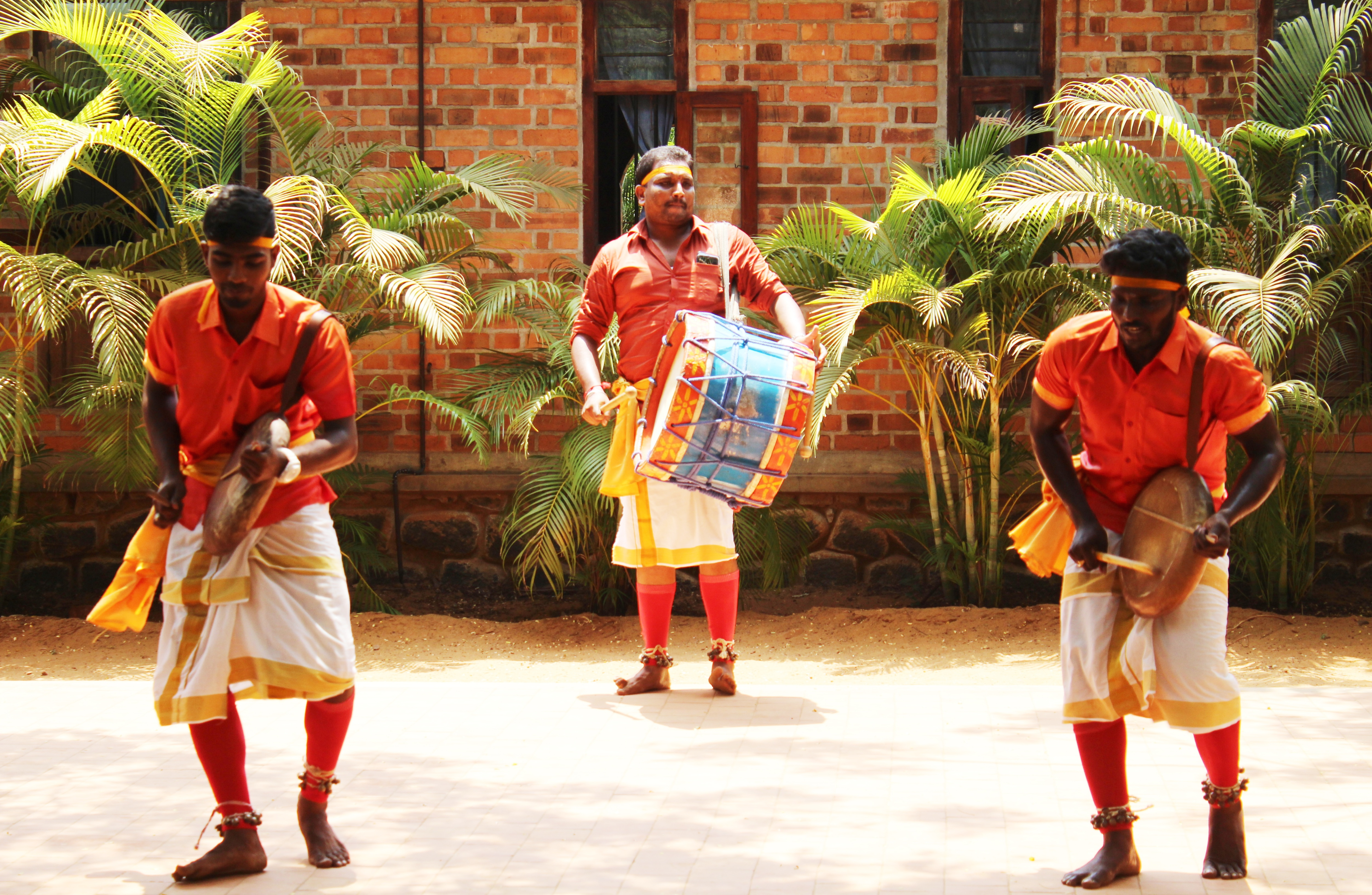
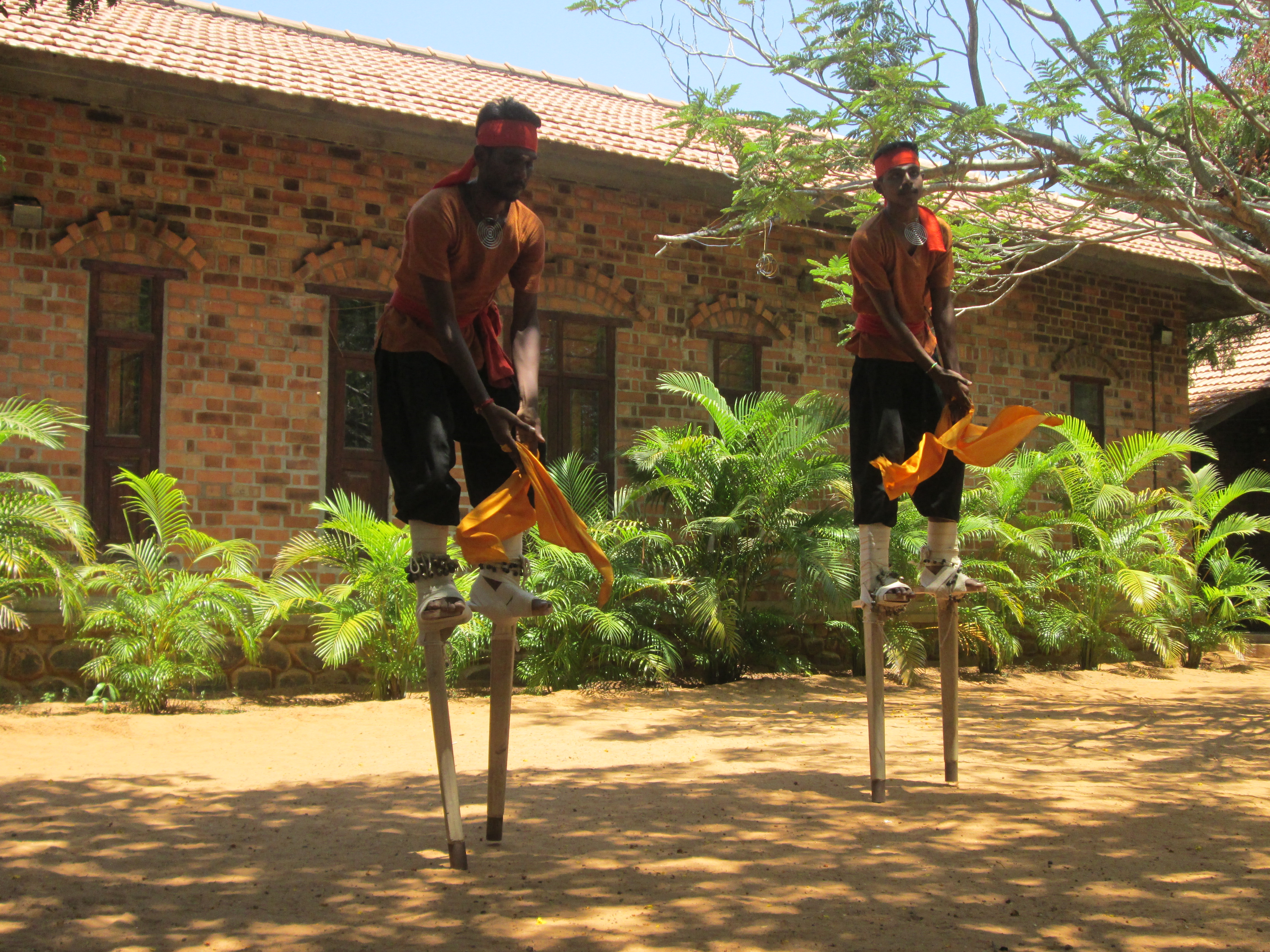
Various dance forms of Tamil Nadu; Top left to right: Bharatanatyam, Karagattam, Mayilattam, Poikkaal Kuthirai Aattam, Koothu, Parai Attam, and Kokkattam

Various dance forms are practiced in Tamil Nadu, the southernmost state of India. Tamil Nadu is the home of the Tamil people, who speak Tamil language, one of the oldest surviving languages in India. With archaeological evidence pointing to the Tamilakam region being inhabited for more than 3,800 years, Tamil culture has seen multiple influences over the years and has developed diversely. With its diverse culture, many forms of individual and group dances have their origins in the region.

As per Tamil literature, dance forms formed a part of nun kalaigal (fine art forms) which also included music, and drama. Bharatanatyam is a major genre of classical dance that originated in the state. There are a lot of folk dance forms that are practised in the region, some of which trace their origins to the Sangam period (3rd century BCE). Koothu was a popular theater art from which combined dance with drama.

== Background and history ==
While archeological evidence points to hominids inhabiting the Tamil Nadu region nearly 400 millennia ago, it has been inhabited by modern humans for at least 3,800 years. Tamilakam was the region consisting of the southern part of the Indian Subcontinent including the present day state of Tamil Nadu and was inhabited by the ancient Tamil people. The Tamils speak Tamil language, one of the oldest surviving languages in India. The region was ruled by various kingdoms over the years, major of which are the Sangam period (300 BC–AD 300) triumvirate of Cheras, Cholas, and Pandyas. The other major rules included the Pallavas (3rd–9th century), and the later Vijayanagaras (14th–17th century). and the later Vijayanagara Empire (14th–17th century CE). The region was under European colonization for two centuries until the Indian Independence in 1947. Hence, culture have seen multiple influences over the years and have developed diversely. In the Sangam period, the various art forms were classified into three types: iyal (poetry), isai (music) and nadakam (drama). In the later Tamil literature, the art forms were classified into two broad categories:nun kalaigal (fine art forms) which included dance, music, and drama and kavin kalaigal (beautiful art forms) which included others such as architecture, sculpture, painting and poetry. Many forms of individual and group dances have their origins in the region.

== Classical dance ==
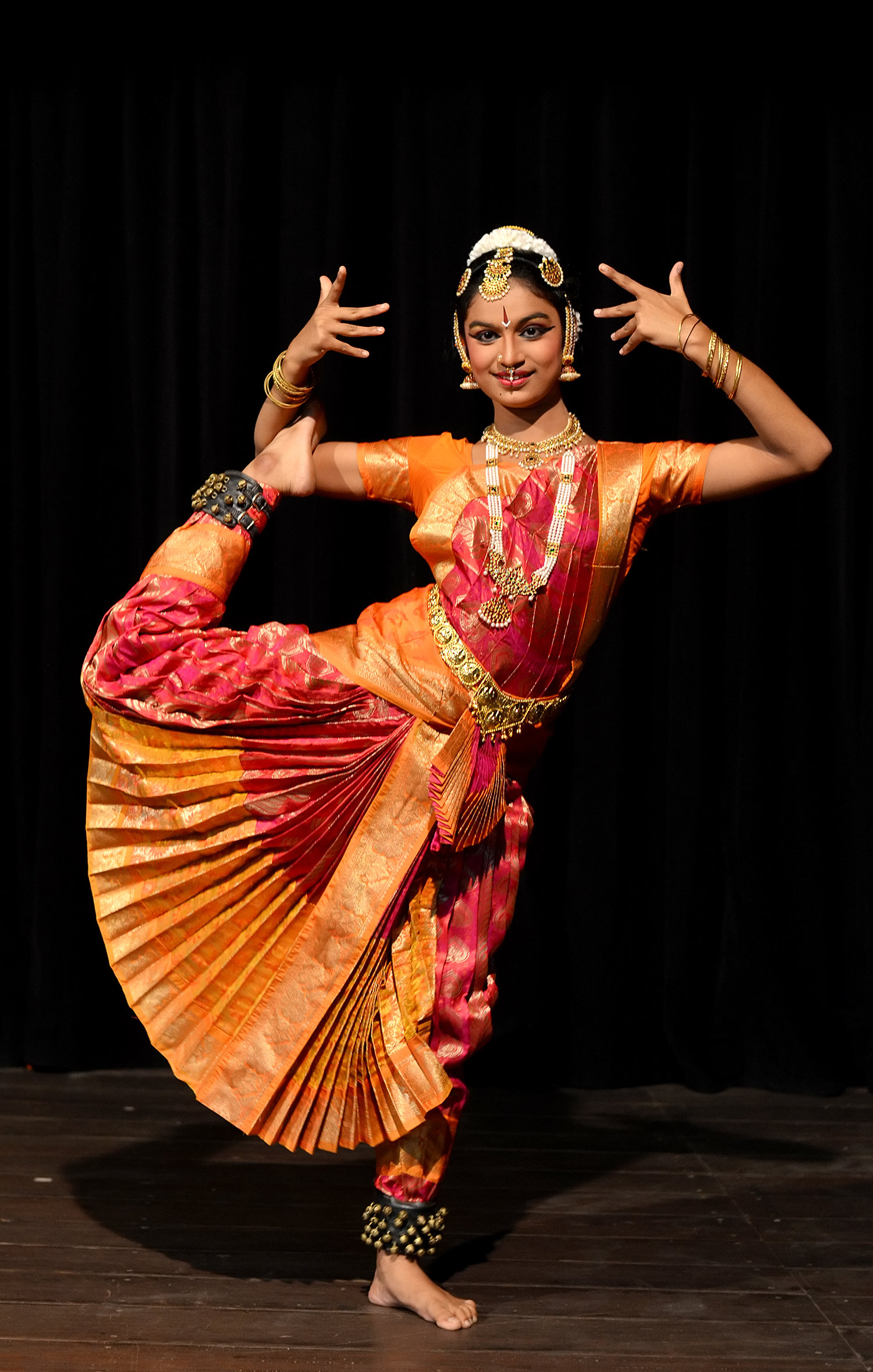
A solo Bharatanatyam performer

Bharatanatyam is a major genre of Indian classical dance that originated in Tamil Nadu. It is recognized by the Sangeet Natak Akademi as one of the oldest classical dance forms of India. The name is a portmanteau of the Tamil word Bharatam and Natyam, the Sanskrit word for dance. Bharatam is derived from the first letters of the Tamil words bhavam (feelings, emotions), ragam (melody, framework for musical notes), and talam (rhythm). A description of the dance is found in the 2nd century CE Sangam literature of Silappatikaram and temple sculptures dated to the early middle age (6th to 9th century CE) project the dance form. The theoretical foundations of the dance are found in the Tamil text Kootha Nool and in Natya Shastra, a Sanskrit text of performance arts. According to some Indologists, the origin of the dance is linked to the devadasi culture, which was prevalent in the Hindu temples.

Traditionally, Bharatanatyam was a solo dance performed exclusively by women. An individual dancer is known as ekaharya. The dancer was accompanied by musicians and one or more singers. Typically, a guru is present as the director and conductor of the performance. The accompanying music is in the Carnatic style of South India, as is the recitation and chanting. In modern adaptations of the dance, the dance troupes involve multiple dancers, who might play specific characters in a story or choreographed to perform in tandem. The repertoire of the dance has developed into nrita (pure dance), nritya (solo expressive dance) and natya (group dramatic dance).

The dance has traditionally been a form of an interpretive narration of mythical stories, religious and spiritual ideas from the Hindu texts. A traditional Bharatanatyam dance performance follows a seven to eight-part order of presentation called margams. The dancers are usually dressed in colorful silk saris with golden or silver zari embroidery on the borders, draped in a specific way and adorned with various jewelry. All dancers wear leather anklets made up of small bells on each foot called salangai. The dance is characterized by the fixed upper torso with bent legs or flexed out knees combined with various footwork and a number of gestures known as abhinaya, performed using various hand mudras, eye and facial expressions. An arangetram (literally "ascending the stage") is a solo debut performance that signifies the completion of initial formal training of a young dancer. This performance is typically done ten to twelve years after a dancer begins learning the dance.

== Folk dance ==
=== Kai silambattam ===
Silambu is a hollow anklet made up of a metal such as copper and filled with iron or silver beads that produce noise when the wearer moves or dances. It forms the basis of the Tamil Sangam literature Silappathikaram. It is generally worn by women on the leg and termed as kālchilambu in Tamil ("kal" meaning leg). In contrast, kāichilambu is held in the hand ("kai" meaning hand). For the dance, the dancers wear anklets and hold a silambu in their hands to make noises while dancing. The dance is performed in temples during Amman festivals or Navaratri festival especially to praise female deities like Durga or Kali.

=== Karakattam ===
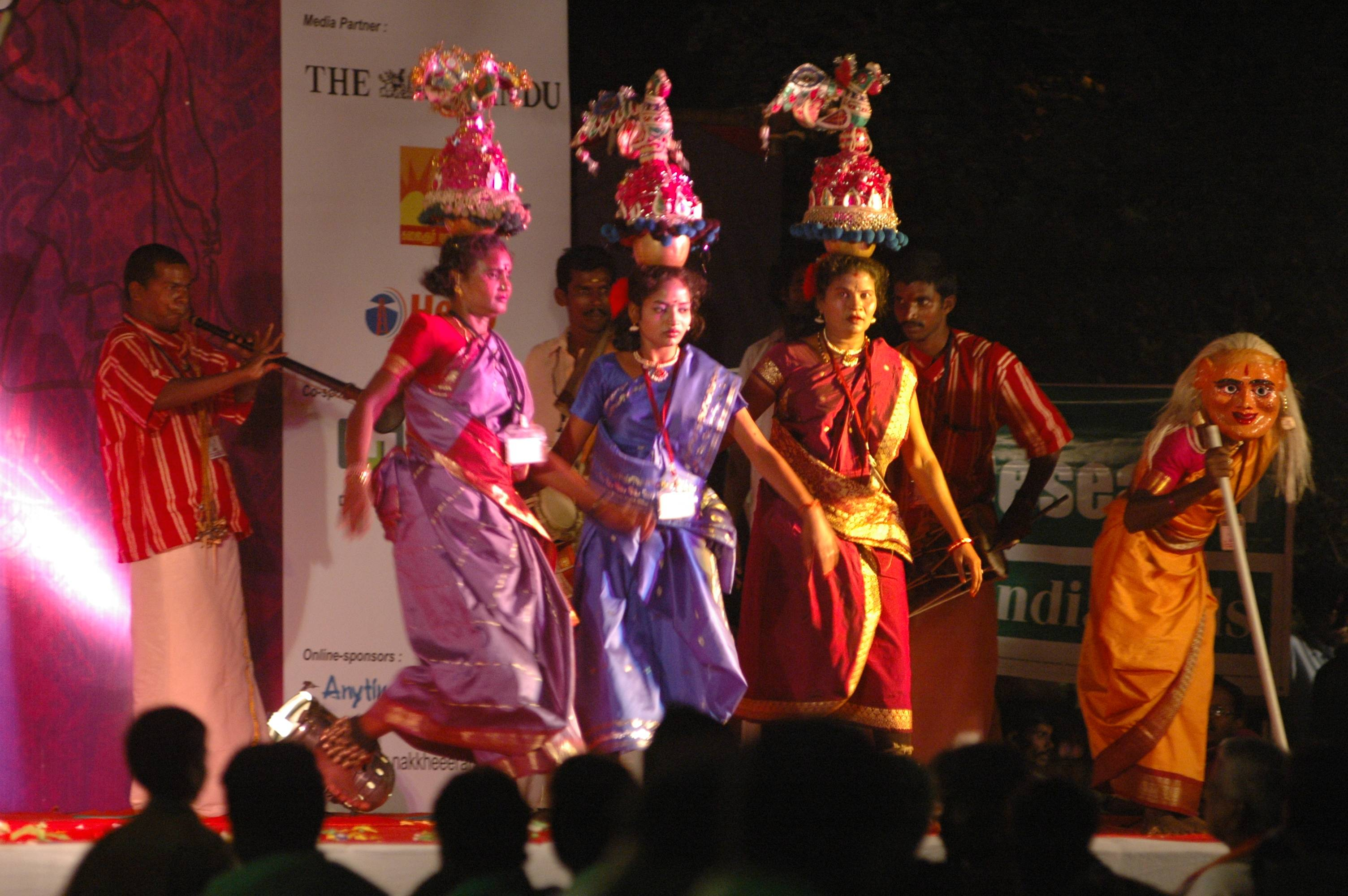
Karakattam performance

Karakattam is a folk dance which involves dancers balancing clay or metal pot(s) on the head while making movements with the body. The pots may be empty or sometimes filled with water and are decorated with colorful flowers and leaves mostly neem, which is of medicinal and religious importance to the Tamils. The performer may sometimes carry multiple pots layered on top of one another. This dance is usually associated with the worship of Amman and played in festivals and fairs. The art form was traditionally practiced by women, who wore saris. Men wearing make-up may join them sometimes as a part of the story line. In the 21st century, the dance has been subjected to significant changes. It has sometimes obtained a reputation for vulgarity with women wearing short skirts, showing of their midriff and bright make-up.

=== Kavadiattam ===
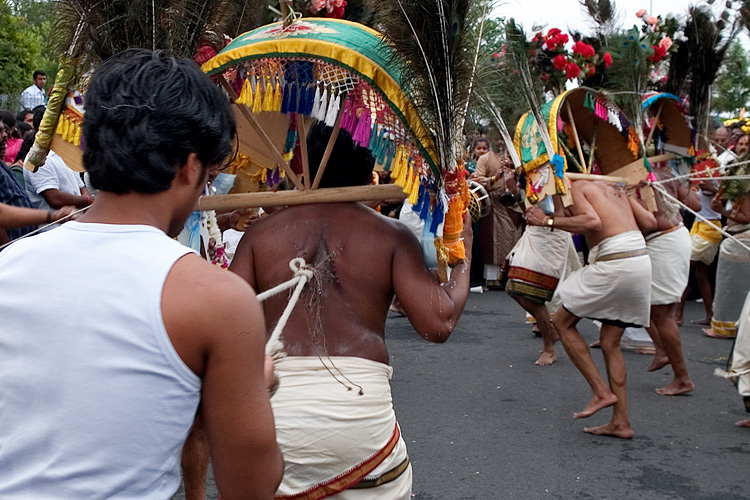
Kavadiattam

Kavadiattam is a often a ceremonial act of sacrifice and offering to Hindu gods especially Murugan. Kavadi (meaning "burden" in Tamil) itself is a physical burden. The practice emphasizes debt bondage and by bearing the kavadi, the dancer implores the gods for assistance usually on behalf of a loved one who is in need of healing, or as a means of balancing a spiritual debt. A simple kavadi is a wooden stick balanced on the shoulders with weights on both the ends, usually pots of cow milk known as pal kavadi. A traditional kavadi consists of two semicircular pieces of wood or steel which are bent and attached to a cross structure that can be balanced on the shoulders of the carrier and weigh upto 30 kg (66 lb). It is often decorated with flowers and peacock feathers as an act of reverence to Murugan, among other things.

The dancers may also do a form of mortification of the flesh by piercing the skin, tongue or cheeks with skewers. The dance is accompanied by drumming and chanting of verses help them enter a state of trance and Vibuthi, a type of holy ash is spread across the body. The dancers often prepare themselves by keeping clean, doing regular prayers, following a vegetarian diet and fasting while remaining celibate. They carry the kavadi and dance with bare feet usually en route to a pilgrimage.

=== Kolattam and kummi ===
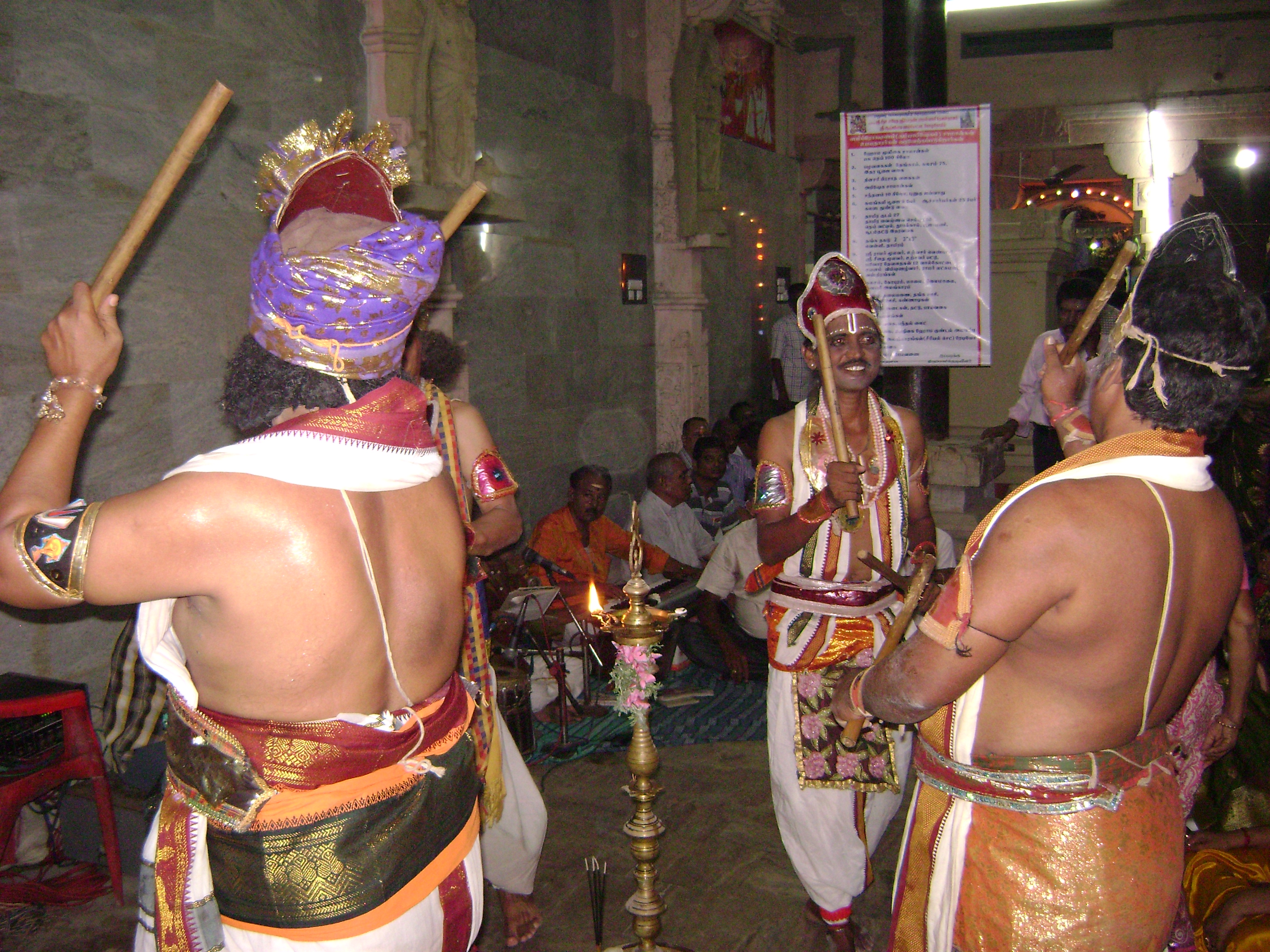
Kolattam

Kolattam is an ancient folk dance usually performed by women with Kol meaning "stick" in Tamil. The dance uses two small sticks, one in each hand. The dancers generally stand in a circular formation and beat the sticks to make specific rhythms while singing songs. The dancers may beat the sticks in their own hands or with the sticks held by other dancers. The dancers may form multiple circles with dancers changing pairs with the members of adjacent circles to make the beats. The dance is usually dedicated to gods or goddesses. The dance is performed during the harvest season and for a fortnight in the Karthigai month of Tamil calendar. There are different variants such as pinnal kolattam and chakke kolattam. Pinnal kolattam uses ropes instead of sticks. Kummiattam is a folk dance similar to Kolattam, with the difference being that hands are used to make sounds while dancing in kummiattam instead of sticks used in the later. The dancers form a rhythm by clapping the hands in different postures. The dance is performed during religious ceremonies, functions and festivals such as Pongal, generally by women. There are various types of the dance depending on the occasion or objects used such as poonthotti kummi, deepa kummi, kadir kummi and mulaipuri kummi.

=== Kuthu ===
Dappankuthu or kuthu is typically danced to the gaana music genre or beats from a percussion instrument such as parai. It is relatively informal in that it has no structured steps and formal framework. It is one of several popular genres employed in Tamil cinema.

=== Mayilattam ===
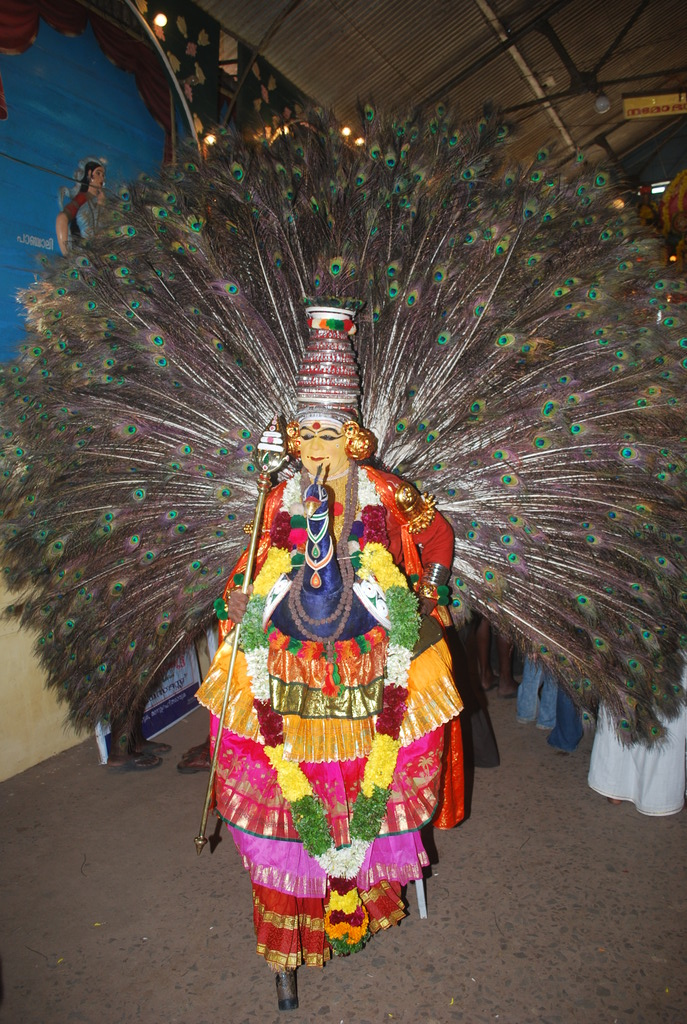
Mayilattam

Mayilattam literally translates to "peacock dance". The dancers dress themselves using peacock feathers, glittering head-dresses and beak like attachments. The performers usually seat themselves upon a wooden peacock replica and perform to various folk songs and tunes. The peacock symbolizes the vahana or mount of the deity Murugan, who rides a peacock known as Paravani. The dance is usually dedicated to god Murugan and performed in Murugan temples as a tradition during festivals. The dancers often stand on tall wooden pieces and the beaks can be opened. The dancers make movements emulating a peacock and operate the feathers similar to the bird using a thread or rope.

There are other similar dances where the dancers dress up in animal costumes including Kaalaiattam where dancers dress up like a bull and Karadiattam where dancers dress up like a bear.

=== Oyilattam ===
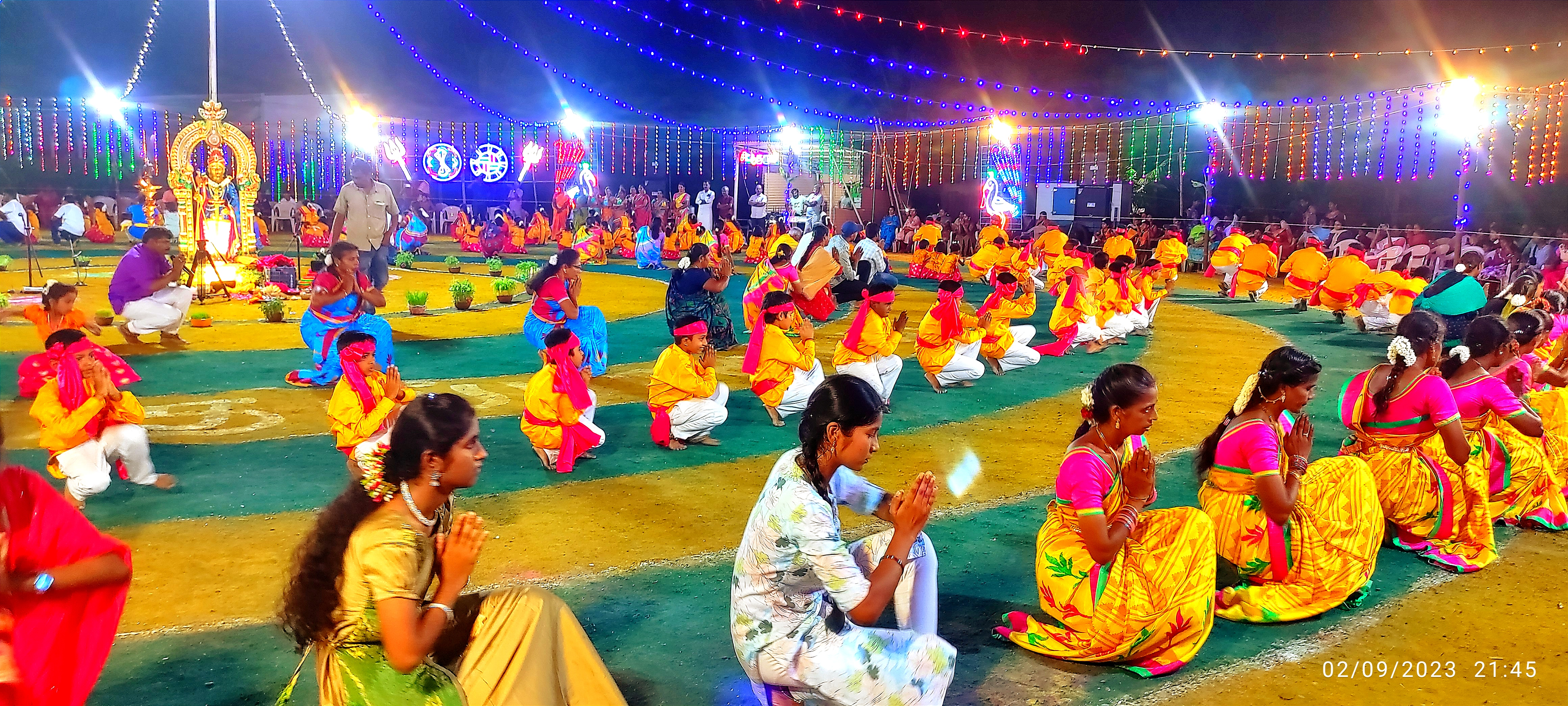
Oyilattam

Oyilattam literally means "dance of beauty". It is a folk dance with origins from southern Tamil Nadu and practiced in southern and Kongu Nadu regions. It was traditionally a war dance where few men wearing ankle bells would stand in a line with pieces of colored cloth and perform rhythmic steps to the accompanying music. The dance is often performed to narrate the story of Murugan. In the recent years, women have also started performing the dance. Oyil Kummi is a fusion of oyilattam with kummi.

=== Paampattam ===
Paampattam (literally meaning "snake dance") is performed by young girls, who wear specifically designed costumes emulating a snake skin. Snakes are worshiped in many parts of the state and the dance is considered a tribute to the same. The dancers often lie-down on their back and move along the ground, writhing, creeping and making quick biting movements, trying to emulate the movements of a snake and also use their hands to mimic the hood of a cobra snake and intimidate the viewers.

=== Paraiattam ===
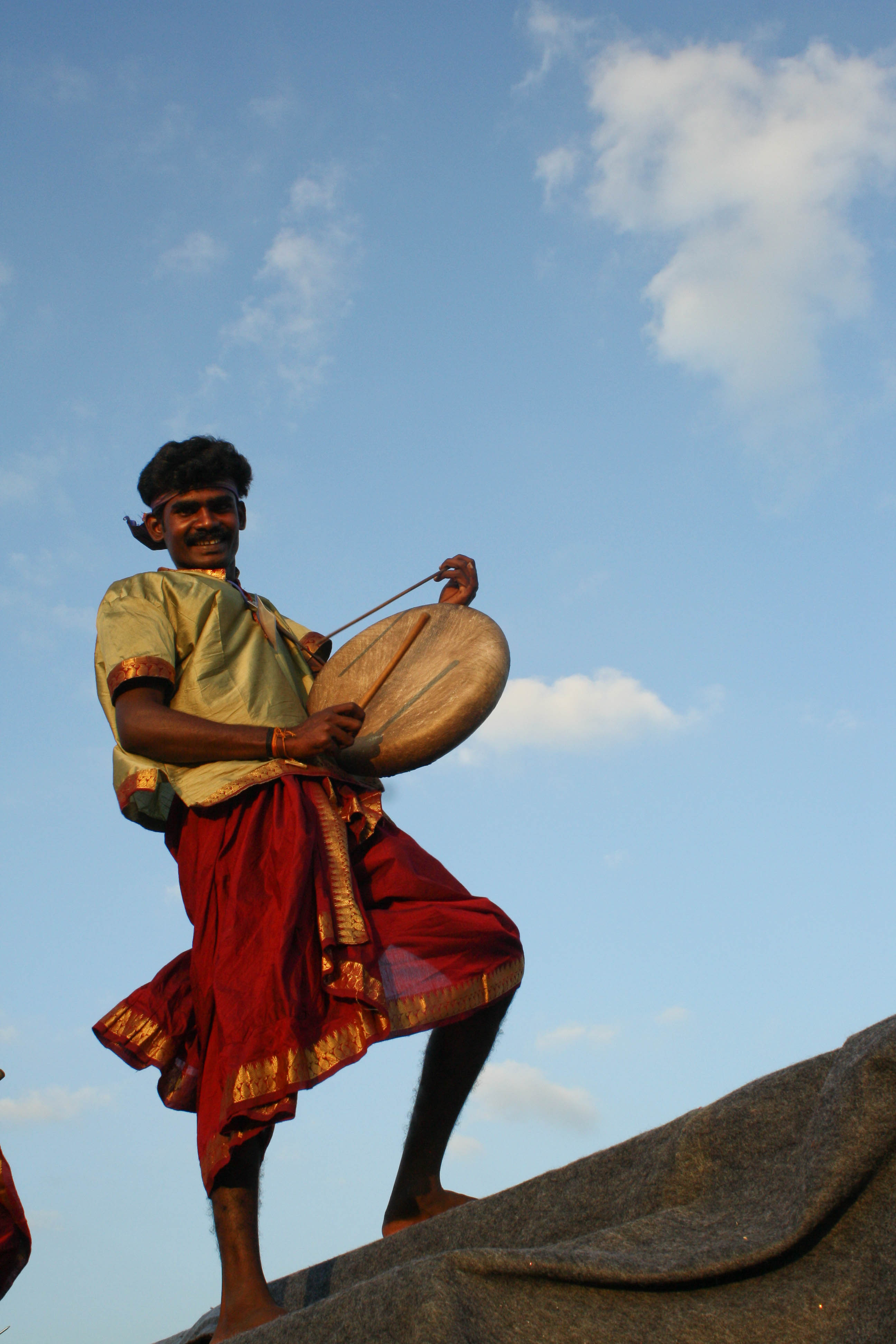
Paraiattam

Paraiattam is a traditional dance that involves dancing while playing the parai, an ancient percussion instrument. The instrument was one of the ancient native music instruments developed and used by the Tamil people as mentioned in literature such as Kuṟuntokai and Tirumurai. The player of the instrument is also the dancer. The parai is hung vertically by a cloth strap called nadai over one of the shoulders and is held between the other hand and the performer's body. Two wooden sticks are used for beating the drum, one longer made of bamboo, called as sundu Kuchi and another shorter, thicker stick of any wood, called as adi Kucchi to produce different beats while dancing.

According to Hindu mythology and folk stories, it is believed that the notes for the dance originated from gods Shiva and Parvati. It is used in the worship of traditional Tamil deities like Muneeswarar. The dance was earlier performed during festivals and in auspicious occasions. The dance might be accompanied by other instruments such as Tharai in Tamil festivals and folk arts. In the last century, the dance has become increasingly associated with funerals rather than auspicious occasions and confined to Dalit communities. Thappattam was a different tribal dance played along with a similar percussion instrument called thappu. Since the later middle ages, thappattam and pariattam were started to be used interchangeably.

=== Puliyattam ===
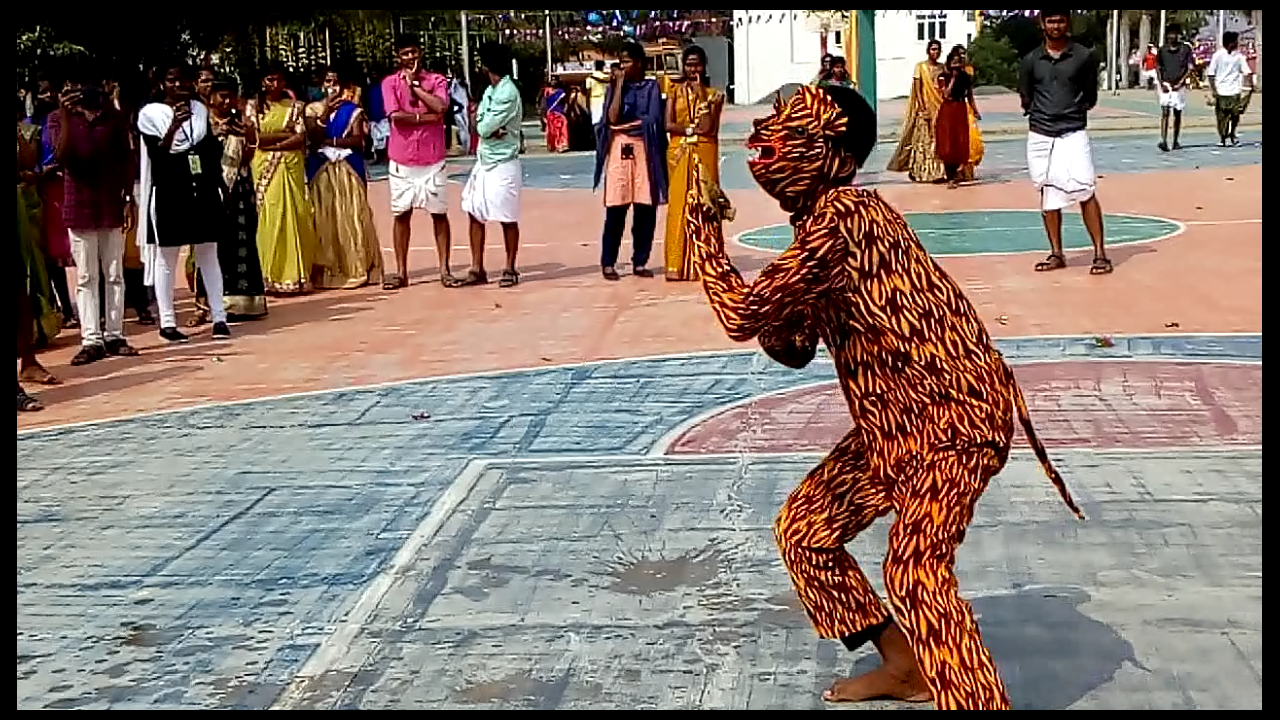
Puliyattam

Puliyattam is a folk dance usually performed by males in which the dancers paint themselves in yellow and black using limonite and charcoal respectively to resemble a tiger's stripes. They also wear masks, fuzzy ears, paws, fangs and a tail to try and imitate a tiger. The dancers then try to imitate a tiger's movements such as a tiger stalking a prey. Sometimes, the dance is performed as a group with each dancer competing with the other to show off as to who imitates the tiger to the best. The dancers keep lemon wedges between the lips, so that the mouth does not dry while making purring noises imitating a tiger. The dance is usually performed during Navrathri and other temple festivals.

=== Puraviattam ===
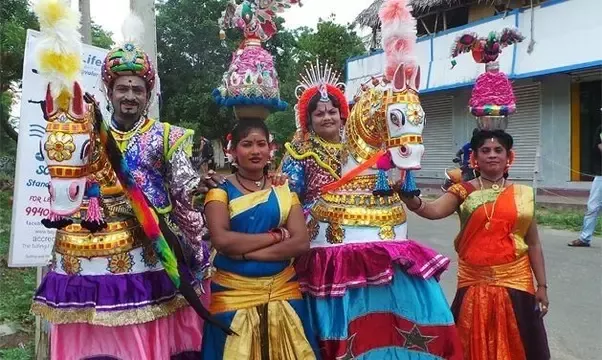
Poikkaal Kuthirai Aattam performers

Poikkaal Kuthirai literally means "false foot horse" in Tamil and the dance involves the usage of a dummy horse. The dancers get into a wooden frame designed like the body of a horse along the hips. The dummy horse is made of jute, cardboard or paper and richly decorated with glass pieces. The dance is performed by both men and women and the dancer enacts movements as if riding on a horse back. The art was popularized in the early Chola period and finds mention in the Tamil literature Silappadikaram as "marakkal attam", a dance with wooden legs. Wooden legs are used by the performers to look taller like a horse and sound like the hooves of a horse. The dancers may sometimes brandish a sword or a whip and the dance is accompanied by folk music.

=== Others ===
Bhagavatha nadanam is a dance form that narrates the life and stories of the various avatars of Hindu god Vishnu. It is usually performed during Navrathri or Vaishnavite festivals like Gokulashtami. Sevaiattam is another dance form devoted to Vishnu. Historically, the dance was performed by the nataka community at the rear of chariot processions. Urumiattam (also called as Urumi komaliattam) is a dance from accompanied by the playing of urumi, a two-faced drum. It is a temple art practiced in few regions of the state and usually performed in Amman temples during the month of Adi.

Chakkaiaattam is a form of folk dance practiced majorly in south central parts of the state. It is a social dance performed by a group of men or women with no specific theme and may be accompanied by music and songs. It is performed usually as an invocation to Tamil gods such as Murugan or Mariamman. The dancers hold wooden sticks measuring about 7 in (180 mm) long by a thread held between the fingers, which are used to produce different sounds.

Deverattam means "Dance of the Gods" in Tamil. The act is performed generally by males who wear costumes, make-up and may wear different face masks suiting the theme enacted. Even female characters are played by males. It is an abstract dance form with no sounds used and the dancers use various expressions to express various themes, that is derived from the aspects of nature, animals and birds. It is performed at weddings, festivals and ritual occasions.

Kuravanji attam is a dance form that originated from the Kuravar people. The dance is performed by six to eight women who dance to different tunes in the form of a folk ballet. It originated as a form of Shaivism, dancing as a tribute to god Shiva though Kuravanjis for Vishnu also exist. The earliest known kuravanji is the Thirukutrala kuravanji, dated to 1600-1700 CE. The dance has become a blend of classic and folk dances performed by Devadasis in temples. In the recent years, Kuravanji dancers are men who dress up as women, often as consorts of Shiva or Vishnu and try to out dance each other.

== Martial dance ==
Silambattam is a martial dance using a silambam. There are mentions of the art form in Tamil Sangam literature. Silambam is a long staff of about 168 cm (66 in) in length, often made of wood such as bamboo. It was used for self-defense and to ward off animals and later evolved into a martial art and dance form.

== Puppetry ==
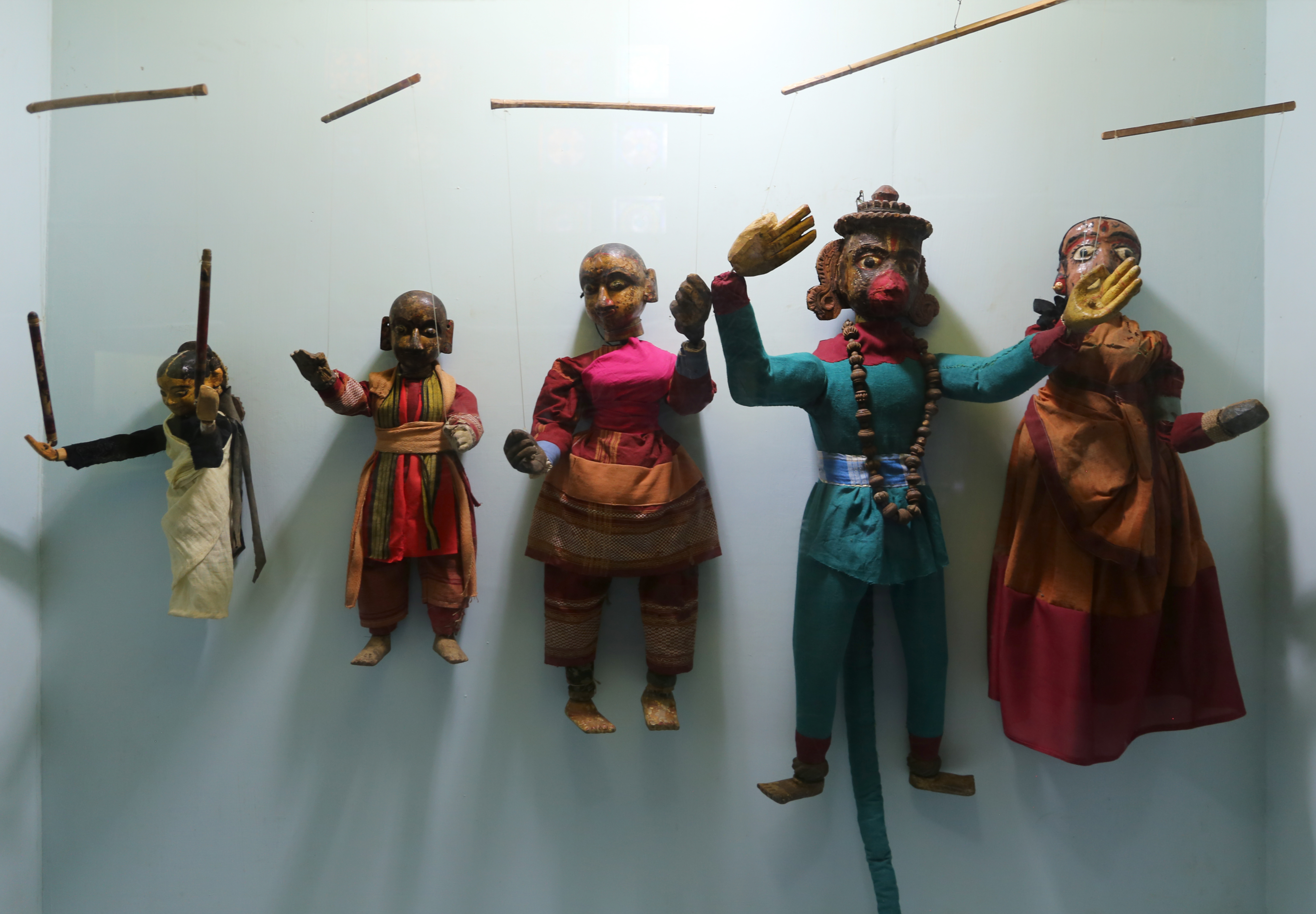
Doll marionettes used in Bommalattam

Bommalattam is a type of puppetry using inanimate objects that originated in the region. While the timeline of the origin of the art form is uncertain, it has existed for many centuries. It uses various doll marionettes which are 1–3 ft (0.30–0.91 m) tall and may weigh up to 10 kg (22 lb). The puppets are manipulated by rods and strings attached to their heads, back, arms and legs. The puppets are made of lightweight wood and are dressed in crafted costumes bulked up by paper stuffings to give a more rounded appearance. The puppets are crafted with prominent jewellery so that the edges are visible in the shadows.

Puppeteers occupy a 11 ft (3.4 m) wide area situated 4 ft (1.2 m) above the ground. They operate the puppets by using movements from hands and arms to control devices the rods or strings. The puppet staging area is created by placing a vertical white screen placed on a black cloth covered bench. The puppets are operated behind the screen which is illuminated by a lantern or several oil lamps. The audience are seated in front of the screen with only the screen separating them from the performers. The audience are able to view the shadows of the puppets operated by the puppeteers.

The puppeteers wear bells which are sounded along with the puppet movements. Background music is also played by using traditional instruments such as cymbals, harmonium and mridangam. The puppeteer usually engages in narration of the stories while operating the puppets. The themes for the stories are drawn from various Hindu scriptures and local folklore. The puppet shows are often held during festivals or fairs and as a part of rituals to ward of evil forces, prevent epidemics, invoke rains to end drought. The art form is usually practised as a family tradition with all members of the family engaged in making the puppets, maintaining them and performing. Pava Koothu is a variation of puppetry which uses handheld glove puppets instead of doll marionettes.

== Theater ==
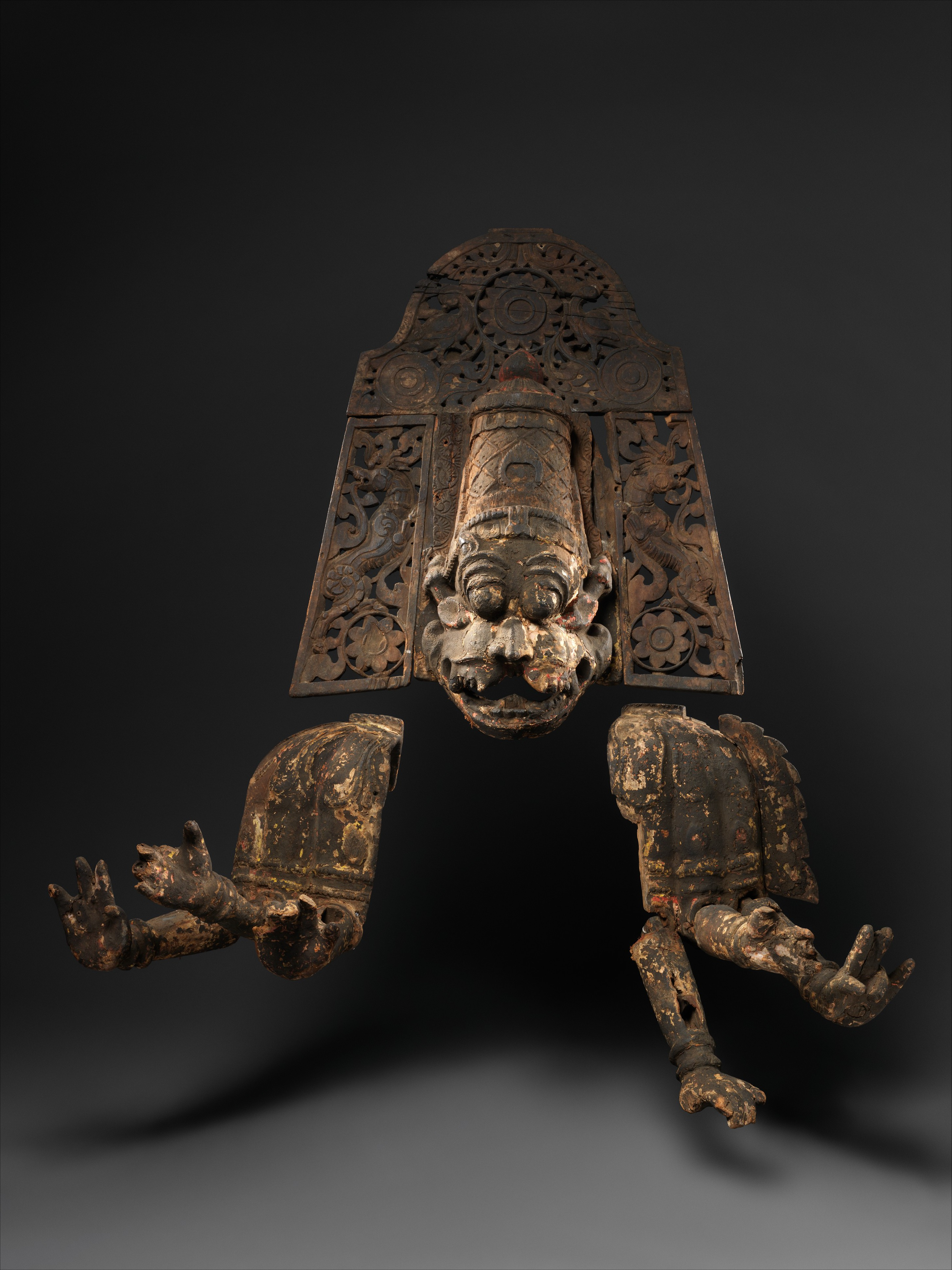
Koothu performer's attire, c. 1700–1750

Koothu refers to a play performance which consists of dance along with music, narration and singing. It originated from the early Tamilakam and consists of the art forms of Terukuttu and Kattaikkuttu. While the terms are used interchangeably in modern times, Terukkuttu referred to mobile performances in a procession, while Kattaikkuttu denoted narrative performances on a fixed performance space. The performers are usually males, who wear elaborate wooden headgear, special costumes with swirling skirts, ornaments such as heavy anklets along with prominent face painting and make-up. The art is a form of street theater, performed during festivals in open public places such as temples or village squares. It is usually dedicated to Hindu goddesses such as Mariamman or Draupadi. The stories are drawn from Hindu epics such as Ramayana and Mahabharata, mythology and folklore. The dance is accompanied by music played from traditional instruments and the story is usually narrated by a kattiyakaran in the background during the performance.

Koothu generally means a performance and is used as a part of the names denoting other specific art forms such as Ottan koothu, a tribal dance form. It originated from a tribal group called Otta and the ritual dance is performed by both men and women in a small group. It is performed during festive occasions and depict episodes from Hindu epics and other folk stories. Nondi natakam is another form of theater from the seventeenth century in which the performer usually dances on a single leg and plays are performed with simple narration and music.

== See also ==
- History of Tamil Nadu
- Ancient Tamil music
- Indian martial arts
- Villu Paatu
