= Urumi (drum) =

Double-headed drum used in South India

Urumee
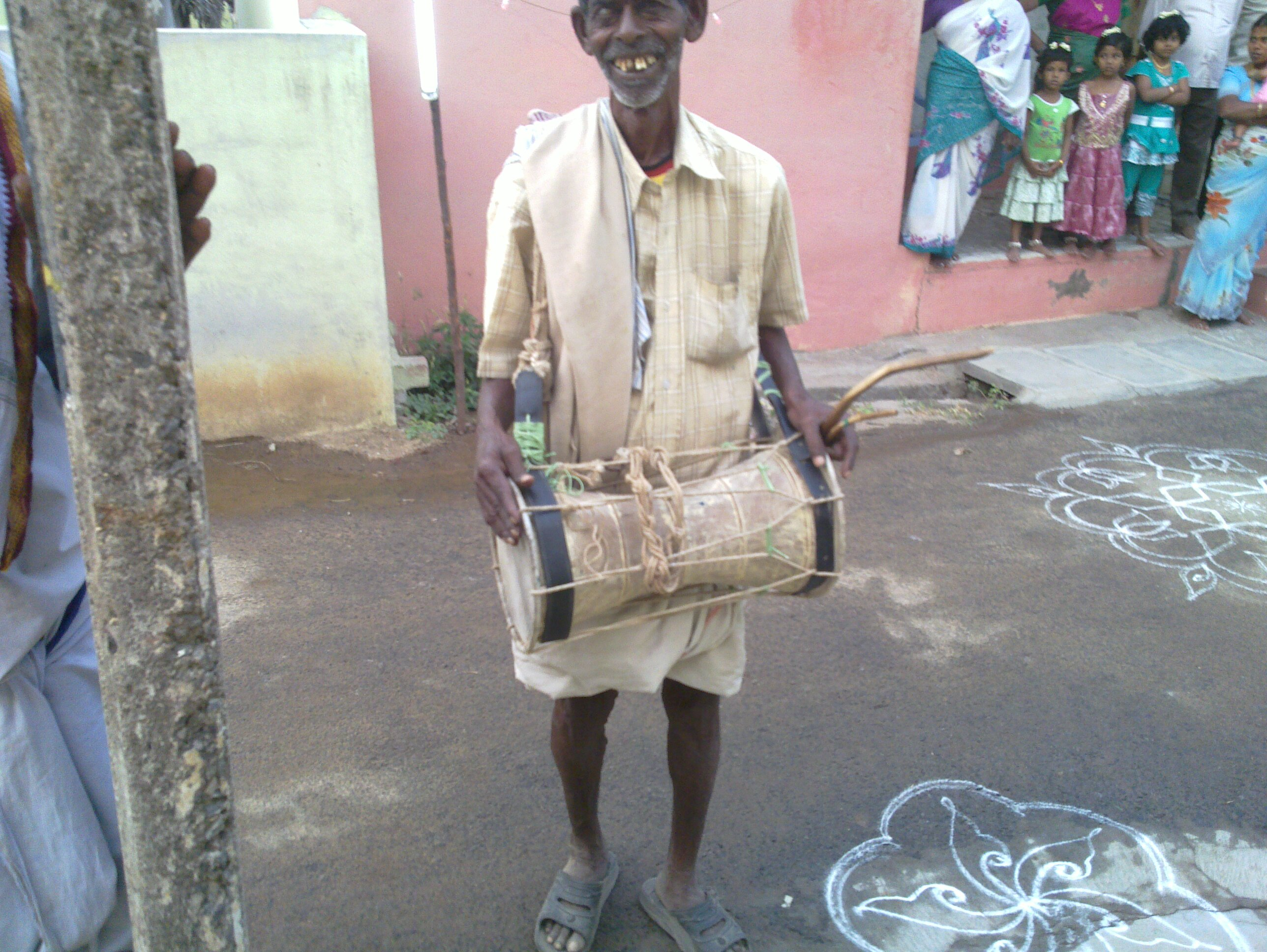
- Other names: Urumi melam
- Classification: Percussion instrument, goatskin heads

Playing range
- Bolt tuned or rope tuned with dowels and hammer

Related instruments
- [urumi melam

The urumi (Tamil: உறுமி மேளம், Uṟumi Mēḷam; also known as urumee) is a double-headed hourglass drum from the state of Tamil Nadu, South India. Two skin heads are attached to a single hollow, often intricately carved wooden shell. The preferred wood is jackwood, although other woods like rosewood may be used. Both left and right heads are usually made from cow hide that is stretched around a thin metal ring (sometimes lizard skin is used for the right head). The outer circumference of each head is perforated with approximately seven to eight holes. The two heads are held in tension by a continuous rope that is woven around the drum in a V-shape pattern. Additional small coils of string or metal are tied around each pair of ropes near the left head. These coils can be slide horizontally along the length of the drum, increasing or decreasing the tension between the heads as necessary. For example, during the monsoon season the drum heads will slacken so much that the instrument becomes unplayable. Using these coils drummers can easily rectify such problems.

== Technique ==
The urumi is slung with a cloth strap across the shoulder and played by the drummer horizontally. This simple harness allows the drummer to play standing or walking. The urumi is played entirely with sticks. There are five basic sounds that can be played on the drum: an "open sound" produced by striking the right head, a deep resonant "moaning" sound produced by striking the right head while simultaneously rubbing the left head with the edge of a long curved stick, a bent "talking drum-like" tone in which the right head is stuck while the left hand squeezes and releases the rope holding the heads together, and two closed (non-pitched) sounds produced by striking and pressing/muting with the left and right stick respectively. Castor oil is often applied to the left head in order to facilitate the drummer's ability to produce the "moaning sound" described above.

== Notation ==
As an oral tradition, Tamil folk music does not have a codified system of written notation. Musicians learn through years of unconscious absorption, conscious listening, imitation, and practice.

== History and performance context ==
This drum is widely believed to possess supernatural and sacred powers. When played in religious ceremonies and processions, the performance of specific beats on the urumi may induce spirit possessions or Trance. The urumi is also played in the South Indian state of Kerala, which borders Tamil Nadu. The urumi is most often performed in two types of ensembles:

- Urumi Melam
- Naiyandi Melam

Urumi melam ensembles usually consists of double-reed instruments Nadaswaram, a pair of double headed drums called pambai, and one to three urumi drums; this particular ensemble is associated exclusively with funerals and other inauspicious occasions. The naiyandi melam is the most common type of folk ensemble associated with ritual and dance. A typical naiyandi melam is composed of two double-reed nadaswaram, one or two thavil (barrel drums), a thamukku (kettle drum played with leather straps), a pambai, and an urumi. In the popular dance known as Devarattam (dance), usually 2 to 3 urumis will be played with specific beats; sometimes a thappu (parai) is played in the background to keep a tempo. It performs for a number of festive occasions including dance-dramas, menstruation ceremonies, weddings, harvest festivals, and staged folk dances such as:

- Deverattam - Performed by the Rajakambalathu Nayakkar community
- Poikkal Kudirai (dummy horse dance)
- Mayil Attam (peacock dance)
- Puli Attam (tiger dance)
- Kavadi Attam (a devotional dance to Lord Murugan)

and many others. The urumi may also be heard on commercial recordings of film soundtracks and popular folk music.

== See also ==
- Damaru
- Hourglass drum
- Kaval Deivam
- Madurai Veeran
- Music of Tamil Nadu
- Parai
- Sangilikaruppan
- Udukai
