= Parai =

Traditional Indian drum

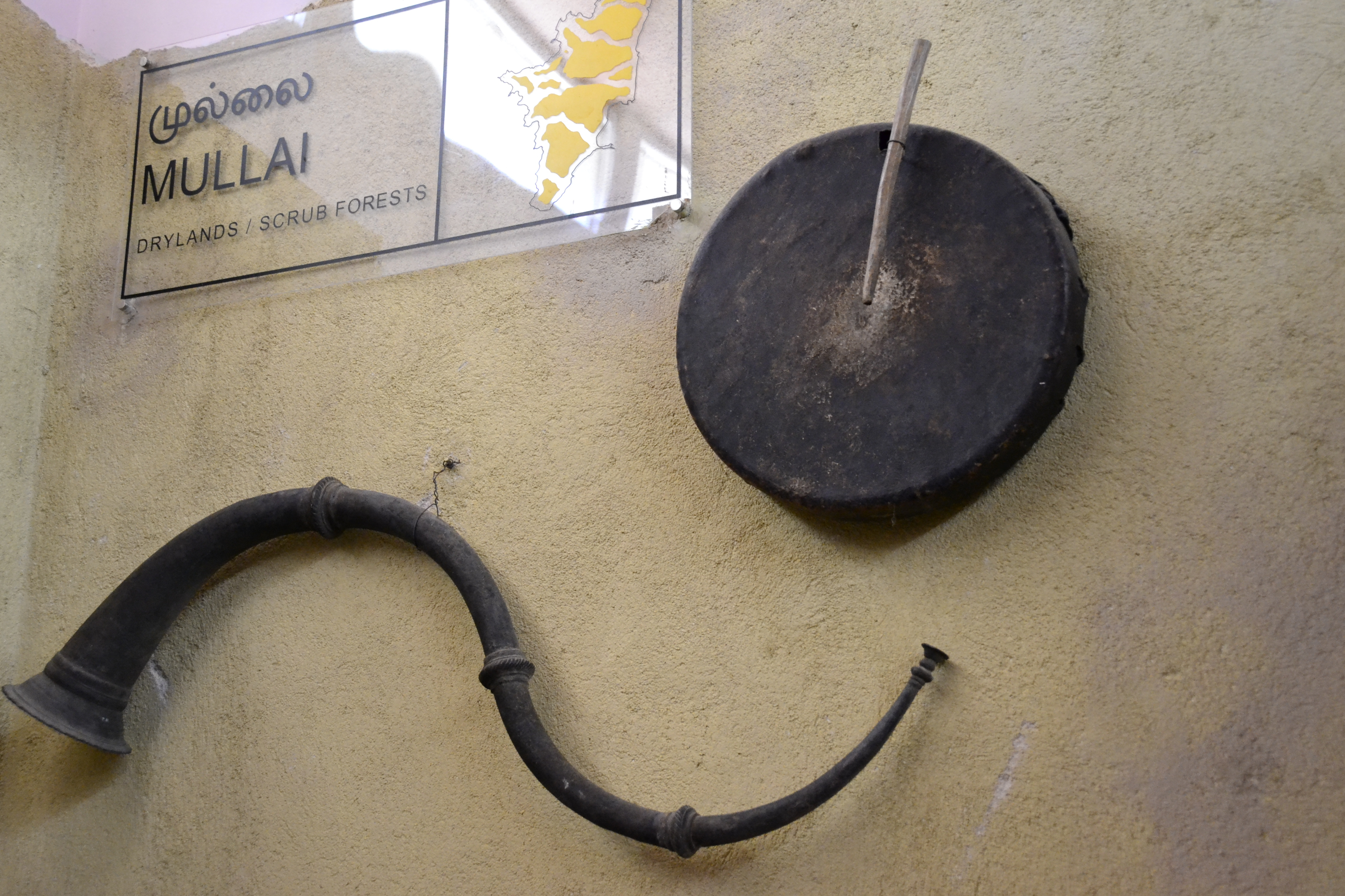
- A traditional Parai (along with Tharai)
- Other names: Thappattai
- Classification: Percussion instruments

Parai also known as Thappattai or Thappu is a traditional percussion instrument from South India, used to make announcements and played during festivals, folk dances, weddings and functions. It is played predominantly by the Tamils in Tamil Nadu, and in other regions with significant Tamil diaspora such as Sri Lanka. Although there are many variants of the instrument, it generally consists of a drum made of wood, open on one side and closed with a stretched animal hide on the other side along with two wooden sticks used for beating the drum.

The instrument finds mention in the Sangam literature and has been used by the ancient Tamil people. It is used as a part of parai attam, a traditional dance form. While thappu was a similar instrument used by tribal people, with minor variations, the names were used interchangeably since the late Middle Ages. It might be played along with tharai, a woodwind instrument, in folk dances and festivities or accompanied by other traditional instruments in rituals and functions.

== History ==
In Tamil, the word parai means "to speak" or "to tell". The exact origin of the instrument is not clear. The instrument was one of the ancient native music instruments developed and used by the Tamil people. Parai is mentioned in Sangam literature and was used to make announcements, with the announcers termed as Paraiyar. Kuṟuntokai from the Sangam period mentions the usage of the parai instrument in auspicious occasions. The Tirumurai, a twelve-volume compendium of hymns dated from 6th to the 11th century CE, mentions the instrument.

Parai attam is the dance form associated with the instrument and according to Hindu mythology and folk stories, it is believed that the notes for the dance originated from gods Shiva and Parvati. Thappu was a similar instrument which was used by tribals and in traditional Tamil dance forms but as parai was similar and also used to announce deaths and played in funerals, it was also called as thappu (meaning "inauspicious or wrong" in Tamil) probably during the Nayak period in the 16th century CE.

== Construct and variations ==
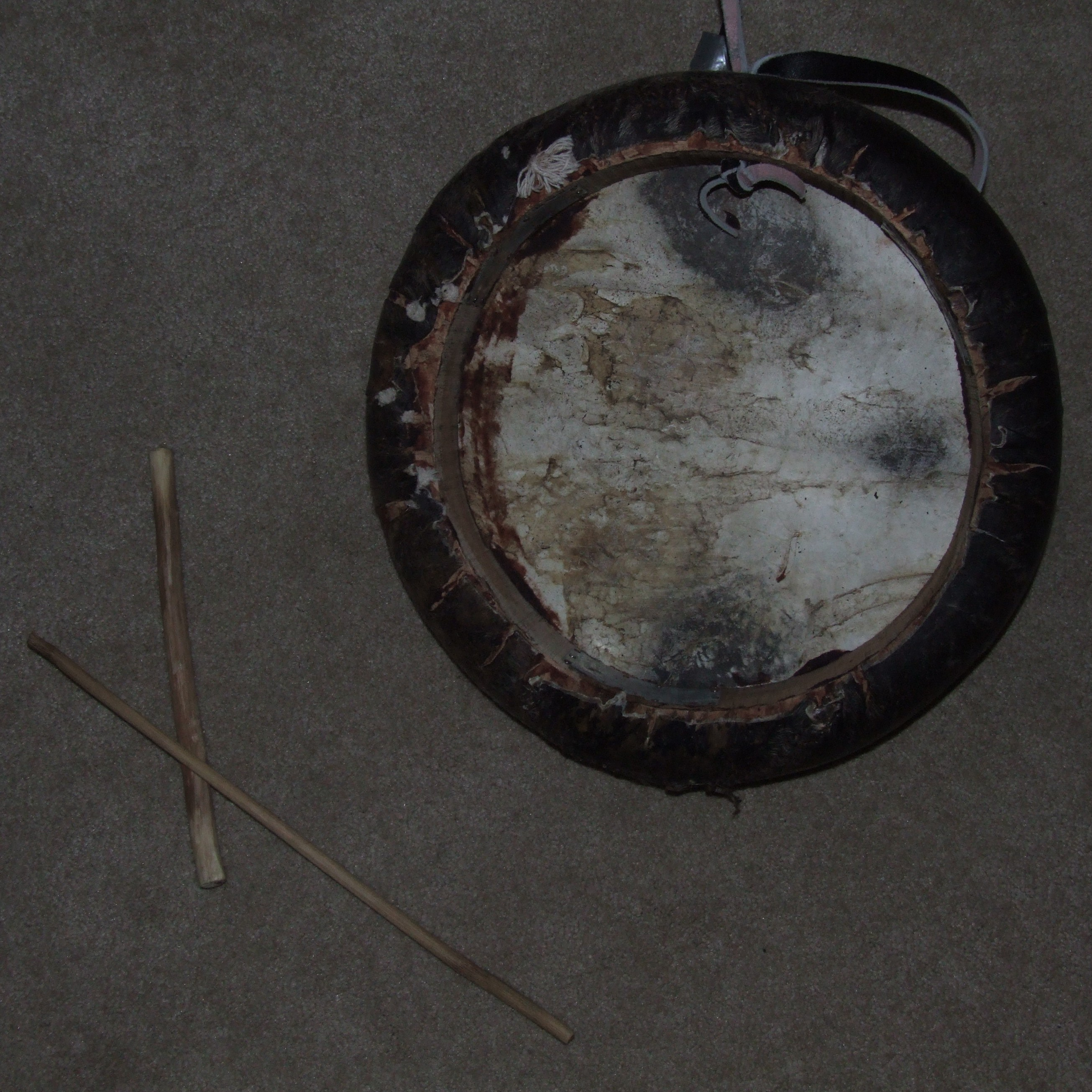
Underside of a parai, sticks on left

It consists of a shallow circular ring made of wood of diameter 16–22 in (410–560 mm), made from hardwood such as from the jack fruit tree. It is open on one side and covered on the other by an animal hide stretched over a wooden or metal ring, tightened to the wooden frame. Earlier, hemp or jute was used to tie the skin to the ends but nowadays leather straps and ropes are used with glues and nails. Two wooden sticks are used for beating the drum. One of the sticks is longer and made of bamboo, called as Sundu Kuchi and another is a short, thick stick of any wood, called as Adi Kucchi. The parai can be of various sizes and weights, often customized to the player and it may weigh from 1–5 kg (2.2–11.0 lb) with an average of around 3 kg (6.6 lb). The instrument is called by various other names including murasu, kudamula and panchamukha vadhyam.

Thappu was a similar percussion instrument with a smaller sized drum, used originally used by the tribal people for chasing away wild animals. Thappu was also traditionally used along with Puliyattam, a traditional dance form in which men wearing a tiger masks dance to the drum beats. Thappu was made from a water buffalo hide stretched over a wooden frame. There are two sticks similar to parai with one long, slender stick made of a specific type of bamboo (kalmungil) and another short, stubby stick made of purasu wood. Parai was a drum that dates back to Sangam period and was in use for much longer. In the later middle ages, the parai was also came to be known as Thappu and the words were started to be used interchangeably.

There are also variations across regions and depending on usage. There is a larger version called Periya Parai or Perum Parai (Periya or Perum meaning "large" in Tamil), which is a fat, stockier double-sided drum, similar to a Dhol or Dholak. This is a larger drum made of hollowed wood, about 30–40 in (760–1,020 mm) in length with a diameter of 10–20 in (250–510 mm) with a stretched goat skin used to close the sides. Two sticks made of peepul tree or bamboo are used to beat the drum. A variation of the equipment called Kinai Parai, essentially a larger drum hung from tree tops that would be played to announce an incoming battle or war. The parai used in Sri Lanka is a double-sided drum compared to a skinnier one-sided drum used in Tamil Nadu. The Parai similar to the one used in Tamil Nadu is known by the name of Thappu in Sri Lanka. Based on usage, Ariparai (Ari meaning bird in Tamil) was used to alert the birds nesting in the fields to fly to safety before harvesting. Meenkotparai (Meen meaning fish in Tamil) was a variant used by the coastal people for selling their catch.

== Technique ==
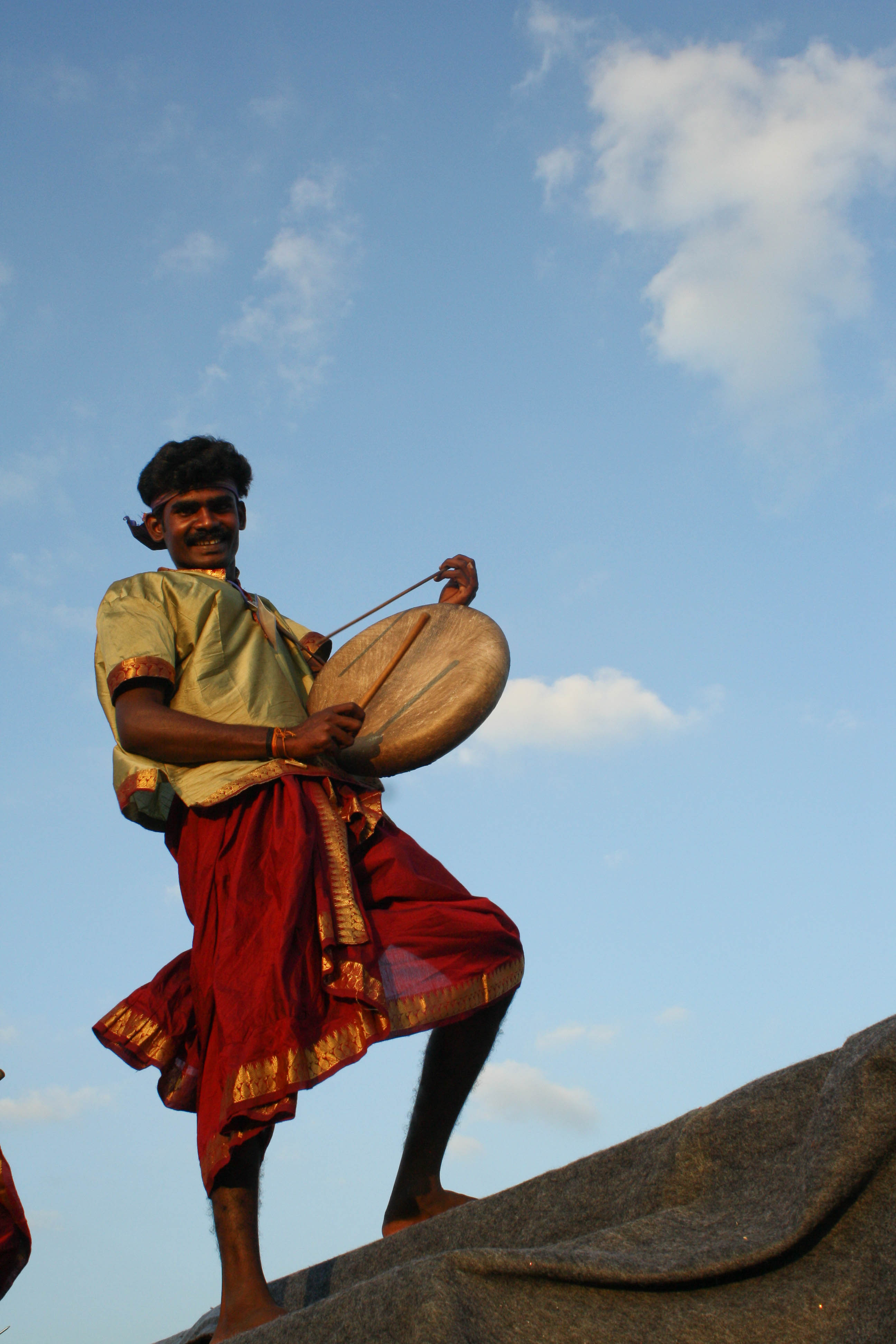
Parai Attam, a dance form based on parai

In paraiattam (also called thappattam), the player of the instrument is also the dancer. The parai is slung by a cloth strap called Nadai (though leather straps are also used) over one shoulder vertically and is held between the other hand and the performer's body. The harness and the holding position lets the player or drummer to play the instrument while dancing in different positions including standing or walking. In a seated position, the parai is held on the lap. The short stick is loosely held between the thumb and other fingers of the strong or dominant hand, positioned near the lower rim of the drum. The off or weak hand, which holds the long stick, rests on the upper part of the frame, positioned at a downward-pointing angle. The base of the stick is gripped by the thumb and index fingers and balanced between the other fingers to be moved back and forth to beat the drum. There are three fundamental strokes from which all of the rhythmic patterns are derived: striking the center of the drum with the shorter stick; slapping the center of the drum with the long stick; and striking the drum with both sticks, the dominant immediately followed by the off.

The membrane is tempered using heat generated from a small bonfire and achieve corresponding variation of beats. The tempering causes the moisture from the hide to evaporate, stiffening and tightening the membrane, which is essential to produce loud, high pitched beats. It is considered a bad-omen if the hide becomes torn or there are black spots forming on he hide due to incorrect tempering.

Playing of Parai

The dance contains numerous patterns which resemble the patterns of classical dances with the players swaying and stamping their feet in synchronization to the beat. There is also a variation known as Parai Meala Koothu, where many players stand facing each other and play to contrasting emotions. There are five basic rhythms used in parai attam: Othayadi, Thenmangu, Saamiyaattam, Thullal and Uyirppu, but it may vary across regions. There were 156 variations of drum beats or adi used for different purposes and for designating various emotions. While the instrument was generally played by males, females have also been known to partake in the same.

== Usage ==
It is a traditional instrument used in South India, majorly by the Tamil people in Tamil Nadu, Sri Lanka and other regions with Tamil diaspora such as South East Asia and Caribbean. The drums were used for multiple purposes including signaling people to gather, alerting them to upcoming wars and announcing victory or defeat, breach of water bodies, gathering farmers for farming, warning about wild animals. It is also commonly played during festivals, folk dances, weddings and functions. The instrument is played in Hindu temple processions accompanying Hindu gods and goddesses. It is used in the worship of traditional Tamil deities like Muneeswarar.

The instrument is generally played with Tharai, a traditional woodwind instrument in Tamil festivals and folk arts. It might also be accompanied with other traditional instruments in functions and rituals. Apart from the standalone parai attam dance, the instrument accompanies with the performance of Street theatre (therukoothu) and various folk dance forms such as Karakattam, Oyilattam etc. It is also used as an accompaniment for the dappankuthu dance. In the 21st century, variations and fusion of other music and dance forms with parai have been developed such as Parai Bharatham, a fusion of parai music with Bharatanatyam and mixtures with other western dance forms.

The instrument is also played commonly in funerals which might have arisen from the practice of playing to ascertain the death if the person does not show any movement. In the last century, the instrument became increasingly associated with funerals rather than auspicious occasions and became a symbol of untouchability and marginalization of Dalit communities. In the recent years, there have been renewed interest in the instrument and movements to project it as a traditional instrument rather than an object of impunity.

The instrument has also been played and showcased in urban festivals like the Chennai Sangamam in Chennai and Tamil Thiruvizha in Coimbatore.

== In popular culture ==
The English word paraiah, denoting an outcast, was derived from the name of the instrument. In India, the people who played the instrument were mostly Dalits, who were known as Pariyar and the term was used earlier in a demeaning tone to describe the people by the Brahmins and other dominant castes.

Tharai Thappattai was a Tamil language film, directed by Bala and released in 2016. Its music director, Ilaiyaraaja, is known to use traditional instruments including parai in the compositions.

== See also ==
- Paraiyar
- Tamil culture
