= Tharai =

Wind instrument from South India

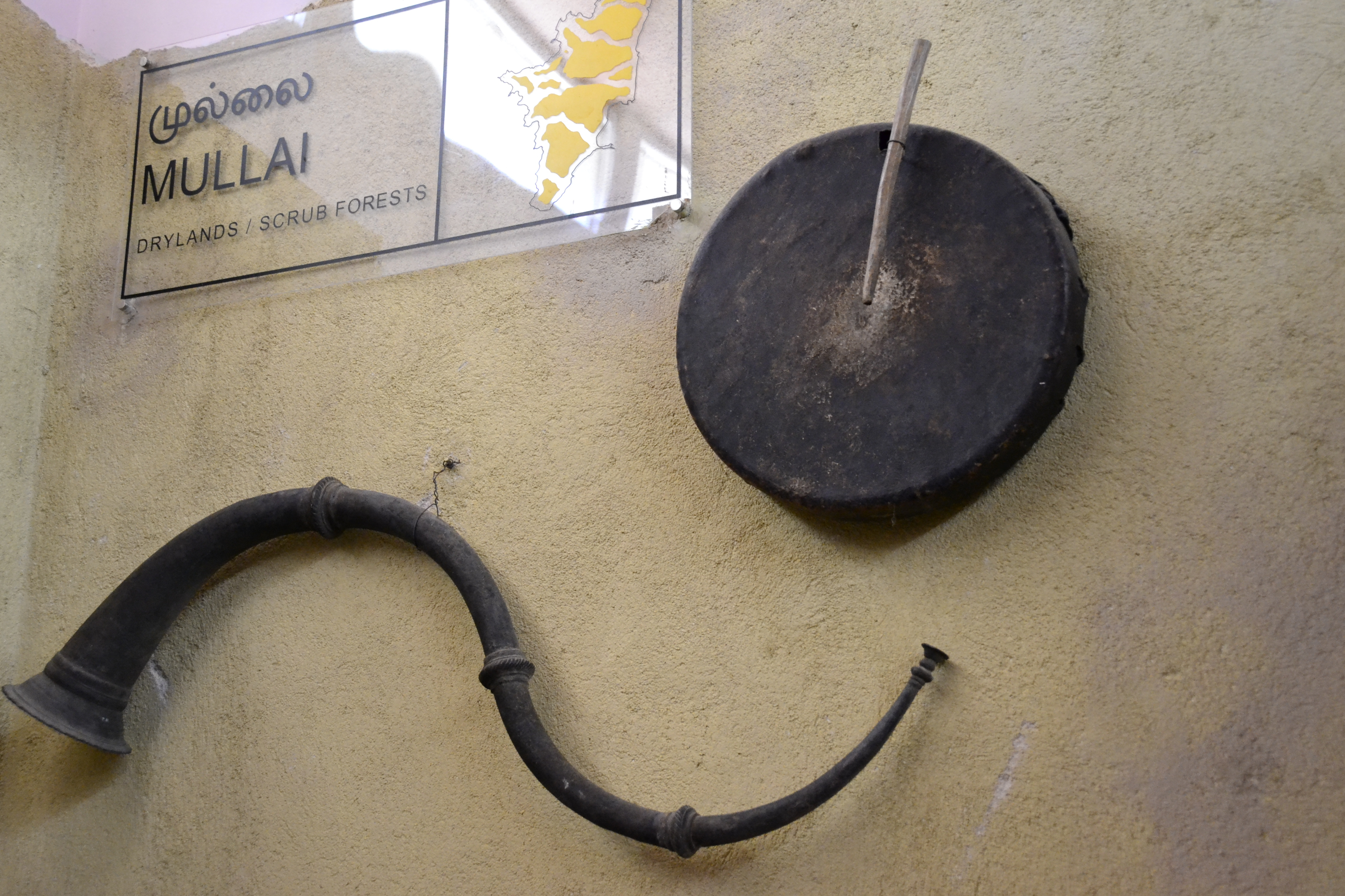
- A traditional Tharai made of metal (along with Thappattai)
- Other names: Thaarai
- Classification: Wind instruments

Tharai or Thaarai is a wind instrument from South India. It is a traditional instrument played during festivals, folk dances, weddings and functions. The instrument in played predominantly in Tamil Nadu and in some parts of Kerala. There are many variants of the instrument, including longer and shorter versions, curved or straight and the outer pipe may be made of metal or wood. The instrument might be played along with thappattai, a percussion instrument in folk dances and festivities or accompanied by traditional thavil and nadaswaram in rituals and functions.

== History ==
The exact origin of the instrument is not clear. The instrument was one of the ancient native music instruments developed and used by the Tamil people. The Tirumurai, a twelve-volume compendium of hymns dated from 6th to the 11th century CE, mentions the instrument.

சங்கொடு தாரை காளந் தழங்கொலி முழங்கு பேரி
வெங்குரற் பம்பை கண்டை வியன்றுடி திமிலைதட்டி
பொங்கொலிச் சின்ன மெல்லாம்பொருபடை மிடைந்தபொற்பின்
மங்குல்வான் கிளர்ச்சி நாண மருங்கெழுந் தியம்பி மல்க

— Thirumurai verse 581

Tamil pronunciation: [əŋgoɖʉ t̪ɑːɾəj kɑːɭən t̪əɻəŋgolɪˑ mʊɻəŋgʉ peːɾɪ
ʋɛŋgʉɾər pəmbəj kəɳɖəj ʋɪjənd̺ʳʉɖɪˑ t̪ɪmɪləjd̪əʈʈɪ
poŋgolɪtʃ tʃɪnnə mɛllɑːmboɾʉbəɖəj mɪɖəjn̪d̪əborpɪn
məŋgʉlʋɑːn kɪɭərtʃtʃɪˑ nɑːɳə məɾʉŋgɛɻʉn t̪ɪjəmbɪˑ məlgə]

— Thirumurai verse 581

When sage Agastya propagated the details of Siddha medicine to the other sages, he was welcomed by a procession with music including the traditional tharai.

== Construction and variants ==
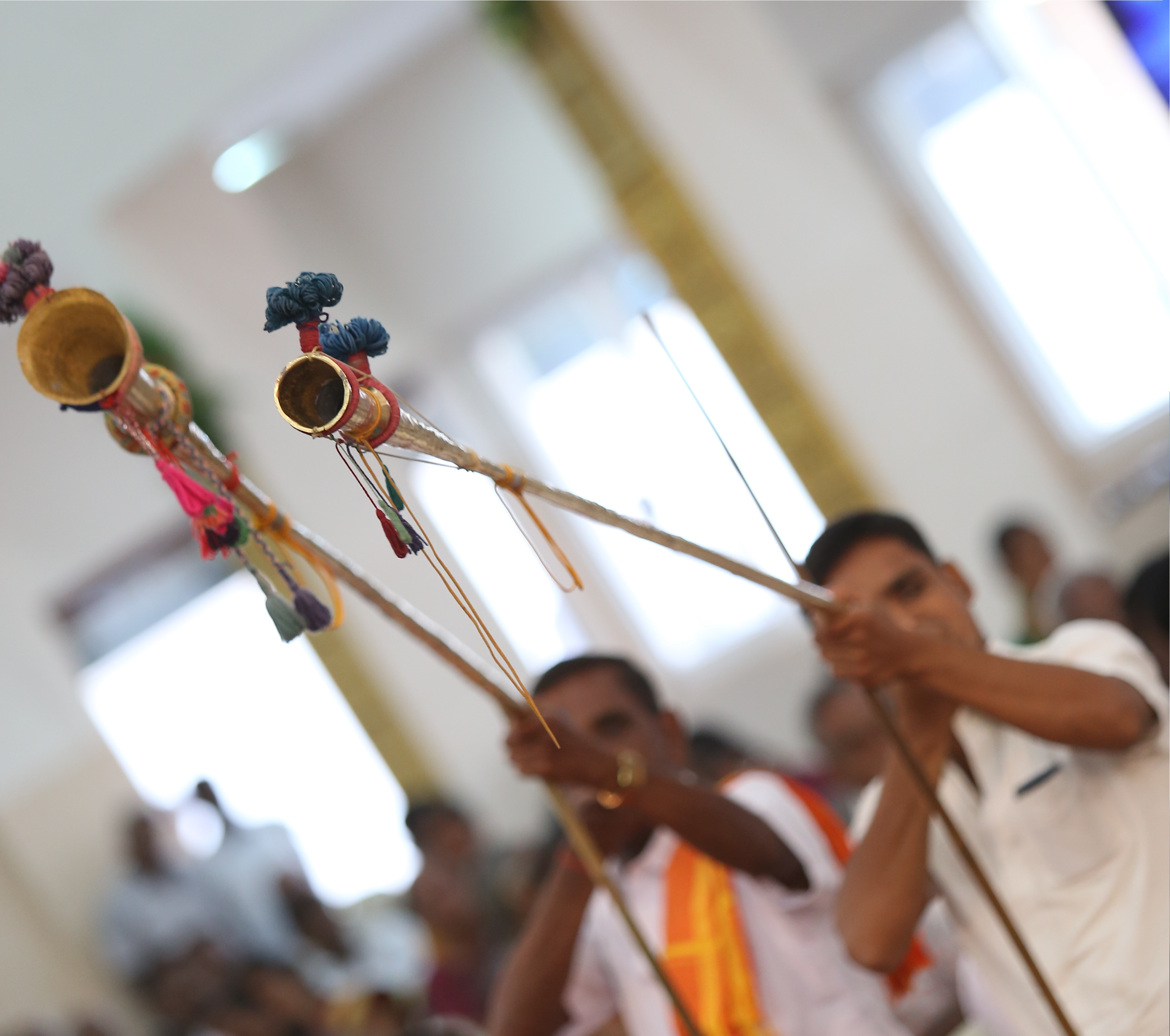
A pair of Nedunthaarais played during a Tamil wedding

The instrument may be curved or straight. The curved version like a "s" is generally made of a metal or alloy like brass similar to the kombu. The name is derived from Kombu in Tamil language meaning cow's horn. Araivatta kombu tharai, is a variant of the same, which is a crescent-shaped brass instrument with araivatta meaning "crescent" in Tamil.

It may also be a longitudinal thin cylinder like a pole with up to 12 ft (3.7 m) length, made up of wood, which produces a continuous sound if wind pressure is applied. There are two variants of the same: a shorter version known as Kuttathaarai with kutta meaning short in Tamil and a longer version known as Nedunthaarai with nedu meaning long or far in Tamil.

== Occasions ==
It is a traditional instrument played in South India, majorly by the Tamil people in Tamil Nadu. It is commonly played during festivals, folk dances, weddings and functions. The instrument is played in Hindu temple processions accompanying Hindu gods and goddesses. It is used in the worship of traditional Tamil deities like Muneeswarar.

Sangu ndha sekhandi tharai parai vathiyam
Mangalamai muzhangida mahimayodu varugiraar
Thongum meesai kathiyaam, thudikkum kannil sakthiyaam
Ingithamai nethiyil olirum neeru venmayai

— Muneeswarar Stotram verse 3

The instrument is generally played with Thappattai, a traditional percussion instrument in Tamil festivals and folk arts and might be accompanied sometimes by other traditional instruments such as Urumi melam in Kerala and Naiyandi melam. It is also played with Thavil, a percussion instrument and Nadaswaram, a double reed wind instrument, commonly played in Tamil weddings, functions and rituals. The instrument is played in the background for the performance of Tamil folk dances such as Salangai attam.

The instrument has also been played and showcased in urban festivals like the Chennai Sangamam in Chennai and Tamil Thiruvizha in Coimbatore.

== In popular culture ==
Tharai Thappattai was a Tamil language film, directed by Bala and released in 2016. Music director Ilaiyaraaja is known to use traditional instruments including tharai in the compositions.

== See also ==
- Kombu, a similar wind instrument
- Parai, a percussion instrument often accompanying Tharai
