= Poikkal Kudhirai =

Poikkal Kudhirai may refer to:

- Poikkaal Kuthirai Aattam, one of the folk dances of Tamil Nadu, India
- Poikkal Kudhirai (1983 film), directed by K. Balachander
- Poikkal Kudhirai (2022 film), directed by Santhosh P. Jayakumar.
