= BLR Hubba =

Cultural Festival

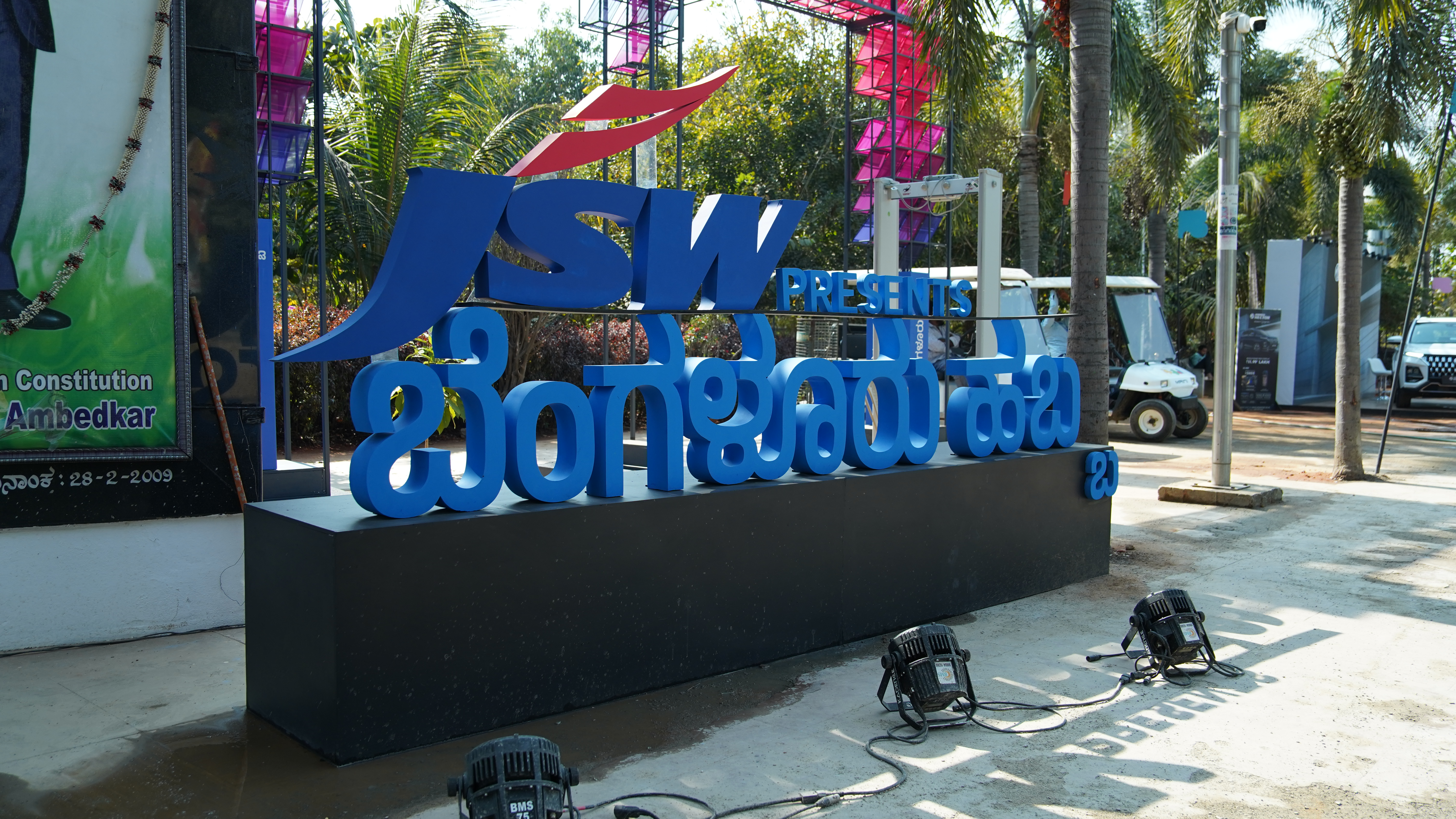
- Genre: Art & Culture
- Begins: December 2023
- Location: Bengaluru
- Website: blrhubba.in

BLR Hubba is an annual arts and cultural festival held in Bengaluru, India, anchored by the UnboxingBLR Foundation, a not-for-profit that has been documenting Bengaluru's journey over the years and helping citizens and people engage better with the city.

The festival presents a range of cultural programs, including music, dance, theater, visual arts, food, walks, and heritage-related events, and is conducted across multiple venues in the city. These have included cultural institutions, public parks, and street locations.

The festival's name, "Hubba" rather than "Habba", is a deliberate reference to Bengaluru's identity as a hub for artists, performers, storytellers, and creative communities, alongside its long-standing reputation for technology, entrepreneurship, and innovation.

Conceived as a city-wide cultural initiative, BLR Hubba utilizes both conventional and non-traditional public spaces as performance and exhibition sites. Since its inception in 2023, the festival has expanded in scale and duration.

== History ==
In 2023, the UnboxingBLR Foundation launched BLR Hubba as a platform to showcase Bengaluru's arts and culture and encourage public participation in the city's creative spaces. The festival was developed with an emphasis on decentralizing cultural programming by hosting events across multiple neighborhoods rather than at a single centralized venue.

Over successive editions, BLR Hubba broadened its scope to include additional artistic disciplines and formats, such as curated walks, thematic programs, and sub-festivals. The festival has featured a mix of local practitioners and participants from outside Bengaluru, and, in some cases, from international contexts.

== Editions ==
=== First edition (2024) ===
The inaugural edition of BLR Hubba was held in 2024 as a multi-venue cultural festival across Bengaluru. Programming included performances and exhibitions in music, dance, theatre, and visual arts. Events were organized at various locations within the city, with an emphasis on accessibility and public engagement. Organizer estimates indicated substantial public attendance during the festival period.

=== Second edition (2025) ===
The second edition expanded the festival's programming and geographic reach within Bengaluru. Additional art forms, collaborative events, and non-traditional venues were incorporated into the schedule. According to reports, the second edition experienced increased attendance compared to the inaugural year, reflecting growing public interest in the festival.

=== Third edition ===
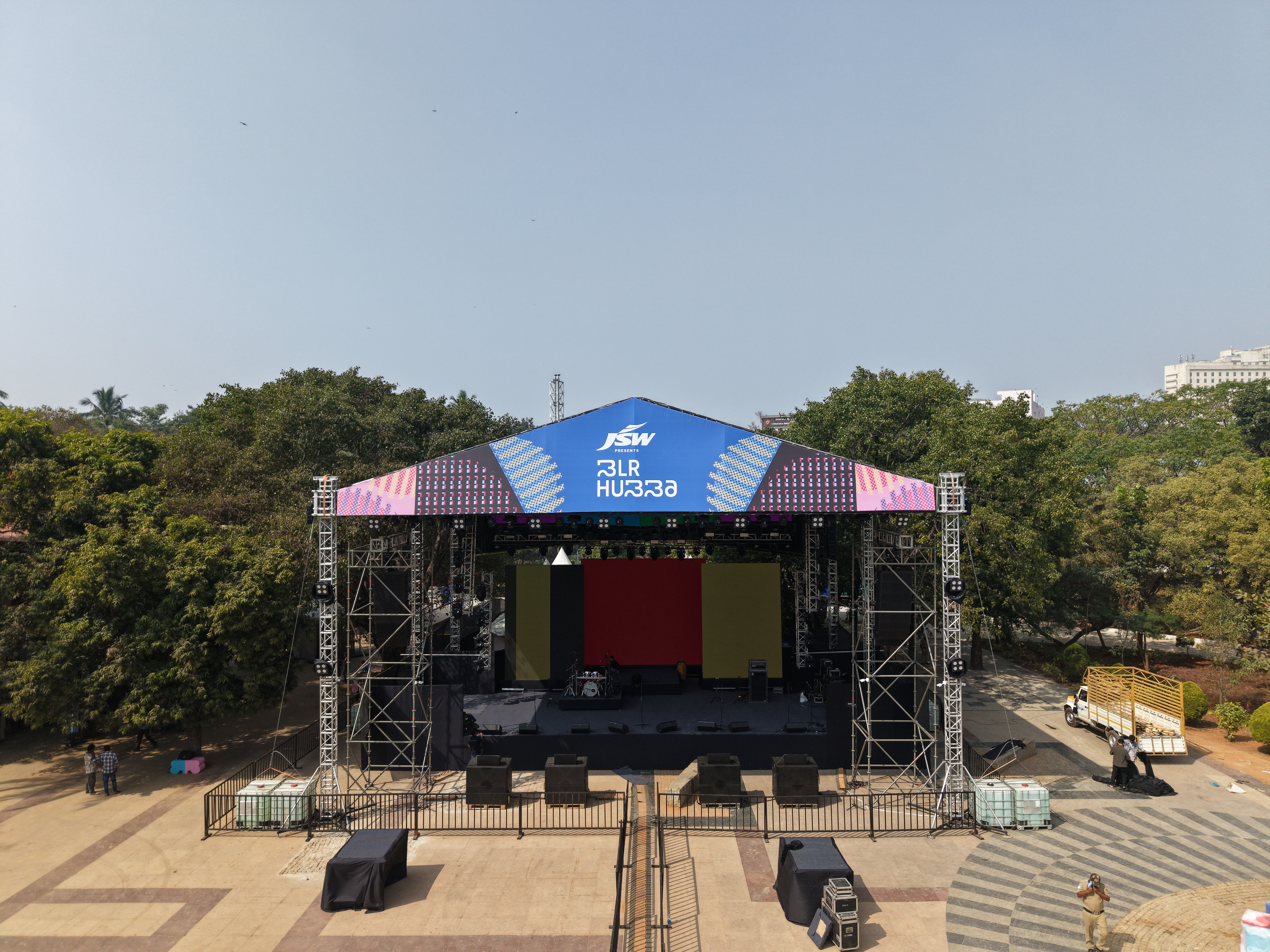
BLR HUBBA 2026 Festival Stage in Bengaluru

The third edition of BLR Hubba was held from 16 to 25 January 2026. It was planned as a multi-day festival featuring over 350 events across multiple venues in the city. The 2026 edition brought together programming across multiple venues in Bengaluru, including Freedom Park, Sabha, Panchavati, Bangalore International Centre, National Gallery of Modern Art, Alliance Francaise, and ADA Rangamandira.

Some notable performers and artists at BLR Hubba over the years include Marty Friedman, Manganiyar Seduction, Indian Ocean, Shilpa Gupta, LN Tallur, MD Pallavi, and Vasu Dixit.

Supported by the Government of Karnataka, government agencies, corporate partners, and foundations, BLR Hubba continues to position Bengaluru as a centre for cultural exchange and artistic collaboration.

=== Fourth edition (2027) ===
The fourth edition is scheduled to be held from 15 to 24 January 2027, introducing new categories through which to experience the festival – Showcase, Market, and Lab, alongside an expanded slate of sub-festivals and programming.

== Sponsors ==
BLR Hubba is anchored by the UnboxingBLR Foundation and presented in partnership with the Government of Karnataka. The 3rd and 4th editions of the festival are supported by title sponsor JSW Group, with festival sponsors Go Native, Manipal Foundation, and Prestige Group. It is also supported by multiple cultural foundations, local partners such as Greater Bengaluru Authority, Department of Kannada and Culture, Bengaluru City Police, Bengaluru Metro Rail Corporation Limited, National Gallery of Modern Art, Ministry of Culture, Kempegowda International Airport, the Department of Tourism, and the Karnataka State Tourism Development Corporation.

== Venues ==
BLR Hubba events are held at various locations across the city. Key venues include Freedom Park, the Bangalore International Centre, the National Gallery of Modern Art (NGMA), Sabha, IIWC, Panchavati as well as public streets and metro stations.

== See also ==
- Kadalekai Parishe, annual groundnut fair in Basavanagudi and Malleshwaram of Bangalore
