= Chennai Sangamam =

Annual Tamil cultural festival in Chennai, India

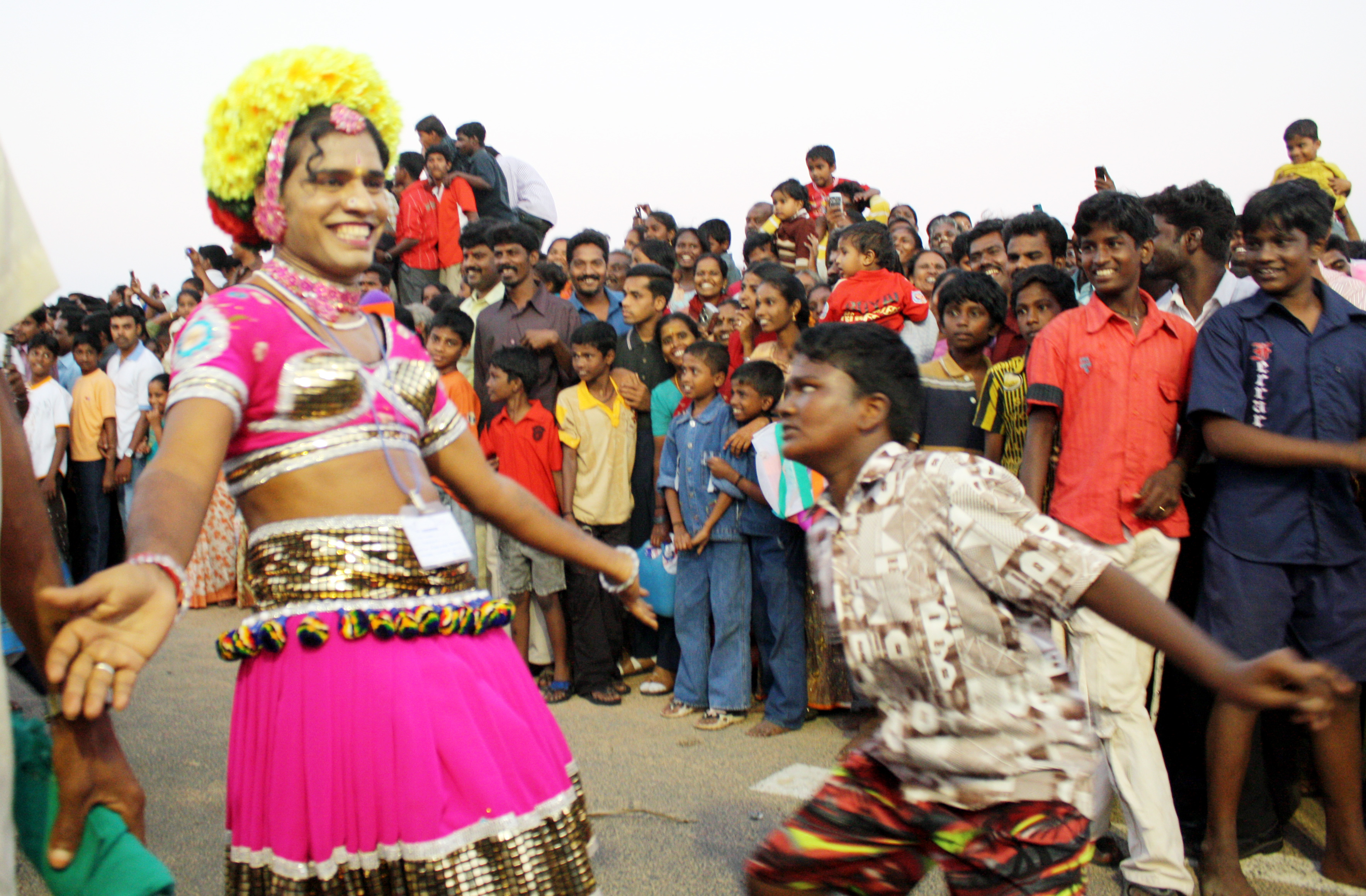
Koothu performance at Chennai Sangamam

Chennai Sangamam (Tamil: சென்னை சங்கமம்) is a large annual open Tamil cultural festival held in the city of Chennai. The festival is organized by the Tamil Maiyam and Department of Tourism and Culture of the Government of Tamil Nadu with the intention of rejuvenating the old village festivals, art and artists. The festival is centered on the occasion of Tamil harvest festival of Pongal, and takes place for a week-long period. The festival is conceived to be the longest and biggest open Festival in India.

== History ==
The idea of organizing a festival during Pongal showcasing the culture of Tamil Nadu was conceived by Kanimozhi, Member of Parliament from Tamil Nadu and daughter of M Karunanidhi and Rev.Fr. Jegath Gaspar Raj, founder of Tamil Maiyam, in September 2006. The festival was rolled out in 2007, with patronization of the Government of Tamil Nadu.

== Festival description ==
The festival is organized at various places in Chennai city including beaches, parks, corporation grounds, college / school grounds and shopping malls. The idea to have it in the open parks, beaches and streets was an inspiration from the Bengaluru Habba celebrations. The events that mark the festival include traditional and folk music shows folk dances, martial arts, classical music and dance performances, street plays, drama / theater, etc. Apart from these, food component got added in the second edition of Chennai Sangamam in 2008 where food outlets catering traditional Tamil cuisine also became part of the celebrations. More than 2,000 performers take part in the event which accommodates around 4,000 performances annually.
