= Puliyattam =

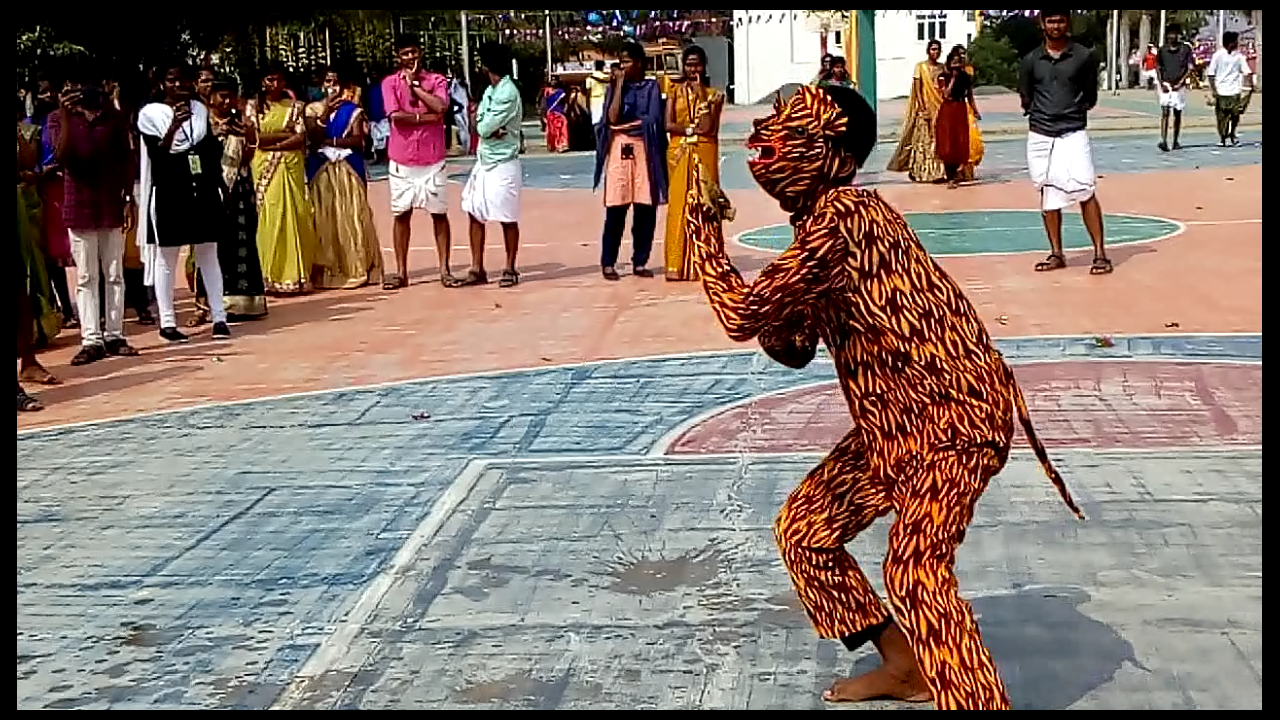
Puliyattam playing

Puliyattam (means tiger Dance) is an old folk art dance of Tamil Nadu. A highly exuberant and cultural festival, this dance form usually comprises a troupe of 6 performers aping the movements of the majestic, predatory tigers. Their bodies are painted by the painstaking efforts of local artists in vibrant yellow and black to resemble an exact replica of a tiger. The paintings include the ferocious looking fangs and convincing headgear replete with ears, paws with claws, and a long tail that conjures an accurate picture of the savage beast’s graceful movements.

The thunderous roars of drums beating wildly along with several local instruments reproduce the snarls of the regal predators and complete the picture. Sometimes to incorporate a touch of reality, a vulnerable goat is tied and the dancers pretend to seize upon the helpless creature and thereby kill it. Apart from the tiger, the dancers are often adorned in the beautiful spots of a leopard or the eerie dark shades of a black panther.

The art nowadays is very rarely performed in Tamil Nadu but is still performed in Kerala (Pulikali/Puliyattam), Andhra Pradesh (Pulivesham) and Karnataka (Hulivesha).

== See also ==
- Dance forms of Tamil Nadu
- History of Tamil Nadu
- Ancient Tamil music
- Carnatic music
