= Mayilattam =

South Indian dance

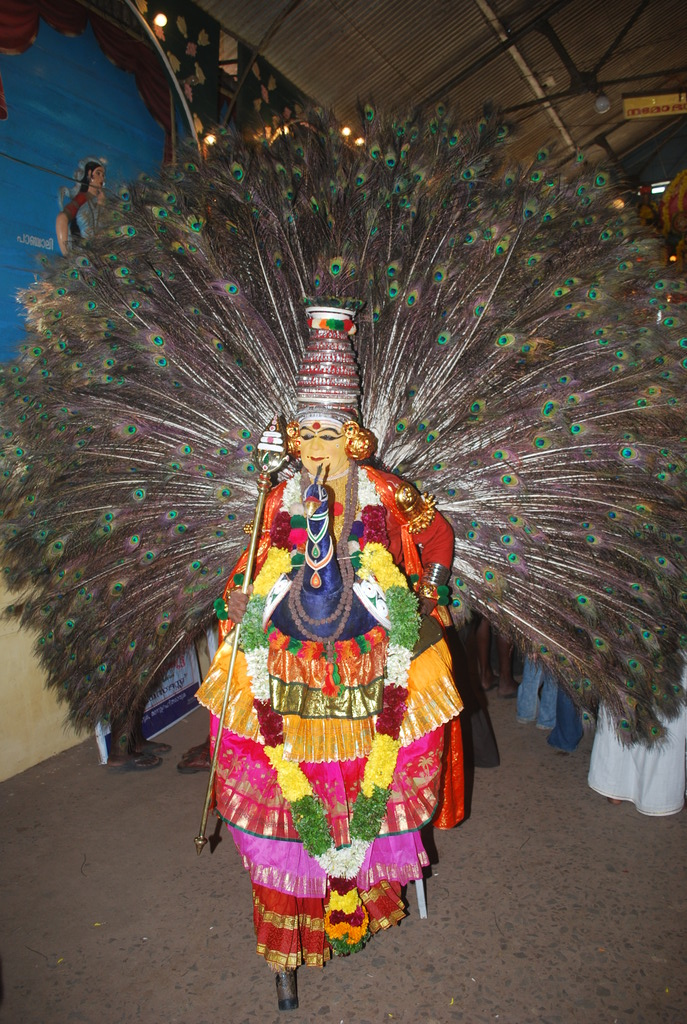
A mayilattam performer

Mayilattam is an artistic and religious form of dance performed in the Hindu temples of Tamil Nadu and Kerala in reverence to Murugan, a regional form of the Hindu deity Kartikeya. Mayilattam literally translates as the "peacock dance". During the dance, the performers seat themselves upon a peacock replica, which is the mount of the deity.

== Description ==
Mayilattam performers wear costumes from head to toe with headdresses and peacock feathers, that can be opened and closed using a thread, and perform specific dances. The performers dance on tall pieces of wood attached to the ends of their feet. This dance is performed in all Murugan temples as a tradition during festivals.

The Mayilattam dance is thought to have originated in Tamil Nadu, where ladies used to perform it to honor Lord Subrahmanya, also known as Kartikeya or Murugan, the son of Shiva and Parvati. This dance is typically performed by females dressed in peacock forms.

This art needs a lot of practice and training. During festivals, this dance is performed in all Murugan (Lord Subrahmanya) temples as a custom.

Mayilattam dance isn't complete without the appropriate attire. Along with the show, the dress code adds to the allure. Imitating the movement and style of a peacock is part of the dance movement. The dancer demonstrates how the bird cleans its feathers with its beak and legs, with meticulous planning and execution. The melody is then followed by close steps going at a slow rhythmic speed. As the time and rhythm speed, each movement follows a circular pattern. Finally, when the music reaches its height, the circular pattern's order is shattered. However, because of difficulty in practising and lower pay for dancers, the number of Mayilattam performers is dwindling.

== Costume ==
The outfit is built up from a headdress, ornaments, and a skirt of iridescent peacock feathers. A dancer may spend two to three weeks gathering the feathers and putting the costume together.

== Contemporary practice ==
The dance honours Murugan, and in some traditions Krishna, and is performed during the Thaipusam festival. Among the Tamil diaspora in Malaysia it is danced at the Batu Caves temple, where performers keep the tradition going at Thaipusam even as the number of dancers and teachers falls.
