= Oyilattam =

Indian Dance Form

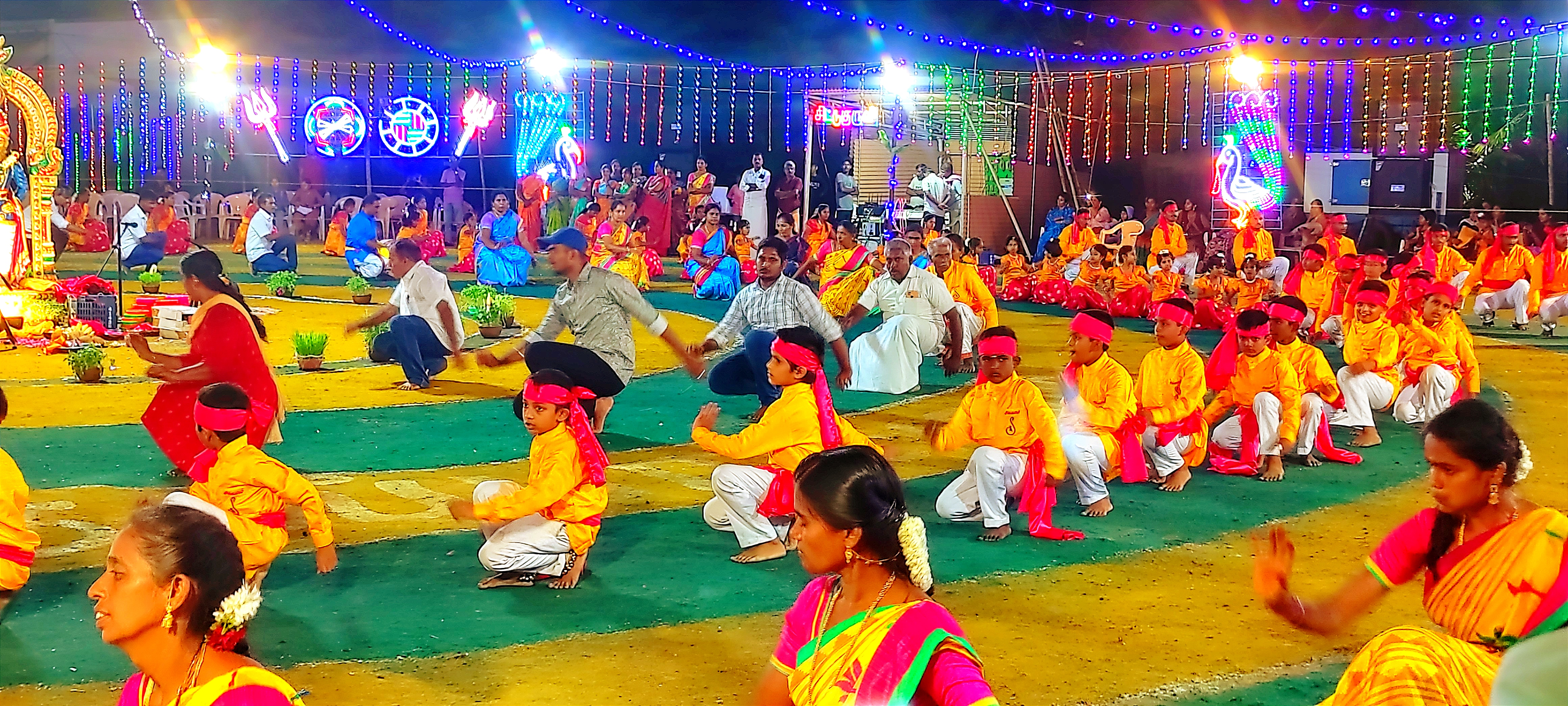
Oyilattam

Oyilattam (Meaning: dance of grace) is a folk dance with origins in the Madurai region of Tamil Nadu. The dance has its origins in southern Tamil Nadu and is primarily performed in Madurai district, Tirunelveli district and Tiruchirapalli district. It was traditionally a dance where a few men would stand in a row with two kerchiefs perform rhythmic steps to the musical accompaniment, with the number of dancers increasing; over the past ten years women have also started performing this dance. Typically, the musical accompaniment is the Thavil and the performers have coloured handkerchiefs tied to their fingers and wear ankle bells. Oyilattam is one of the folk arts identified for mainstreaming by the Tamil university. Mainly Oyilattam is performed at village festivals. It is a dance used after harvest to protect the grains from birds.
