= Poikkaal Kuthirai Aattam =

Indian folk dance

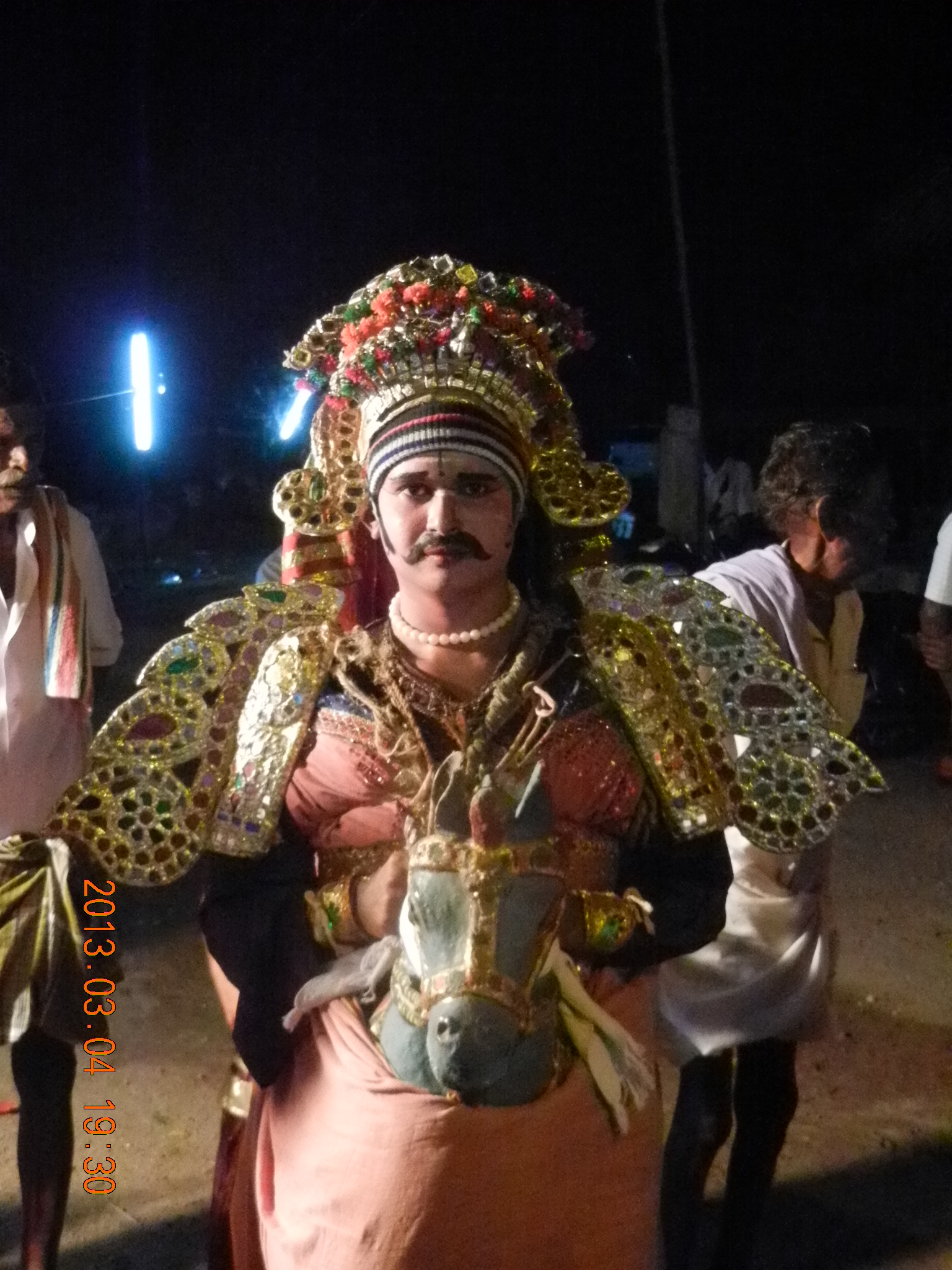
Poikkaal Kuthirai Aattam performer

Poikkaal Kuthirai Aattam (poi - False, kaal - leg, Kuthirai – Horse) or Puravi Aattam (Tamil:பொய்க்கால் குதிரை ஆட்டம்) (Dummy Horse Dance) is one of the folk dances of Tamil Nadu. It is a type of dance performed with a dummy horse having a gap inside so that a person can fit into it to perform the dance.

== Materials ==
The dummy figure of a horse's body is made of light-weighted materials (jute, cardboard, paper, and glass), and the cloth at the sides of the dummy swings to and fro covering the legs of the dancer. The dancers tie wooden legs to their feet so that sound is evoked when they are tapped on the floor, which sound like the hooves of the horse. The dancer brandishes either a sword or a whip.

== Performers ==
This folk dance needs much training and skill to perform. The show is performed by men as well as women. This artistic performance is generally arranged during religious festivals and provides entertainment to the masses.

== Background music ==
This dance is rendered to the accompaniment of music such as clarionet, drum, south Indian folk dance instruments such as Kundalam, Naiyaandi Melam, Thavil, Nadhaswaram, Pambai and Thalam.

== Performance ==
This artistic performance is connected to the worship of Ayyanar and prevails mainly around Thanjavur. This dance is performed by a pair of dancers impersonating a king and queen. Sometimes, they indulge in acrobatics and they entertain the folk for hours together. The dummy-horse show is one of the main attractions in the republic day festivities at New Delhi and folk artists are sent from Tamil Nadu every year to perform this show.

== Alternate view ==
Recent research on poikaal Kuthirai dance dispelled the myth that this art is ancient and of Maratha origin.
