= Bommalattam (disambiguation) =

Bommalattam is a type of puppetry using inanimate objects from Tamil Nadu.

Bommalattam or Bommalata may also refer to:

- Bommalattam (1968 film)
- Bommalattam (2008 film)
- Bommalattam (TV series)
- Bommalata (2004 film)
