= Kayalar (Muslim) =

Muslim community in Tamil Nadu, South India

The Kayalar are a Muslim community found in the state of Tamil Nadu in India. They are one of the four major sub-groups that make up the Tamil Muslim community. The Kayalar mainly live along the Coromandel coast.

== History ==
The Kayalar (along with other Tamil Muslims) are descended from Arab merchants and converted locals. The Kayalar claim to have converted under the influence of Shafi Arabs. The Kayalars were known as an important mercantile community within society. The modern Kayalars are Sunni Muslims of the Shafi school.

== See also ==
- Labbay
