= Bommalattam =

Puppet art form of Tamil Nadu

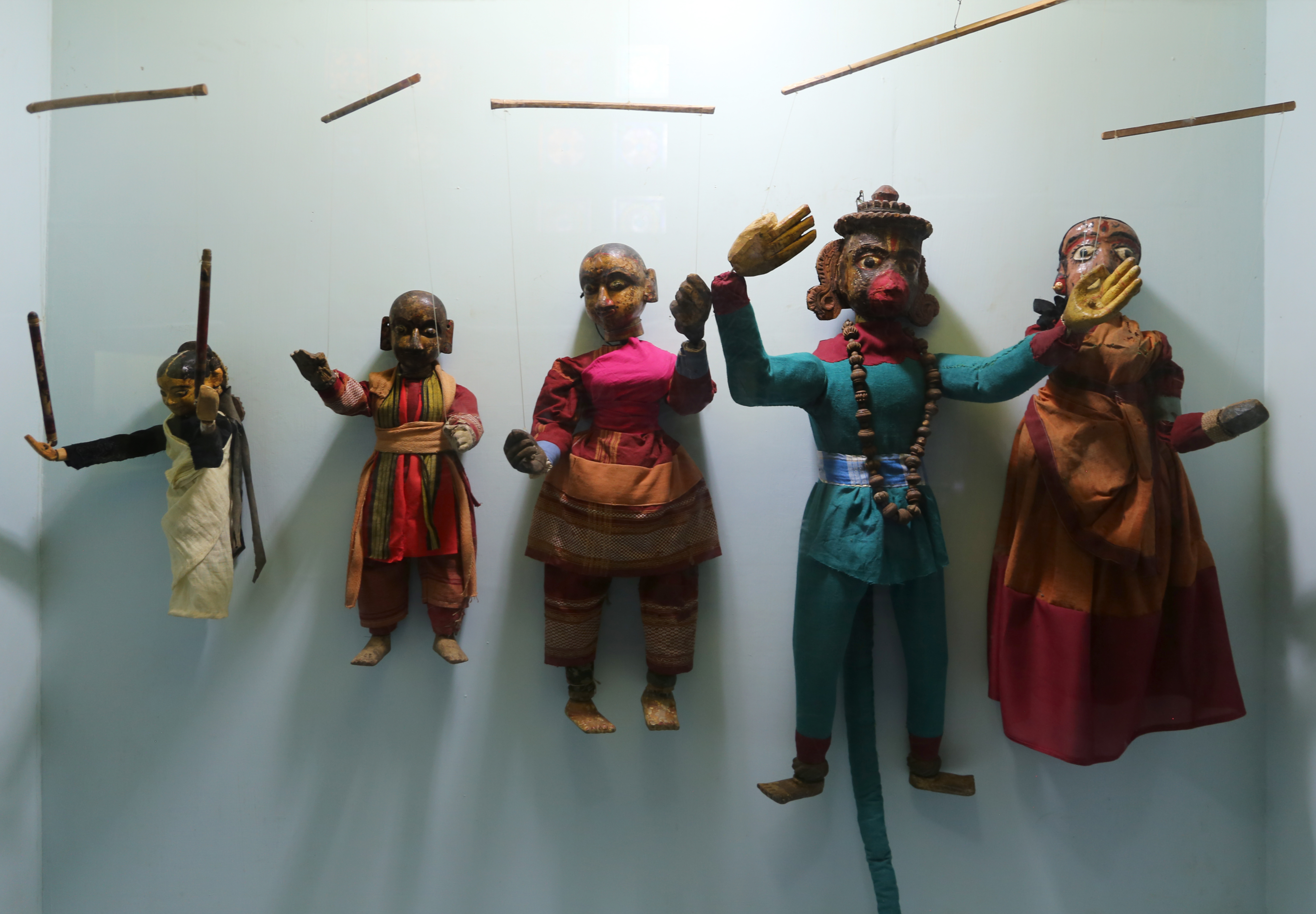
- Doll marionettes used in Bommalattam
- Etymology: Portmanteau of the Tamil words bommai (doll marionette), and attam (dance)
- Genre: Puppetry
- Origin: Tamil Nadu, India

Bommalattam is a type of puppetry using inanimate objects from Tamil Nadu. While the origin of the art is uncertain, it has existed as an art form for years. It uses various doll marionettes, manipulated by rods and strings by puppeteers behind a screen, lighted by traditional lamps. It is usually accompanied by music and story telling.

== Background and history ==
Bommalattam is a type of puppetry, that originated in the region. While the origin of the art is uncertain, it has existed as an art form for years.

== Setup ==
It uses various doll marionettes which are 1–3 ft (0.30–0.91 m) tall and may weigh up to 10 kg (22 lb). The puppets are manipulated by rods and strings attached to the heads, back, arms and legs. The puppets are made of lightweight wood and are dressed in crafted costumes bulked up by paper stuffings to give a more rounded appearance. The puppets are carefully crafted with prominent jewellery so that the edges are visible in the shadows. Puppeteers stand overhead in an area 4 ft (1.2 m) high and 11 ft (3.4 m) wide.

The puppet staging area is created by stretching a black cloth over a bench and the puppets are operated behind a white screen illuminated by a lantern or oil lamps. The audience are seated in front of the screen with the screen literally separating the performers and audience, who are able to view the shadows of the puppets which are operated by the puppeteers. The puppeteers wear bells which are sounded along with the movements with background music played by traditional instruments such as cymbals, harmonium and mridangam.

== Operation ==
The puppeteer operate the puppets by holding a ring or rod with strings attached and using movements from hands and arms to control the devices such as the rods and strings. The puppeteer might engage in narration of the stories while dancing the puppets. The puppeteers may engage in actions corresponding to the music and might sometimes follow the dance patterns of classical Bharatanatyam.

== Usage ==
The themes are drawn from various Hindu scriptures such as the Puranas and epics and/with local folklore. The puppet shows are held during festivals and fairs, commonly in villages. The puppet shows are also part of rituals conducted to ward of evil forces, prevent epidemics and end droughts by invoking rain. Bommalattam is usually followed as a family tradition with all members of the family engaged in making the puppets, maintaining them and performing. Pava Koothu is a variation of puppetry which uses handheld glove puppets.

== In popular culture ==
There have been multiple films of the name:

- Bommalattam (1968)
- Bommalattam (2008)
- Bommalattam (TV series)
