= Bishnupriya people =

Ethnic group in India and Bangladesh

Bishnupriya Manipuri (Bishnupriya Meitei)
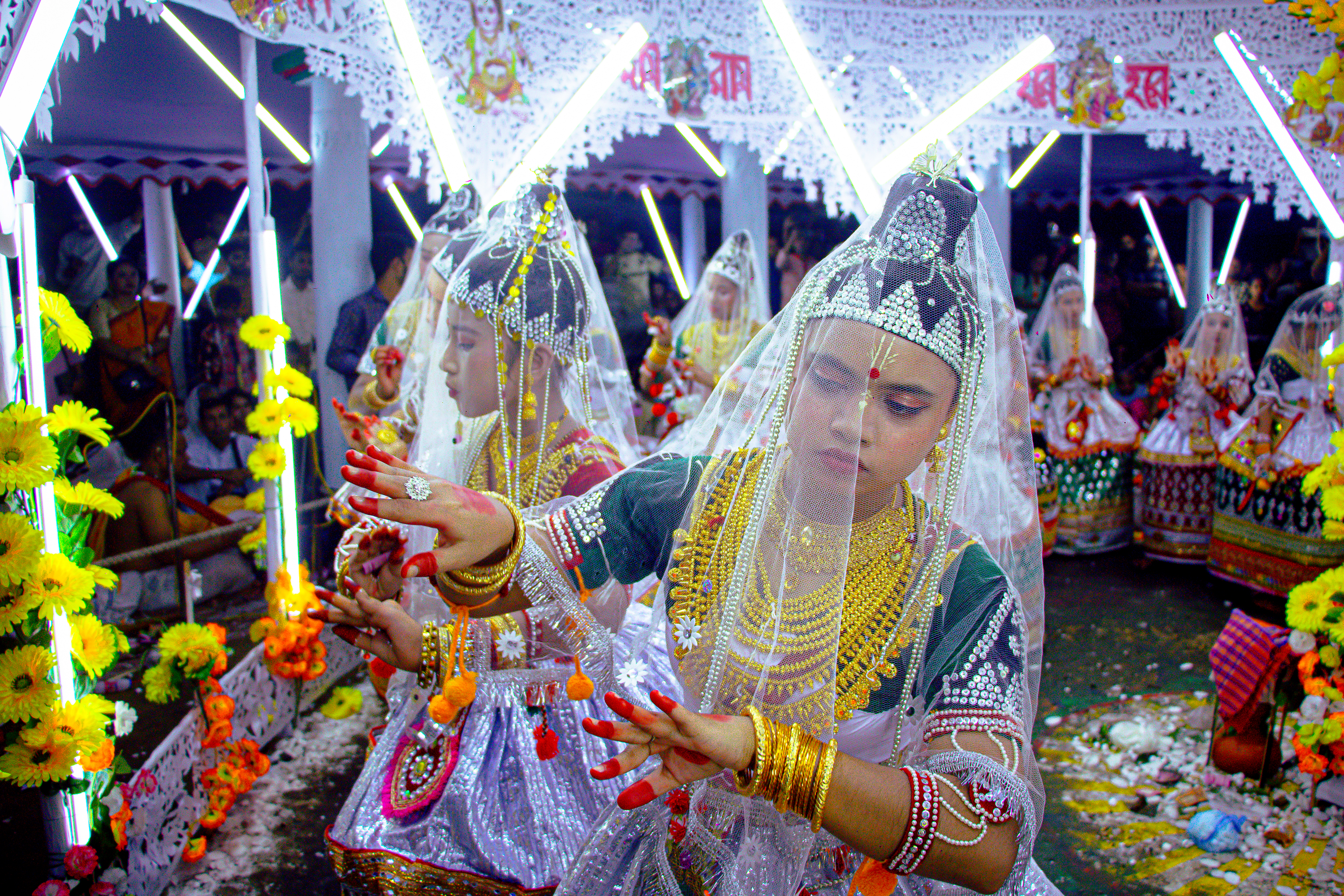
- Manipuri Raas Leela festival performed by the Bishnupriya Manipuri community in Kamalganj, Moulvibazar, Bangladesh

Total population
- 119,646

Regions with significant populations
- India; Bangladesh
- India: 79,646 (2011)
- Bangladesh: 40,000 (2003)

Languages
- Bishnupriya Manipuri (L1); Meitei (L2); Bengali (significantly used)

Religion
- Hinduism (Vaishnavism)

Related ethnic groups
- Other Bengali–Assamese-speaking peoples, Meiteis

The Bishnupriyas, also known as the Bishnupriya Manipuris or Bishnupriya Meiteis, is an ethnic group found in parts of the Northeast Indian states of Assam, Tripura, Manipur and in northeastern Bangladesh. They speak Bishnupriya Manipuri, a language belonging to the Bengali-Assamese branch. Initially regarded as a creole of Bengali and Meitei languages, later studies found that it retains its pre-Bengali features and is closer to both Bengali and Assamese languages. The most distinctive feature of the language is it is replete with Tibeto-Burman elements. The culture of the Bishnupriya people is strongly influenced by that of the Meitei people. They follow Vaishnavism.

== Status ==
In the 2020s, the Bishnupriya asked be given the status of an indigenous people of Assam and treated like other indigenous communities of the state. The Government of Assam categorises them as an Other Backward Class, but otherwise, they have no legal recognition or official status. The Tripura Government categorised their language under the Tribal Language Cell of the State Council of Educational Research and Training.

== Language ==
The Meitei language in Bangladesh is used as a second language by the Bishnupriya people.
