= KFV =

KFV may refer to:

- Karlsruher FV, a German association football club
- kfv, the ISO 639-3 code for Kurmukar language
- Korean Folk Village, a tourist attraction in Yongin, South Korea
