= Noakhali language =

Bengali-Assamese language

Noakhali
- Noakhali Bengali
- নোয়াখাইল্লা নোয়াখাইল্যা Noakhailla
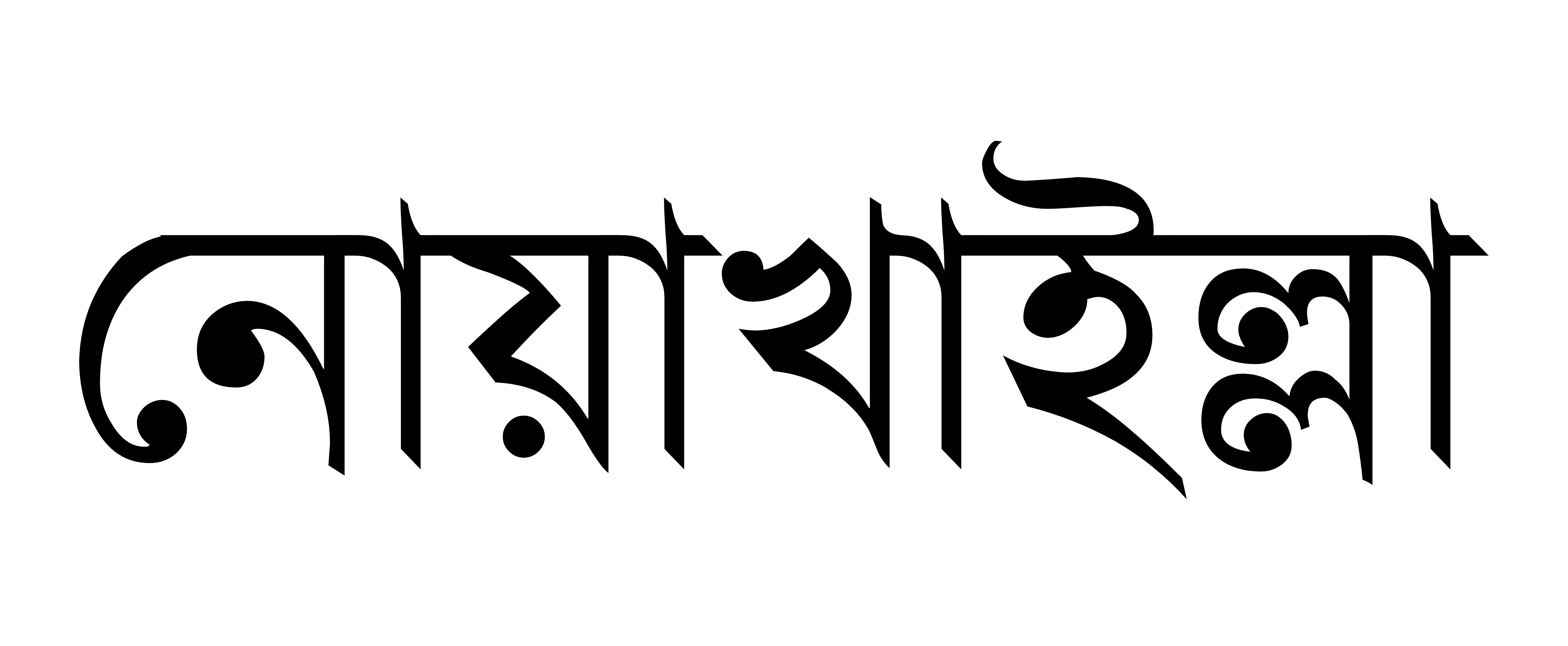
- The word "Nōẇākhāillā" in the Bengali–Assamese script
- Pronunciation: [ˈno̯akʰai̯lːaˑ]
- Native to: Bangladesh and India
- Region: Bangladesh: Greater Noakhali (now Noakhali, Laxmipur and Feni), parts of Chittagong, Comilla and Chandpur district India: parts of Southern Tripura
- Ethnicity: Bengali
- Native speakers: 11 million (estimated)
- Language family: Indo-European: Indo-Iranian; Indo-Aryan; Eastern; Bengali–Assamese; Gauda–Bangla; Southeastern Bengali; Noakhali
- Dialects: Noakhali dialects
- Writing system: Bengali–Assamese script

Language codes
- ISO 639-3: oak
- Glottolog: noak1234 Noakhali feni1234 Feni (Noakhali) hati1234 Hatia islands maij1234 Maijdi
- ELP: Noakhali
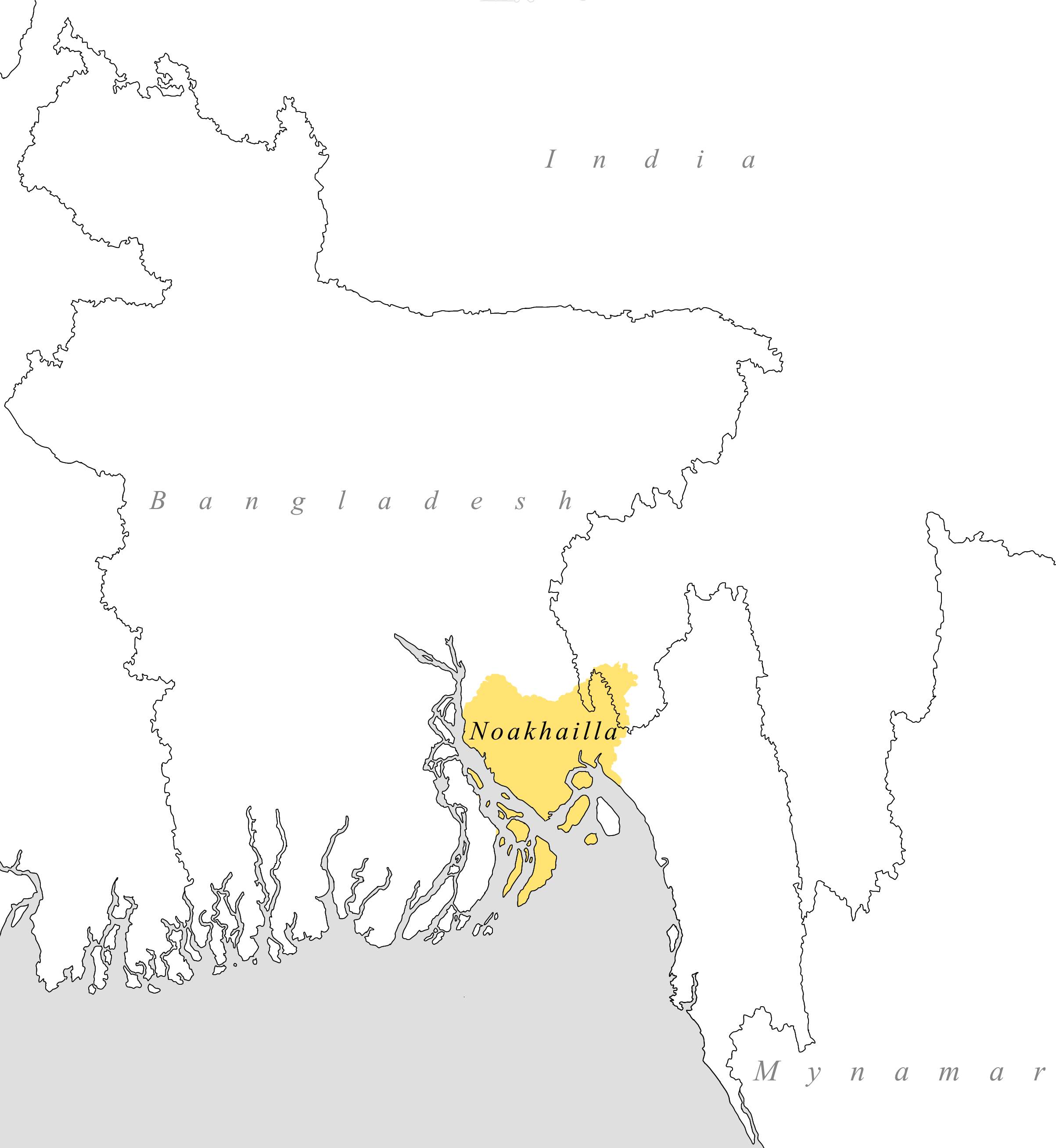
- Map of where Noakhali is spoken

Noakhali or Noakhalian, endonym Nōẇākhāillā (নোয়াখাইল্লা), is an Indo-Aryan language variety spoken by an estimated 7 million Bengalis, primarily in the Greater Noakhali region of Bangladesh, as well as in some southern parts of Tripura in India. The Noakhali language is widely considered a dialect of Bengali. Outside of these regions, there are substantial numbers of Noakhali speakers in other parts of Bangladesh and a diaspora population in the Middle East, Europe and the United States. The language is partially mutually intelligible with Chittagonian, Rohingya and Chakma.

Noakhali has no presence in formal settings, neither in Bangladesh nor India, though its standardisation has been proposed.

== Etymology ==
Noakhailla is eponymously named after the district of Noakhali. It is in the transformed Vangiya form of the archaic Noakhaliya (নোয়াখালীয়া), where "-iya" is a suffix, commonly used in Bengali as a demonym, having gone through a linguistic process called Apinihiti (অপিনিহিতি), a form of epenthesis, to become Noakhailla (নোয়াখাইল্লা). It may also be known in English as Noakhalian, a relatively recent term which has gained prominence as a locative demonym since at the least the Pakistan period. "-an" is a suffix, commonly used in English to denote an action or an adjective that suggests pertaining to, thereby forming an agent noun.

== History ==
Noakhali, the area which it is named after, emerged in the 13th century as a center of regional territorialism by the name of Bhulua. The kings of Bhulua patronised the Sanskrit language. The arrival of Muslims in Bhulua affected the local language to such a level that several Hindu rulers of Bhulua even took the Turkic title of Khan. Muslim migration was extended following the Mughal conquest of Bhulua in which the local language became influenced by Arabic and Persian. The great lexical influence of Arabic among the Muslim people can still be found in Noakhali today.

Its strong folk tradition dates back several centuries. During colonial rule, Irish linguist George Abraham Grierson collected two Noakhali folk poems; one from the island of Hatia, which is off the coast of the Noakhali mainland, and another from Ramganj, presently in Lakshmipur District. The Portuguese merchants and Roman Catholic missionaries who settled in Noakhali adopted the local language as late as the 1920s.

In December 2019, a mass demonstration was organised by some Noakhali's activists in Maijdee in response to a private television channel airing the Noakhali Bibhag Chai (We Want Noakhali Division) comical drama. They considered the drama to be an insult to the regional language, history and tradition of Noakhali district.

== Status and usage ==
Noakhali has no formal recognition or use in courts or in the legislature like the existent standard Bangla. The educated, elite, political and influential groups of Bangladesh bearing Noakhali homogeneity, usually prefer Standard Bengali for their wider communication. They generally use Noakhali only for communication with other Noakhali-speakers.

The usage of Noakhali is now in decline as more and more families of Noakhali are opting to raise their children to speak in Standard Bengali due to it being the official medium in the country and the negative stereotypes relating to Noakhali district held by other parts of Bengal. It is often becoming the case that Generation Z urban Noakhali-speakers cannot speak in Noakhali though it is commonly spoken by their grandparents in their homes. In contrast to speakers of Chittagonian and Sylheti, it is reported that some speakers of Noakhali feel a linguistic inferiority complex. Sultana, Dovchin and Pennycook have also highlighted the stigmatisation of Noakhali-speakers within Bangladeshi society.

== Classification ==
Grierson (1903) grouped the language of Noakhali under Southeastern Bengali dialects, alongside the languages of Chittagong and Rohingya. Chatterji (1926) places Noakhali in the south-eastern Vanga group of dialects and notes that all Bengali varieties were independent of each other and did not emanate from the historical literary register of Bengali called "Sadhu bhasha". Along with other Eastern Bengali languages, Noakhali has developed phonetic and morphological characteristics that are not present in western dialects of Bengali. Linguist Dr. Muhammad Shahidullah placed Noakhali under the Prachya branch as opposed to the Pashchatya branch of Bengali. By referring to this classification, linguist Paresh Chandra Majumder (1992) placed Noakhali under the "Purbadeshi" division of the Prachya (Vangiya) branch, the other branch being Pashchatya(Gourhi). According to Dr.Muhammad Shahidullah, the Noakhali language is a result of the fusion of other Bengali varieties of that region.

== Geographical distribution ==
Noakhali is the primary language variety of Greater Noakhali which today comprises the Bangladeshi districts of Noakhali, Feni and Lakshmipur, and some parts of the sub-district of Hajiganj. It is also spoken by the Bengali Hindus in the southern part of India's Tripura state, specifically in some parts of the South Tripura district. In this district, along with Standard Bengali, it serves as a lingua franca among some indigenous communities such as the Tripuri/Reang, the Chakma and the Mog/Marma. Mainland Noakhali is mutually intelligible with the neighbouring Sandwipi dialect, which is an isolated sub-dialect of the Eastern Bengali dialect spoken in Greater Dhaka region. Some have stated that Noakhali is unintelligible to the Dinajpur dialect of extreme northern Bengal.

Before and after the Partition of India, Noakhali-speaking Bengali Hindus from Greater Noakhali migrated to West Bengal, Assam and Tripura also. Outside of the subcontinent, the largest diaspora population from Noakhali reside in Europe (most notably Italy) and North America. Significant Noakhali-speaking Bengali diaspora population reside in the Middle East of which most are migrant workers, and in many other countries throughout the world.

== Features and lexical comparison ==
Noakhali is an Eastern Indo-Aryan language with a large amount of Persian and Hindustani vocabulary.

=== Comparison ===
| English | Standard Bengali | Noakhali | Notes |
|---|---|---|---|
| Boy/Son | Chhele (ছেলে) | hola/hut (হোলা/হুত) | |
| Water | Panī (পানি) | hãni (হাঁনি) | |
| Listen | Shon (শোন)~Shun (শুন) | hon (হোন)~hun (হুন) | |
| What | Ki (কী) | kiya (কীয়া) | |
| All | Shôkôl (সকল), Bebak (বেবাক) | beggun (বেগগুন) | From bebak-gulin (বেবাক-গুলিন) |
| Chicken | Murgi (মুরগি), kũkr̥a (কুঁকড়া) | kur̥a (কুড়া) | debuccalised from the earlier kũkr̥a (কুঁকড়া) |
| Papaya | Pepe (পেঁপে) | hãbia (হাঁবিয়া) | |
| Calcutta | Kolkata (কলকাতা) | koilkatta (কইলকাত্তা) | |
| Big | Bôṛo (বড়), Bôḍḍo (বড্ড) | bôḍḍa (বড্ডা) | |
| Egg | Ḍim (ডিম), bôyda (বয়দা) | Bôyza (বয়জা) | From Arabic: بيضة, romanized: bayḍah |
| Mischief | shôytani (শয়তানী) | Khônnashi (খন্নাশি) | From Arabic: خناس, romanized: khannās |
| to Lie down | Shuye poṛa (শুয়ে পড়া) | hota (হোতা) | |
| Friend | Bôndhu (বন্ধু), dost(o) (দোস্ত), iyar (ইয়ার) | bondu (বন্ধু), dost(o) (দোস্ত), eyar (এয়ার) | |
| He phoned me | She amake phon kôrechilô (সে আমাকে ফোন করেছিল) | hẽte ãre hon kôirchilô (হেতে আঁরে হোন কইরছিল) | |
| Shall not allow to do | Kôrte debô na (করতে দেব না) | Kôirtam ditam nô (কইরতাম দিতাম নো) | |
| I think it is 5 o'clock | Amar mône hôy pãchṭa baje (আমার মনে হয় পাঁচটা বাজে) | ãr mônôy hãsta baijje (আঁর মনয় হাঁচটা বাইজ্জে), ãtlai hãsṭaijjai (আঁতলাই হাঁচটাইজ্জাই) | |

== Phonology ==
The most notable feature distinguishing it from Standard Bengali and other Indo-Aryan languages is that the /p/ sound in those languages sometimes corresponds to /h/ in Noakhali. An example is the Bengali word for water (pāni) which is hãni in Noakhali. Another notable characteristic is the presence of the /x/ sound, which is not found in Standard Bengali.

A recurring feature is syllable simplification. One study argues that Noakhali favors simple syllable structures, especially CV, CVC, VC and occasionally V, and that more complex clusters are resolved through cluster-breaking processes.

=== Consonants ===
| | | Labial | Dental/ Alveolar | Retroflex | Palatal | Velar | Glottal |
|---|---|---|---|---|---|---|---|
| Stop | voiceless | p | t̪ | ʈ | c | k | |
| Stop | voiced | b | d̪ | ɖ | ɟ | ɡ | |
| Fricative | voiceless | f | s | | ʃ | x | h |
| Fricative | voiced | | z | | | | ɦ |
| Nasal | | m | n | | | ŋ | |
| Trill/Tap | | | ɾ~r | ɽ | | | |
| Approximant | lateral | | l | | | | |
| Approximant | central | (w) | | | j | | |

Noakhali language is marked by a reduction or loss of aspiration and by systematic consonantal alternations. In the Chatkhil variety, aspirated stops in Standard Colloquial Bengali frequently appear as unaspirated stops, with forms such as /bʱ/ realized as [b], /tʱ/ as [t], /dʱ/ as [d], and /kʱ/ as [k]; in some environments, /pʱ/ may surface as [h]. The same study also reports additional consonantal correspondences, including /ʃ/ realized as [r] or [h], /c/ as [ɔ], and /s/ as [c], indicating substantial divergence from Standard Colloquial Bengali in the consonant system.

=== Vowels ===
| | Front | Central | Back |
|---|---|---|---|
| High | i | | u |
| High-mid | e | | o |
| Low-mid | | | ɔ |
| Low | æ | a | |

Vocalic variation is likewise prominent. The Noakhali language show patterns of vowel lowering and raising, including /i/ realized as a lower front vowel in some contexts, /e/ appearing as [a] or schwa-like variants, /o/ shifting to [a], and /u/ surfacing as [o] or, in some positions, [i]. It also notes a reduction in nasalized vowels, whereas Standard Bengali is described as having seven nasalized vowels, the Chatkhil data show only four nasalized oral-vowel counterparts, with nasalization absent in some forms.

== Variations ==
There are some differences of Noakhali dialects in accent, spoken in different parts of the Greater Noakhali region. In the Linguistic Survey of India, conducted in the early 20th century, the Irish linguist George Abraham Grierson used the phrase a man had two sons to show dialectic diversity of Bengali language in Bengal region.

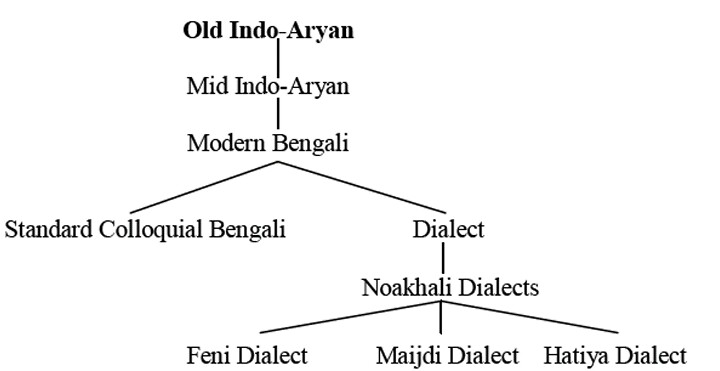
The Origin and Variations of the Noakhali Language

- Central Bengali: ækjon manusher duţi chhele chhilo.
- Noakhali of Feni-Chhagalnaiya: ijja maincher tun duga hut/hola asil.
- Noakhali of Ramganj-Chatkhil: ogga mainsher tun duga hut asil.
- Noakhali of Hatiya: egga mainsher dugga hola asil.

== Grammar ==
Abul Kalam Manzur Morshed's 1972 M.A. thesis at the University of British Columbia states that the Noakhali language differs from Standard Colloquial Bengali at the phonological, morphological and lexical levels. However, it notes that the overall syntactic structure remains largely similar, with the most significant differences occurring in phonology and morphology. The study adopts a generative and contrastive approach, with particular emphasis on gemination as well as vocalic and consonantal alternation.

Studies on phonetics and sound change include analyses based on the Chatkhil variety of Noakhali, which represents a variety within the broader Greater Noakhali region. Research on prosody and morphological structure is mainly drawn from studies published in 2013 and 2021. An earlier descriptive source is Gopal Haldar's 1933 work A Skeleton Grammar of the Noakhali Dialect of Bengali, which indicates that the language had already been subject to grammatical description in earlier linguistic literature.

=== Pronouns ===
==== Personal pronouns ====
Noakhali personal pronouns are somewhat similar to English pronouns, having different words for first, second, and third person, and also for singular and plural (unlike for verbs, below). Noakhali pronouns, like their English counterparts, do differentiate for gender. In addition, each of the second and third-person pronouns have different forms for the familiar and polite forms; the second person also has a "very familiar" form (sometimes called "despective"). It may be noted that the "very familiar" form is used when addressing particularly close friends or family as well as for addressing subordinates, or in abusive language. In the following tables, the abbreviations used are as follows: VF=very familiar, F=familiar, and P=polite (honor); H=here, T=there, E=elsewhere (proximity), and I=inanimate.

The nominative case is used for pronouns that are the subject of the sentence, such as "I already did that" or "Will you please stop making that noise?"

Personal pronouns (nominative case)
| Subject | Honor | Singular | Plural |
|---|---|---|---|
| 1 | | আঁই (Ãi, I) | আমরা (amra, we) |
| 2 | VF | তুই (tui, you) | তোরা (tura, you) |
| 2 | F | তুঁই (tũi, you) | তোমরা (tomra, you) |
| 2 | P | আম্নে/আন্নে (amne/anne, you) | আম্নেরা/আন্নেরা (amnera/annera, you) |
| 3 | F | হেতে (hete, he), হেতি (heti, she) | হেতেরা (hetera, they m.), হেতিরা (hetira, they f.) |
| 3 | P | হেতেন (heten, he), হেতিন (hetin, she) | হেতেনরা (hetenra, they m.), হেতিনরা (hetinra, they f.) |
| 3 | I | হেই/হিয়েন (hei/hiyen, it) | হিগুন/হিগিন/হিগুলি/হিগাইন (higun/higin/higuli/higain, these) |

The possessive case is used to show possession, such as "Where is your coat?" or "Let's go to our house". In addition, sentences such as "I have a book" (আঁর বই আছে) or "I need money" (আঁর টিয়া দরকার) also use the possessive (the literal translation of the Standard Bengali versions of these sentences would be "There is my book" and "There is my need for money" respectively).

Personal pronouns (possessive case)
| Subject | Honor | Singular | Plural |
|---|---|---|---|
| 1 | | আঁর (Ãr, my) | আঙ্গো (ango, our) |
| 2 | VF | তোর (tor, your) | তোগো (togo, your) |
| 2 | F | তোঁয়ার (tõar, your) | তোঁগো (tõgo, your) |
| 2 | P | আম্নের/আন্নের (amner/anner, your) | আম্নেগো/আন্নেগো (amnego/annego, your) |
| 3 | F | হেতের (heter, his), হেতির (hetir, her) | হেতেগো (hetego, their m.), হেতিগো (hetigo, their f.) |
| 3 | P | হেতেনের (hetener, his), হেতিনের (hetiner, her) | হেতেনগো (hetengo, their m.), হেতিনগো (hetingo, their f.) |
| 3 | I | হিয়ার/হিয়েনের (hiyar/hiyener, its) | হিগুনের (higuner, of those) |

== In popular culture ==
The Noakhali language has appeared in Bangladeshi television, film and music. The television serial Choita Pagol used the Noakhali dialect throughout, and the version used in the serial was simplified for general audiences to understand. Joya Ahsan learned the Noakhali language for her role in the serial.

An episode of Ityadi filmed in Maijdee included a special song in the Noakhali language, sung by Robi Chowdhury. Singer Oyshee recorded the title track of the film Mukti in the Noakhali language Md. Hashem's book Noakhalir Ancholic Gan contains hundreds of songs composed in the Noakhali language. "Ango Bari Noakhali Royal District Vai" is one of his notable songs.

Selim Al Deen's play Hat Hodai was written entirely in the Noakhali language and portrayed the lifestyle of people from remote areas of the Greater Noakhali region.

Thoansh is a book written in the Noakhali language. It is about the Noakhali language, written by expatriate Bangladeshi authors in Australia. It explores vocabulary, expressions and cultural elements of the language, along with its everyday use and gradual decline.

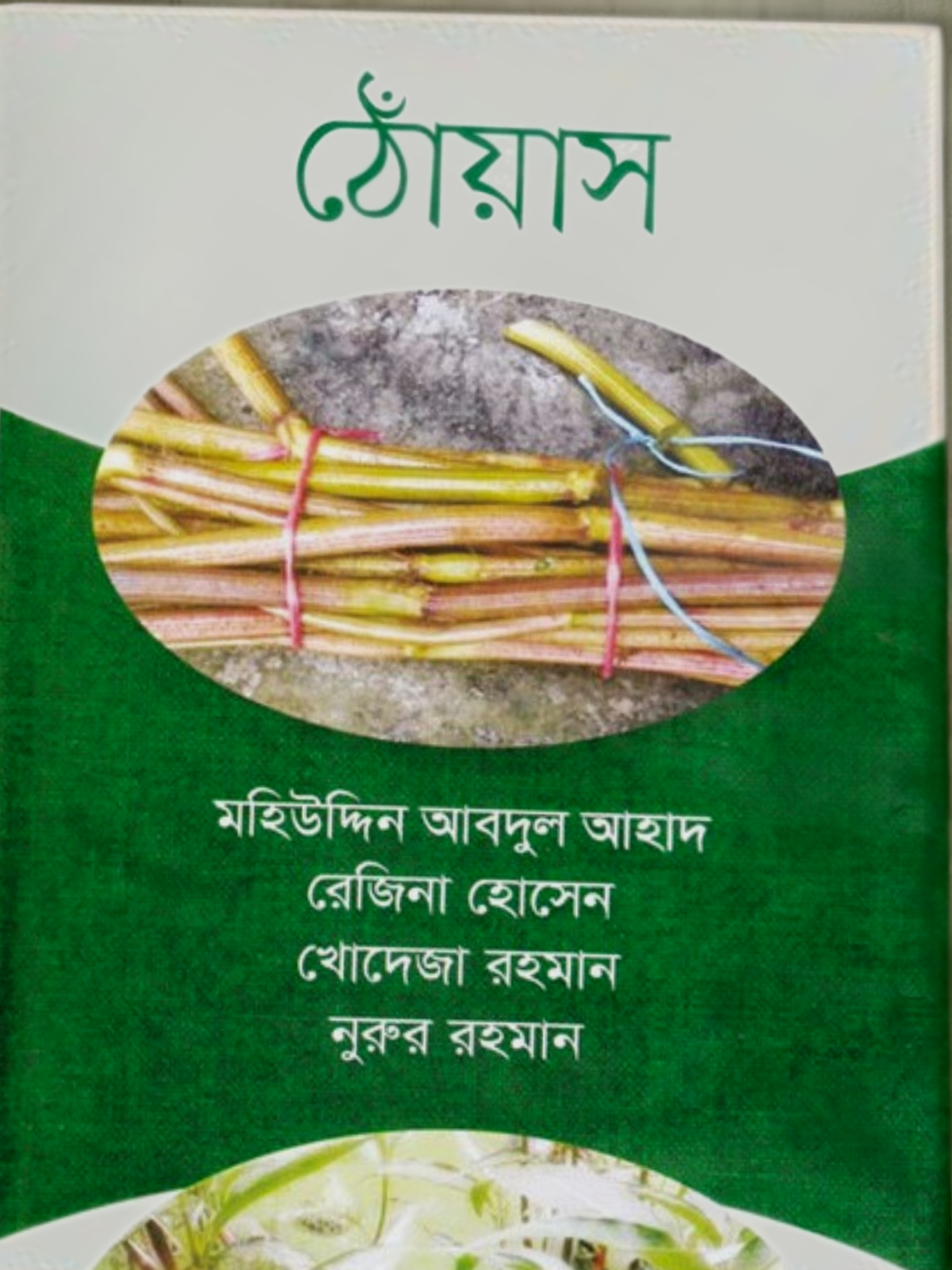
The cover of the book Thoansh

== Sample text ==
The following text is Article 1 of the Universal Declaration of Human Rights, written in Noakhali:

=== Romanisation ===
Bek mānush ijjot āzze hoker hisāibbe homāinnā oi foydā oy, etārgottē ākkol āzze bibek āzze, hillāi buli iggā ārigger loge bāyēr nān beboār koroṇ joruri.

=== Bengali-Assamese script ===
বেক মানুষ ইজ্জত আজ়্জ়ে হোকের হিসাইব্বে হোমাইন্যা ওই ফ়য়দা অয়, এতারগত্তে আক্কল আজ়্জ়ে বিবেক আজ়্জ়ে, হিল্লাই বুলি ইগ্গা আরিগ্গার লগে বাইয়ের নান বেবোয়ার করণ জরুরি।

=== English ===
All human beings are born free and equal in dignity and rights. They are endowed with reason and conscience and should act towards one another in a spirit of brotherhood.

== Bibliography ==
- Chatterji, Suniti Kumar (1926). The Origin and Development of the Bengali Language. Calcutta University Press.
- Grierson, G A, ed. (1903). Linguistic Survey of India: Indo-Aryan Family Eastern Group. Vol. V.
- Haldār, Gopāla (1933). A Skeleton Grammar of the Noakhali Dialect of Bengali. Calcutta University Press. p. 38.
