= Sabar people =

Tribe from Odisha and Western Bengal, India

Sabara
Regions with significant populations
- West Bengal: 40,374
- Jharkhand: 9,688
- Bangladesh: 2,000

Languages
- Bengali (Note: According to 1961 Indian census, 91.8% Sabar returned their language as Bengali, while 8.1% as Munda); Munda; Lodhi

Religion
- Majority; Hinduism; Minority: Buddhism • Animism • Christianity • Islam

Related ethnic groups
- Mundas, Ho, Santhal and other Mundari speaking people

The Sabar people (also Shabar and Saora) are a tribal community living mainly in southern West Bengal and Jharkhand in India. During the colonial period, they were classed as one of the 'criminal tribes' under Criminal Tribes Act 1871, and suffer from social stigma and ostracism in modern times. There are small communities of Sabar people in Bangladesh.

Also known as Saora, the Sabar tribe finds mention in the Hindu epic Mahabharata, while in some parts of East Singhbhum district mainly in Musabani, they are known as Kariya. Noted writer and activist Mahasweta Devi is known for working with these forest tribals.

This reclusive tribe is found primarily in parts of Jharkhand and in Midnapore District of West Bengal.

== History ==
The traditionally forest-dwelling tribe lack experience in agriculture, and rely on the forests for their livelihood. In recent years, with the spread of the Naxalite rebellion in the area, the police often restrict their access to the forest. In 2004, five persons in the Sabar village of Amlasole, in Midnapore district, died after several months of starvation, leading to a national media furore. Subsequently, Durbar Mahila Samanway Committee (DMSC) started a school in the area, funded partially by sex workers from Kolkata.

In June 2008, the Sabar suffered severe flooding in many of their West Bengal villages, and then received large amounts of aid from Catholic missionaries.

Hundreds of Sabars migrated to present-day Bangladesh during the colonial period to work as tea garden labourers. Today, there are around 2000 of them residing in the northeastern district of Moulvibazar, in areas such as Nandarani, Harinchhara and Rajghat.

In Gplot which is in Sundarbans, under Patharpratima block which is in South 24 parganas it has been observed that there is presence of Sabars, who have migrated from Midnapore district of West Bengal. Currently there are 2500-3000 people of Sabar community residing there.

== Language ==
Most of the Sabars in West Bengal speak Bengali as their first language and some speak Munda and Lodhi languages.

== Sources ==
- Sabar tribe in Sabar Nagar, Jamshedpur district
