= Bishnupriya Manipuri =

Indo-Aryan language spoken in India and Bangladesh

- বিষ্ণুপ্রিয়া মণিপুরী, বিষ্ণুপ্রিয়া মৈতৈ, বিষ্ণুপ্রিয়া, মায়াং, ইমার ঠার
- "Bishnupriya Manipuri" and "Bishnupriya Meitei" in Bengali-Assamese script
- Pronunciation: [biʃnuprija mɔnipuri] [biʃnuprija mejtej] [biʃnuprija] [majaŋ] [i.maɾ ʈʰaɾ]
- Region: Primarily Northeast India and Bangladesh
- Ethnicity: Bishnupriyas
- Native speakers: 119,646 total speakers: 79,646 in India; 53,812 in Assam; 21,242 in Tripura; 1,457 in Manipur; 40,000 in Bangladesh (2003–2011)
- Language family: Indo-European: Indo-Iranian; Indo-Aryan; Eastern; Bengali–Assamese; Bishnupriya Manipuri
- Early form: Magadhi Prakrit
- Writing system: Bengali-Assamese script

Language codes
- ISO 639-3: bpy
- Glottolog: bish1244
- ELP: Bishnupuriya

Bishnupriya Manipuri, also known as Bishnupriya Meitei,, Mayang,, Imar Thar or simply as Bishnupriya, (Note: The census data as well as the Ethnologue record the name as "Bishnupriya" and not "Bishnupriya Manipuri".) is an Indo-Aryan lect belonging to the Bengali–Assamese linguistic sub-branch. It is a creole of the Bengali language and the Meitei language (also called Manipuri language) and still retains its pre-Bengali features.

It is spoken in parts of the Indian states of Assam, Tripura, and Manipur, as well as in the Sylhet Division of Bangladesh, and uses the Bengali-Assamese script as its writing system. Bishnupriya Manipuri is a member of the Eastern Indo-Aryan languages and evolved from Magadhi Prakrit; hence its origin is associated with the Magadha realm.

The Government of Tripura categorised Bishnnupriya Manipuri under the "Tribal Language Cell" of the State Council of Educational Research and Training.

Its speakers are given the "Other Backward Classes" status by the Assam Government and there is no legal status of the Bishnupriyas in Manipur. In the 2020s, Bishnupriya-speaking people started demanding that the Assam Government should give them the status of "indigenous people" of Assam and treat them the same as other indigenous communities of the state.

The Bishnupriya-speaking people in Bangladesh use Meitei language as their second language (L2).

According to Sahitya Akademi honorary fellow British linguist Ronald E. Asher and Christopher Moseley, Bishnupriya is a mixed language spoken by former Bengali immigrants, with substantial Meithei lexicon but basically Bengali structure and reduced morphology. According to linguist and historian Andrew Dalby, Bishnupriya (also known as "Mayang") is historically a form of the Bengali language once current in Manipur. According to American linguist David Bradley's research works published by the Department of Linguistics, Research School of Pacific and Asian Studies in the Australian National University, Bishnupriya is spoken by former Bengali subjects, with some Manipuri lexicon and reduced morphology.

== History and development ==
The shades of yellow show the linguistic map of Eastern Indo-Aryan languages, the family where Bishnupriya belongs to.

Bishnupriya is a member of the Māgadhan languages (Eastern Indo-Aryan languages), having origin associated with Magadha. Bishnupriya is one of the Bengali–Assamese languages

KP Sinha, who has done considerable research on Bishnupriya Manipuri, disagrees with the theory of Bishnupriya being associated with the Manipur (Mahabharata) and is of the opinion that the language originated from Magadhi Prakrit. In his opinion, the language has retained dominant characteristics of Magadhi. According to Sinha, pronouns and declensional and conjugational endings seem to be same as or closely related to those of Maithili, Oriya and Bengali. These forms of Oriya, Bengali, etc. are in part derived from Magadhi Apabhramsa coming from the Magadhi Prakrita.

However, the Bishnupriya Manipuri language is not one of the Tibeto-Burman languages, but is closer to the Indo-Aryan group of languages with remarkable influence from Meitei both grammatically and phonetically. At a different stage of development of the language the Sauraseni, Maharashtri and Magadhi languages and the Tibeto-Burman languages exerted influence on it as well. So it was probably developed from Sanskrit, Sauraseni-Maharashtri Prakrit and Magadhi Prakrita. The Sauraseni-Maharastri relation can be traced by observing some characteristics of pronouns. The Magadhi element is also remarkable, as the language retains many characteristics of Magadhi.

== Conflict of classification as a dialect of Bengali and Assamese ==
Several scholars and linguists opine Bishnupriya as a dialect of Bengali language, while many opine it is a dialect of the Assamese language. Many scholars opine that Bishnupriya is a creole language (mixed language) of Bengali language and Meitei language, retaining its pre-Bengali features in present times.

Bishnupriya is greatly influenced by Meitei (a Tibeto-Burman language) and other Indo-Aryan languages, including Assamese and Bengali to a great extent.

=== Bishnupriya as a dialect of Bengali ===
Padma Vibhushan–awardee Indian linguist Suniti Kumar Chatterji, who is also a recognised Bengali phonetician, listed Bishnupriya to be a dialect of Bengali.

According to Padma Shri–awardee Indian scholar Ningthoukhongjam Khelchandra, "Bishnupriya" is a fragmented Bengali Hindu community, originally native to Assam-Bengal trans-border areas. When they migrated and lived in Bishnupur, Manipur (formerly known as "Lamangdong"), they were known as "Bishnupuriyas", and later corrupted as "Bishnupriyas". Ethnolinguistically, they are Bengalis. Unlike the large number of Assamese-Bengali immigrants in Manipur being assimilated into Meitei ethnicity until the 18th century, they remain un-assimilated.

=== Bishnupriya as a Bengali-Meitei creole ===
According to American scholar William Frawley, Bishnupriya was once a creole language of Bengali and Meitei and it still retains its pre-Bengali features. American linguist and professor Colin Masica is of the same opinion.

According to Shobhana Chelliah, Bishnupriya Manipuri is a mixed language spoken by former Bengali immigrants, having significant amount of Meitei lexicons. Bishnupriya still retains its basic Bengali structural and morphological features.

=== Bishnupriya as a dialect of Assamese ===
Several Irish and Indian linguists and scholars including George Abraham Grierson, Maheswar Neog and Banikanta Kakati consider Bishnupriya a dialect of Assamese.

According to the Linguistic Survey of India led by Grierson, "Bishnupriya" alias "Mayang" (Code no. 555) is a dialect of Assamese (Code no. 552).

== Meitei elements in Bishnupriya ==
Bishnupriya has 4000 borrowed root words from Meitei language. Bishnupriya Manipuri retains the old 18 sounds of Meitei. Of them, there were three vowels, such as ɑ, i and u, thirteen consonants such as p, t, k, pʰ, tʰ, kʰ, c͡ʃ, m, n, ŋ, l, ʃ, h and two semi-vowels, such as w and j. Nine more sounds were later added to Meitei, but Bishnupriya is not concerned with them because the Bishnupriyas left Manipur during the first part of the 19th century. That is why Bishnupriya Manipuri retains the older sounds of Meitei, whereas in Meitei itself the sound system has undergone various changes.

== Vocabulary ==
Like other Indic languages, the core vocabulary of Bishnupriya Manipuri is made up of tadbhava words (i.e. words inherited over time from older Indic languages, including Sanskrit, including many historical changes in grammar and pronunciation), although thousands of tatsama words (i.e. words that were re-borrowed directly from Sanskrit with little phonetic or grammatical change) augment the vocabulary greatly. In addition, many other words were borrowed from languages spoken in the region either natively or as a colonial language, including Meitei, English, and Perso-Arabic.

- Inherited/native Indic words (tadbhava): 10,000 (Of these, 2,000 are only found in Bishnupriya Manipuri, and have not been inherited by other Indic languages)
- Words re-borrowed from Sanskrit (tatsama): 10,000
- Words re-borrowed from Sanskrit, partially modified (ardhatatsama): 1,500
- Words borrowed from Meitei: 4000
- Words borrowed from other indigenous non-Indic languages (desi): 1,500
- Words borrowed from Perso-Arabic: 2,000
- Words borrowed from English: 700
- Hybrid words: 1,000
- Words of obscure origin: 1,300
