= Eastern Indo-Aryan languages =

Language family of South Asia

Eastern Indo-Aryan
- Magadhan
- Geographic distribution: Eastern India, Bangladesh, southern Nepal
- Linguistic classification: Indo-European: Indo-Iranian; Indo-Aryan; Eastern Indo-Aryan
- Early forms: Prakrit: Magadhi Prakrit
- Subdivisions: Bengali–Assamese; Bihari; Halbic; Odia

Language codes
- Glottolog: indo1323 Indo-Aryan Eastern zone biha1245 Bihari
- Major Indo-Aryan languages of South Asia; Bengali-Assamese Bihari Odia Halbic

The Eastern Indo-Aryan languages, also known as Māgadhan languages, are spoken throughout the eastern region of the Indian subcontinent, which includes Bihar, Uttar Pradesh, Jharkhand, Bengal region, Tripura, Assam, and Odisha; alongside other regions surrounding the northeastern Himalayan corridor. Bengali is official language of Bangladesh and the state of West Bengal, Tripura and the Barak Valley of Assam while Assamese and Odia are the official languages of Assam and Odisha, respectively. The Eastern Indo-Aryan languages descend from Abahattha, which descends from Magadhan Apabhraṃśa and ultimately from Magadhi Prakrit.

== Classification ==
The exact scope of the Eastern branch of the Indo-Aryan languages is controversial. All scholars agree about a kernel that includes the Odia cluster and the Bengali–Assamese languages, while many also include the Bihari languages. The widest scope was proposed by Suniti Kumar Chatterji who included the Eastern Hindi varieties, but this has not been widely accepted.

When the Bihari languages are included, the Eastern Indo-Aryan languages fall into four language groups in two broader categories:

=== Western Magadhan ===
- Bihari
  - Bhojpuri
    - Caribbean Hindustani
    - Fiji Hindi
    - Sarnami
    - Mauritian Bhojpuri
  - Magahi
    - Khortha
  - Maithili
    - Bajjika (Western Maithili)
    - Angika (Southern Maithili)
    - Central Maithili
    - Eastern Maithili
    - Thēthi
    - Jolaha
    - Kisan
  - Sadanic
    - Nagpuri
    - Kurmali (Panchpargania)
  - Unclassified Bihari
    - Tharuic
      - Chitwania Tharu
      - Dangaura Tharu
        - Dangaha
      - Sonha
      - Kathariya Tharu
      - Kochila Tharu
        - Western Kochila
        - Central Kochila (Saptariya Tharu)
        - Eastern Kochila (Morangiya, Khawas Tharu)
      - Rana Tharu
      - Buksa
      - Musasa
    - Majhi
    - Kumhali
    - Kuswaric
      - Danwar
        - Dewas Done Danuwar
          - Dewas Rai
          - Done Danuwar
        - Kochariya-East Danuwar
          - East Danuwar
          - Kochariya
      - Bote-Darai
        - Bote
        - Darai

=== Eastern Magadhan ===
- Bengali–Assamese:
  - Gauda-Banga
    - Bengali
      - Vanga (Eastern Bengali)
        - Dhakaiya Kutti Bengali
        - Mymensinghi Bengali
        - Dobhashi Bengali
        - Christian Bengali
      - Manbhumi (Western Bengali)
      - Rarhi (Central Bengali)
        - Chôlitô Bhāṣā
        - Sādhu Bhāṣā
      - Sundarbani (Southern Bengali)
      - Varendri (North-Central Bengali)
    - Bishnupriya Manipuri
    - Chakma
    - Chittagonian
    - Kurmukar
    - Noakhali
    - Rohingya
    - Sylheti
    - Tanchangya
    - Thar
  - Kamarupic:
    - Eastern Kamarupi
      - Assamese
        - Eastern Assamese
        - Central Assamese
        - Kamrupi (Western Assamese)
        - Dehan (Southern Assamese)
      - Nagamese
      - Nefamese
    - Intermediate Kamarupi
      - Goalpariya (Eastern)
    - Western Kamarupi
      - KRDS lects
        - Kayort
        - Rangpuri
        - Surjapuri
        - Goalpariya (Western)
        - Rajbanshi
      - Hajong
- Odia languages
  - Odia
    - Baleswari (Northern Odia)
    - Singhbhumi (Southern Jharkhandi Odia)
    - Kataki (Central Odia)
    - Sundargadi (Northwestern Odia)
    - Kalahandia (Southwestern Odia)
    - Ganjami (Southern Odia)
  - Bodo Parja
  - Bhatri
  - Desia
  - Reli
  - Sambalpuri
  - Kupia
- Halbic:
  - Halbi
    - Adkuri
    - Bastari
    - Chandari
    - Gachikolo
    - Govari
    - Kawari
    - Kunbi
    - Mahari
    - Muri
    - Sundi
  - Kamar
  - Bhunjia
  - Nahari
  - Mirgan

== Features ==
Grammatical features of the Eastern Indo-Aryan languages:

Case	Bengali	Assamese	Odia	Rajbangshi	Surjapuri	Maithili	Bhojpuri	Tharu	Sylheti
Instrumental	-t̪e, -ke d̪ie	-e, -er-e, di, -e-di	-e, -re, -d̪ei	-d̪i	sɛ	-e,e˜, sə˜, d̪ea		le, leka	-re, di
Dative	-ke, -re	-k, -ɒk	-ku	-k, -ɔk	-k, -ɔk	-ke˜	-ke	-hənə	-gu, -gur
Ablative	-t̪ʰeke	-pɒra	-u, -ru, -ʈʰaru, -ʈʰiru	-hat̪ɛ, t̪ʰaki	-sɛ	-sə˜, -k -karəne		se	-lagi, -tône
Genitive	-r, -er	-r, -ɒr	-rɔ	-r, -ɛr	-r, -ɛr	-ker (-k)	-kæ	-ək	-r, -ôr
Locative	-e, -t̪e	-t, -ɒt	-re	-t̪, -ɔt̪	-t̪, -ɔt̪	e, me, -hi, -tə		-mə	-t, -ô

Eastern Indo-Aryan languages display many morphosyntactic features similar to those of Munda languages, while western Indo-Aryan languages do not. It is suggested that "pre-Munda" ("proto-" in regular terminology) languages may have once dominated the eastern Indo-Gangetic Plain, and were then absorbed by Indo-Aryan languages at an early date as Indo-Aryan spread east.
