= Lodhi language =

Indo-Aryan language of India

Lodhi
- Sabar, Sabara
- ସାବାର
- Native to: India
- Region: Odisha, West Bengal, Jharkhand
- Ethnicity: Lodha
- Native speakers: 139,000 (2011); 22% of ethnic population
- Language family: Indo-European: Indo-Iranian; Indo-Aryan; Eastern; Bengali-Assamese; Lodhi
- Writing system: Devanagri Script

Language codes
- ISO 639-3: lbm
- Glottolog: lodh1246

Lodhi (Lodi, Lohi, Lozi) is an Indo-Aryan language spoken in India. Ethnologue notes high levels of lexical similarity (50–75%) with Oriya, Bengali and Kharia Thar which is spoken only by one quarter of ethnic Lodhi in Orissa. However, while admitting that Lodhi is related to Sora, a Munda language, Ethnologue also classifies Lodhi as an Indic (Bengali–Assamese) language and it is considered a variety of Hindi in the Indian census. It may be that there are both Munda and Indic varieties subsumed under the name Lodhi.

However, Anderson (2008:299) suggests that Lodhi (Lodha) of northern Orissa may be an Indo-Aryan lect rather than endangered Munda language; some members use the autonym Sabar or Sabara.

== Locations ==
Lodhi is spoken in:

- Morada and Suliapada, Sadar subdivision, Mayurbhanj district, Odisha
- Sora block, Balasore district, Odisha
- Binpur and Kharagpur-I blocks in West Medinipur district, West Bengal
- Jharkhand (along the West Bengal border)

== Status ==
Since the Lodha live in multilingual communities in frequent contact with peoples such as the Kharia, Bengali and Bhumij almost all Lodha are bilingual and can speak Bengali. In addition to bilingualism the multilingualism of the Lodha means that the Lodhi language is only used within the home or amongst the tribe. The Lodhi language is declining as now most of its speakers are elderly with the younger population switching to Bengali.

The Lodhi language is neither a subject nor a medium of instruction in any of the schools. It is not used in the judicial or in government system. In the religious and cultural ceremonies, the Lodhi language is sparingly used. Instead of Lodha Bengali is used instead.

Lodhi is a mostly unwritten language but when it needs to be written the Devanagari script is used.

== Phonology ==
=== Consonants ===
		Bilabial	Alveolar	Retroflex	Palatal	Velar	Glottal
Stop	voiceless	p	t	ʈ	c	k	ʔ
Stop	aspirated	pʰ	tʰ	ʈʰ	cʰ	kʰ	
Stop	voiced	b	d	ɖ	ɟ	ɡ	
Stop	aspirated	bʰ	dʰ	ɖʰ	ɟʰ	gʰ	
Fricative			s				ɦ
Nasal		m	n	ɳ		ŋ	
Approximant		w	l	ɭ	ʎ		
Flap			ɾ				

=== Vowels ===
	Front	Central	Back
Close	i		u
Mid	e		o
Open		a	
Diphthong	/eu, oi, ua, ui/		

All phonemes can occur in either the beginning, middle, or the end of a world.

The 4 diphthongs that are used are: /eu/ /oi/ /ua/ /ui/.

== Morphology ==
The lexicon of Lodhi is divided into 2 groups: the vast majority of words are in the first group which is made up of predicates, complements of predicates and as modifiers, and a second smaller group which serves to indicate things like tense, person, and number.

=== Nouns ===
Nouns in Lodhi are distinguished by grammatical number, grammatical gender, and case; and can only be used at the head of a predicate phrase. They are divided by animacy into two groups: animate, and inanimate; animate nouns include words like Lebuki (persons) and biloiki (cats) while inanimate nouns are words like daru (stone).

==== Number ====
Words in Lodhi are divided by three types of number: singular, dual, and plural. Singular words are unmarked, dual words are marked with the suffix -kiyar, and plural words are marked with the suffix -ki.

	Lodhi	English
Singular	lebu	man
Dual	lebukiyar	two men
Plural	lebuki	men

The dual can also be used in combination with a personal name refers to that person and a person who is related to him or her in some fashion, usually by marriage; while the plural is also often found to denote approximation between two things.

==== Gender ====
Lodhi does not have grammatical gender but it does have natural gender where words for things which have a gender use either use a word with the gender within the definition ex. konselu (woman) and kõpuu (man), or the suffix -ay can be added to make a word from its female version to its male version ex. saw (husband) vs. saway (wife). Inanimate objects do not have any gender associated with them.

==== Case ====
Lodhi has 3 cases: nominative, locative, and possessive.

Nominative is unmarked ex. dʰaru (tree), bi:or (jungle)

Locative is marked with the suffix -te ex. oʔ (house) oʔte (in the house)

Possessive is marked with 1 of 3 suffixes depending on the grammatical person of the possession

	Lodhi	example	English
1st Person	-im	emga'im	my mother
2nd person	-m	emgam	your mother
3rd Person	-te	emgate	his mother

==== Postpositions ====
There are many postposition in Lodhi with the most popular being.

Lodhi	English
bahart	outside of
mugamte	in front of
kunabte	behind
toblute	on top of, above
mo jhite	amidst, among
tutate	under, below

=== Adjectives ===
Adjectives in Lodhi are divided into 2 groups: simple adjectives and derived pronouns. Simple adjective are all mono-morphophonetic.

Derived adjectives are derived by adding either -i, -e, or -te to the end of a simple adjective to get a new adjective with a related but different definition. Examples include dhoa (smoky) vs. dhoate (smoky), mati (earth) vs. maite (early), and des (country) vs. desi (indigenous).

=== Verbs ===
In Lodhi the verbs ending in personal suffix are finite Verbs and those which do not end in personal suffix and which carry participle suffix or infinitive suffix are non-finite Verbs. Additionally the verbs contain aspect and/ or tense or imperative suffixes or the gerundial suffix.

==== Tense ====
There are four tenses in Lodhi: past, present, future, and continuous.

Past	-te
Present	-oʔ
Future	-e
Continuous	-j-

==== Mood ====
Imperative mood is only used in the second person and is marked via the infix -na- as in the word com (go) vs. conam (you go).

Perfect participle is marked via the suffix -kon ex. co (go) vs. cokon (having gone)

The infinitive is marked with the suffix -na ex. co vs. cona (to go)

==== Verbal Nouns ====
Verbal nous are formed are adding either the infix -ne- or -na- to a verb ex. dej (cut) denej (axe).

==== Causative Verbs ====
Causative Verbs are formed either by adding for the infix -b- for polysyllabic roots or by adding the prefix -ob- for monosyllabic roots ex. nog (eat) vs. obnog (feed) ex. remag (call) vs. rebmag (make it call).

==== Negative Verbs ====
Negative verbs have two markers those that go before non-imperative verbs use the prefix um- while those that go before Imperative verbs use the prefix ag- ex. in cona (I will go) vs unim cona (I won't go) ex. nok og (he ate) vs. umnok og (he didn't eat).

==== Compound Verbs ====
Compound verbs are formed by combining the two verbs being compounded ex. pad (jump) and paro (cross) > padparo (jump and cross).

==== Passive Formation ====
Passive formation is done by adding the suffix -dom to the verb root ex. yo (see) vs. yodom (seen).

=== Pronouns ===
		Singular	Dual	Plural
1st person	inclusive	im	anam	ampe
1st person	exclusive	im	imjar	ele
2nd person		am	ambar	ampe
3rd person		hokar	hokiyar	hoki
Interrogative		a kar	akiyar	N/A

There are two special interrogative pronouns a betu (which boy) and a lebu (which man).

== Sample text ==
Lodhi	English	Literal Translation
Iɡʰay kawaʔray buɳam ki taroʔmay	How crow hen killed the snake	how crowhen snake case marker killed
moɳ kinirte kisim kisim yaʔ kontheɖ ro hoɖom jiwjantu ki awnalaʔ kimay	In a forest lived many different types of birds and other animals	one forest + in different different types birds and other animals together live + case
moɳ kawaʔ ro sawray moɳ bara daɾu te awnalaʔki	One crow lived with its spouse in a big tree	one crow and spouse one big tree in lived
sadʰu ayo or aba dom ko moɳ gesulʔ bay siʔmay	The simple parents made a nes	simple parents one nest make tense personal marker

== Sources ==
- Anderson, Gregory D.S (ed). 2008. The Munda languages. Routledge Language Family Series 3.New York: Routledge. ISBN 0-415-32890-X.
