= Chittagonian language =

Language of parts of Bangladesh

Chittagonian
- Chittagonian Bengali
- চাটগাঁইয়া চিটাইঙ্গা
- The word "Saṭgãia" in the Bengali-Assamese script
- Pronunciation: [saŋʈgaiyaŋ] [siʈaiŋga]
- Native to: Bangladesh
- Region: Chittagong region
- Ethnicity: Bengali, Barua
- Native speakers: 13 million (2006) to 16 million (2007)
- Language family: Indo-European: Indo-Iranian; Indo-Aryan; Eastern; Bengali–Assamese; Gauda–Bangla; Southeastern Bengali; Chittagonian
- Writing system: Bengali–Assamese script (Bengali alphabet); Arabic; Latin

Language codes
- ISO 639-3: ctg
- Glottolog: chit1275
- Linguasphere: 73-DEE-aa
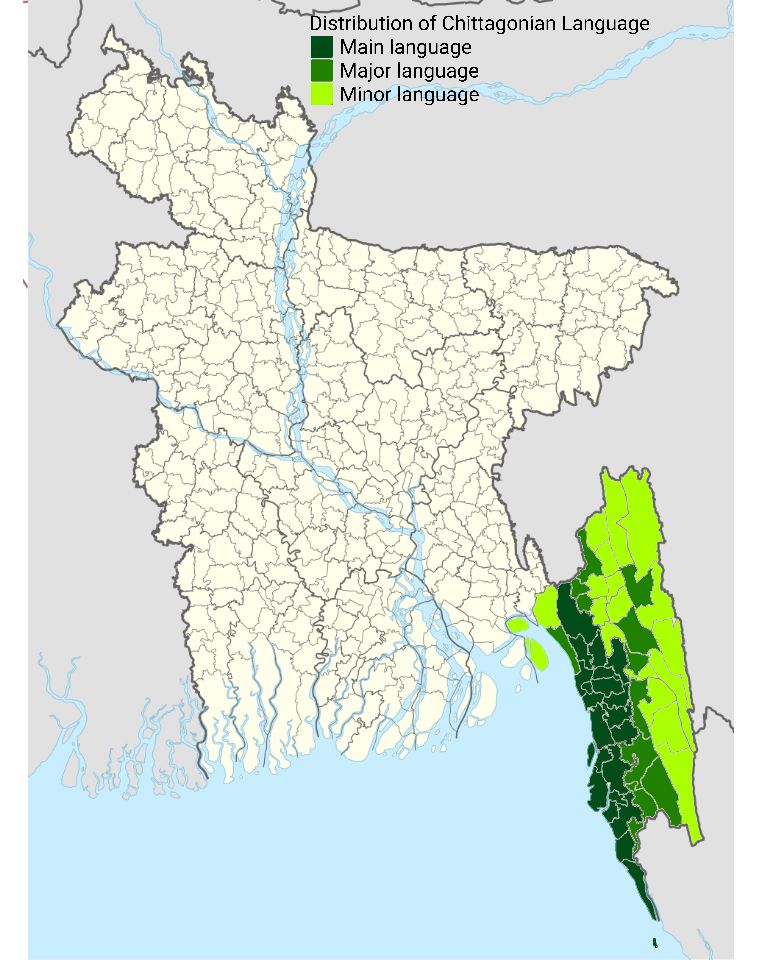
- Distribution of Chittagonian Language

Chittagonian (চাটগাঁইয়া saṭgãia or চিটাইঙ্গা siṭaiṅga) or Chittagonian Bengali is an Indo-Aryan language spoken in parts of the Greater Chittagong in Bangladesh. Chittagonian is not inherently intelligible to other varieties of Bengali, although it is variously considered as a nonstandard Bengali dialect. However, Chittagonian speakers can understand other regional Bengali dialects very well. Chittagonian is also considered to be a separate language by some linguists. While Chittagonian is linguistically distinct, its speakers identify with Bengali culture and the Standard Bengali language. It is broadly mutually intelligible with the Rohingya language and with a lesser extent to Noakhali and Chakma. It is estimated (2006) that Chittagonian has 13 million speakers, principally in Bangladesh.

== Classification ==
Chittagonian is a member of the Bengali-Assamese sub-branch of the Eastern group of Indo-Aryan languages, a branch of the wider Indo-European language family. It is derived through an Eastern Middle Indo-Aryan from Old Indo-Aryan, and ultimately from Proto-Indo-European. Grierson (1903) grouped the dialects of Chittagong under Southeastern Bengali, alongside the dialects of Noakhali and Akyab. Chatterji (1926) places Chittagonian in the eastern Vangiya group of Magadhi Prakrit and notes that all Bengali dialects were independent of each other and did not emanate from the literary Bengali called "sadhu bhasha". Among the different dialect groups of these eastern dialects, Chittagonian has phonetic and morphological properties that are not present in standard Bengali and other western dialects of Bengali.

== Phonology ==
Shah Mohammad Tayeb share his travel story in America, in Chittagonian.

=== Consonants ===
		Labial	Dental/ Alveolar	Retroflex	Palatal	Velar
Stop	voiceless	p	t̪	ʈ		k
Stop	voiced	b	d̪	ɖ		ɡ
Fricative	voiceless	f~ɸ	s		ʃ	x
Fricative	voiced		z			ɣ
Nasal		m	n			ŋ
Trill/Tap			ɾ~r			
Approximant	lateral		l			
Approximant	central	(w)			j	

- Approximants [w j] are only heard as allophones of vowels /i u/.
- /ʃ/ can have an allophone of [ç].
- /f/ can have a bilabial allophone of [ɸ] .

=== Vowels ===
	Front	Central	Back
High	i		u
High-mid	e		o
Low-mid	(ɛ)		ɔ
Low	æ	a	

- Nasalization occurs for seven vowels /ĩ ẽ æ̃ ã ɔ̃ õ ũ/.
- [ɛ] is heard as an allophone of /æ/.

== Writing system ==
The Bengali script (Bangla Lipi) and Latin script are used to write this language.

Gboard for Android has added a Chittagongian Keyboard.

== Sample text ==
The following text is Article 1 of the Universal Declaration of Human Rights, written in Chittagonian:

=== Bengali Script ===
বিয়াক মানুশ ইজ্‌জত এদ‌্দে অ়কর ই়শাবে আজাদ আর উ়য়াইন্‌না অ়ইয়েরে ফ়য়দা অ়য়। ই়তারাত্‌তু আহল এদ্‌দে বিবেক আছে ; এতল্‌লায় এজ্‌জন আরেজ্‌জনর উ়য়ারে ভাইয়ুর নান বেভার গরন দরহার।

=== Romanisation ===
Biyak manuś ijjôt edde ókôr íśabe ajad ar úyainnaa óiyere fôyda óy. Ítarattu ahôl edde bibek ase; etôllay ejjôn arejjônôr úyare bhaiyur nan bebhar gôrôn dôrhar.

=== English ===
All human beings are born free and equal in dignity and rights. They are endowed with reason and conscience and should act towards one another in a spirit of brotherhood.

== See also ==
- Chittagong
- Chittagong Division
- Chittagong Hill Tracts

== Bibliography ==
- Chatterji, Suniti Kumar (1926). The Origin and Development of the Bengali Language. Calcutta University Press.
- Grierson, G A, ed. (1903). Linguistic Survey of India: Indo-Aryan Family Eastern Group. Vol. V. Archived from the original on 27 June 2020.
