= Bible translations into Bengali =

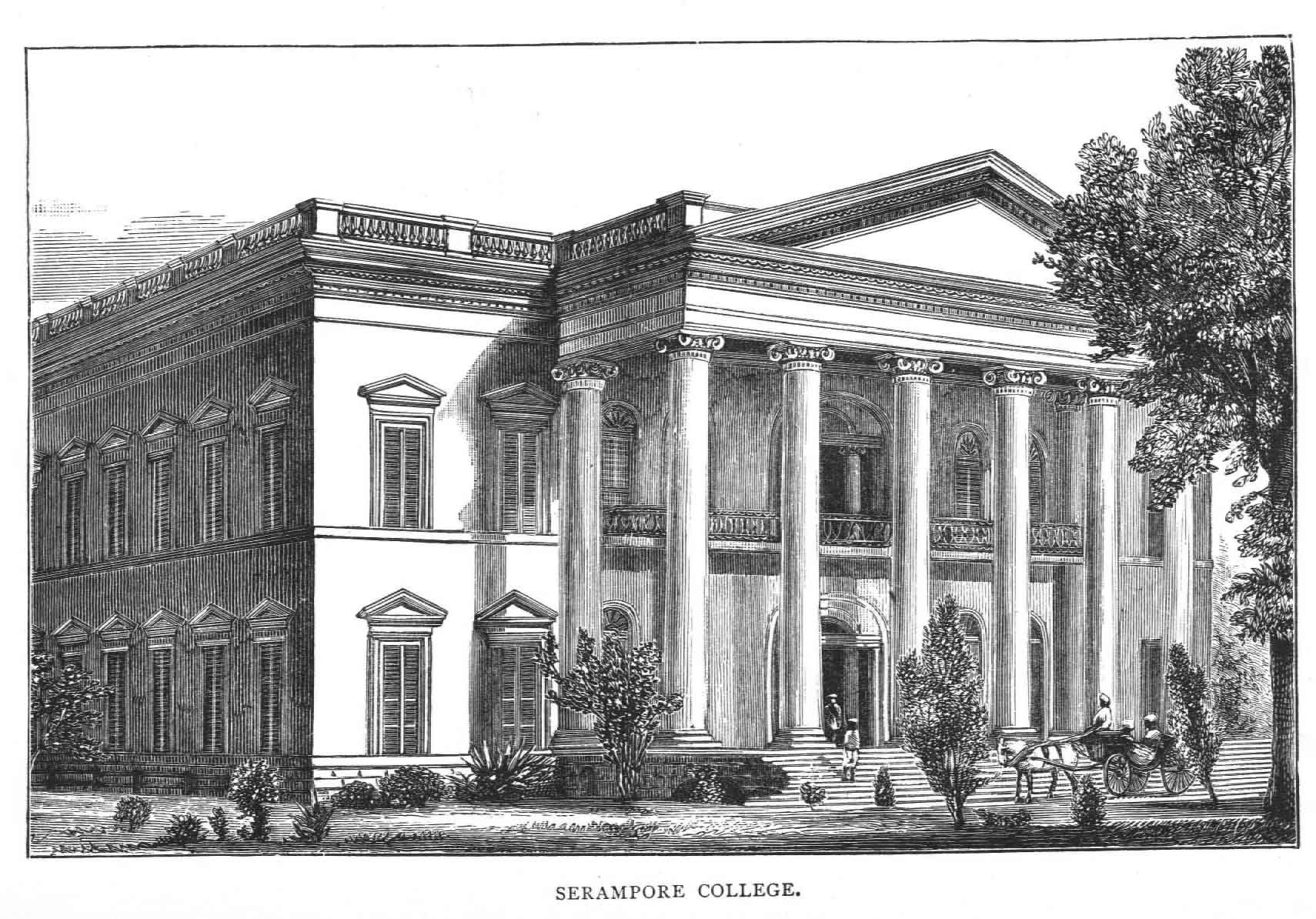
Serampore Missionary Press

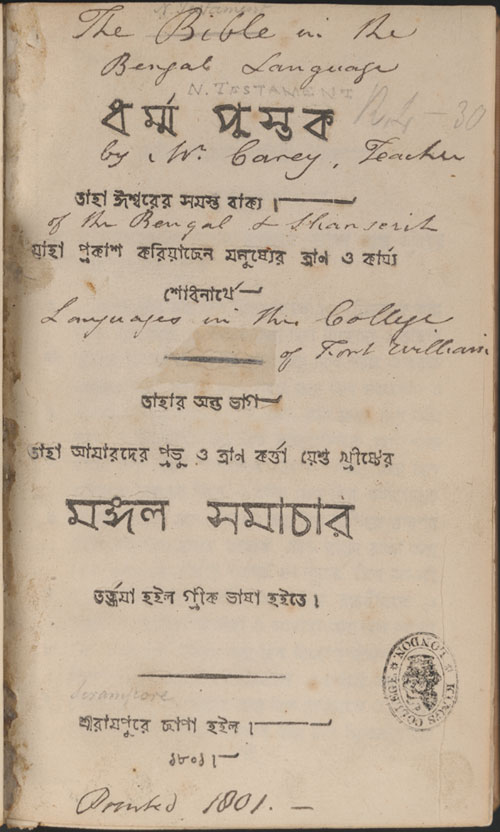
First Bengali New Testament

Nathaniel B. Halhead of the East India Company published a Bengali grammar for British officials in 1776 to aid interaction with the local Bengali population. William Carey of Serampore translated the Bible into the Bengali language and published it in 1793 and 1801. The high language Bengali translation in use in Bangladesh is derived from Carey's version, while "common language" versions are newer translations. Fr. Christian Mignon, a Belgian Jesuit, finished a revised version of the Bible in Bengali, named Mangalbarta, which has copious footnotes. Missionaries have also translated the Bible into "Musalmani Bangla", as well as the Chittagonian and Sylheti dialects.

== Christian Bengali ==
William Carey's translation of the Bible into Bengali was peculiar to mainstream Bengali. It came to be known as "Christian Bengali" and intelligibility of this new dialect was somewhat restricted to educated Bengali Christians. The Bengali converts to Christianity during the British rule were mainly Upper Caste Hindus and this translation of the Bible to "Christian Bengali" was prohibited to be revised in fear of Sanskritisation and subsequent Hinduisation of the converts. The dialect has become the language of Christian worship and Bengali Christian literature, but restricted to this small community; and therefore not allowing non-Christian Bengalis to understand. It is said to have been influenced by the works of the earlier Portuguese missionaries in Bengal who also established a Christianised Bengali dialect which lasted for roughly 150 years, before the establishment of Fort William College and rise of Anglo-Christian Bengali. The Portuguese settlers also inspired the use of a Portuguese dialect, known as Bengali Portuguese creole, which is no longer extant.

== Versions ==
- Pobitro Baibel The Bible in Bengali (Holy Bible) (SBCL) : Copyright Bible Society of Bangladesh 2001 Formerly called Re-edit Cary Version. Text version Audio of New Testament (Select Bengali, then Re-edit Bangla Version) Mobile Apps
- Kitabul Mukkadas (MCBI) : Copyright Bible Society of Bangladesh 1980 Audio (Select Bengali, then Mussalmani Version) Android
- Easy to Read Version (ERV) : Copyright WBTC India 2006 Audio (Select Bengali, then Easy-to-Read Version) Mobile Apps
- Common Language translation of the Bengali Bible : Copyright The Bible Society of India 1999
- Jubilee Bible : Copyright Catholic Bishops' Conference of Bangladesh, 2000
- The Holy Bible in Bengali : containing the Old and New Testaments, Calcutta, published by the British and Foreign Bible Society (Calcutta Auxiliary) in 1909: in public domain
