= Musasa language =

Indo-Aryan language of Nepal

Musasa
- Native to: Nepal
- Native speakers: 50,000 (2003)
- Language family: Indo-European: Indo-Iranian; Indo-Aryan; Eastern; Bihari; Tharu; Musasa

Language codes
- ISO 639-3: smm
- Glottolog: musa1263

Musasa an Indo-Aryan language of Nepal. It belongs to the Bihari group and is spoken in the Janakpur, Kosi and Sagarmatha zones. It is predominantly spoken by members of the Musahar caste.
