= Shobhana Chelliah =

American linguist

- Born: India
- Known for: Documentation of the Meitei, Manipuri, and Lamkang languages

Academic background
- Education: University of Texas (PhD); University of Delhi (AM); St. Stephen's College (AB)
- Doctoral advisor: Anthony C. Woodbury

Academic work
- Discipline: Linguistics
- Sub-discipline: Tibeto-Burman linguistics, Language documentation, Morphosyntax, Corpus linguistics
- Institutions: Indiana University, Bloomington; University of North Texas

Shobhana Chelliah is an Indian-American linguist who specializes in Sino-Tibetan languages. As of 2023, she is a professor of linguistics at Indiana University, Bloomington. Her research focuses on the documentation of the Tibeto-Burman languages of Northeast India.

== Career ==
Chelliah received her PhD in 1992 from the University of Texas, Austin, with a dissertation entitled, A study of Manipuri grammar. She joined the faculty of the University of North Texas (UNT) in 1996, where she held the positions of Distinguished Professor of Linguistics and Associate Dean of Research and Advancement at the College of Information until 2022. In 2020, she received the UNT Distinguished Research Professor Award.

Her publications include A Grammar of Meithei (Mouton 1997) and The Handbook of Descriptive Linguistic Fieldwork (Springer 2011) as well as articles on Tibeto-Burman differential case marking and language contact, many of which she has co-authored with her students.

She has partnered with individuals and academic institutions in India to create a state-of-the-art archive for the long term preservation and access of language documentation materials. This archive, the Computational Resource for South Asian Languages, is housed at the University of North Texas Digital Library. The project was partially funded by a 2022 Fulbright-Nehru Fellowship.

Her research has been supported by a number of NSF grants. She is working with Political Scientists James Meernik and Kimi King to create interdisciplinary frameworks to understand threats to language vitality. With health information expert Sara Champlain and phonologist Kelly Berkson, she is working to bring culturally-sensitive COVID information to underserved populations in the United States. With computational linguist, Alexis Palmer, she is working on discovering differential marking patterns through cross language comparison.

Chelliah was a Program Director for the US National Science Foundation’s Documenting Endangered Languages Program from 2012-2015.

== Selected publications ==
=== Tibeto-Burman ===
- Chelliah, Shobhana L. (1997). A grammar of Meithei. Berlin: Mouton de Gruyter.
- Chelliah, Shobhana L. (2004). "Polysemy through metonymy: The case of Meithei pi 'grandmother'". Studies in Language. 28 (2): 363–386.
- Singh, Harimohon Thounaojam & Shobhana Chelliah. (2007). The Lamkang Language: Grammatical Sketch, Texts and Lexicon. Published as a special issue of the Linguistics of the Tibeto-Burman Area. 30.1: 1-213.
- Chelliah, Shobhana L. & David Peterson, Tyler Utt, Evaline Blair, and Sumshot Khular. (2019). Lamkang Verb Conjugation. Himalayan Linguistics, Vol. 18(1) 8-25. Special Edition on Agreement in Kuki Chin, Linda Konnerth and Scott DeLancey, editors.
- Chelliah, Shobhana L. & Tyler P. Utt. (2017). The Syntax and Semantics of Spatial Reference in Lamkang Verb. Himalayan Linguistics, Vol. 16(1), 28-40. Special Issue on the Grammatical Encoding of Space, Carol Genetti and Kristine Hildebrandt, editors.
- Mary, Burke & Shobhana Chelliah and Melissa Robinson. (2019). Excrescent vowels in Lamkang prefix sequences. 6(2), 185–213.

=== Fieldwork and archiving ===
- Chelliah, Shobhana L. & Willem de Reuse. (2010). Handbook of Descriptive Linguistic Fieldwork. Springer Science & Business Media. pp. 176–177.
- Chelliah, Shobhana L. (2018). Reflections on language documentation in India. In Bradley McDonnell, Andrea L. Berez-Kroeker, and Gary Holton. (Eds.) Reflections on Language Documentation 20 Years after Himmelmann 1998. Language Documentation & Conservation Special Publication no. 15., 248-255. Honolulu: University of Hawai‘i Press.
- Chelliah, Shobhana L. (2018). The Impact of Language Documentation and Revitalization. In Dan McIntyre and Hazel Price (eds.), Applying Linguistics: Language and the Impact Agenda, 137-149. University of Huddersfield, United Kingdom: Routledge.
- Chelliah, Shobhana L. (2018). The design and implementation of documentation projects for spoken languages. In Kenneth Regh and Lyle Campbell (eds.), Oxford University handbook on endangered languages, 147-167. Oxford: Oxford University Press.
- Chelliah, Shobhana L. (2016). Responsive Methodology: Perspectives on data gathering and language documentation in India. Journal of South Asian Languages and Linguistics. Volume 3.2:176-196.
- Burke, Mary & Shobhana Chelliah and Mark Phillips (2019, May). Preparing Linguists’ Field Recordings and Datasets for Ingest into a Digital Library System: Lessons from creating the Lamkang language resource at the UNT Digital Library. Paper presented at the Texas Conference of Digital Libraries, University of Texas at Austin.
- Chelliah, Shobhana L. (2021). Why Language Documentation Matters. Dordrecht: Springer.

=== Case marking and differential marking ===
- Barðdal, Jóhanna & Shobhana Chelliah. (2009). The Role of Semantic, Pragmatic, and Discourse Factors in the Development of Case. Amsterdam: John Benjamins.
- Chelliah, Shobhana L. (2017). Ergativity in Tibeto-Burman. In Jessica Coon, Diane Massam, and Lisa Travis (eds.), Ergativity. The Oxford handbook of ergativity, 924-947. Oxford University Press.
- Chelliah, Shobhana l. & Gwen Hyslop. Special Issues on Optional Case Marking in Tibeto-Burman. Special Edition of Linguistics of the Tibeto-Burman Area. 34.2 (October 2011) and 35.1 (April 2012) La Trobe University, Melbourne Australia.
