= Eastern Bengali dialects =

Group of dialects of Bengali

Eastern Bengali
- Eastern Bengali; Vaṅga Bengali; Baṅgālī Bengali
- বঙ্গ বাংলা বঙ্গালী বাংলা
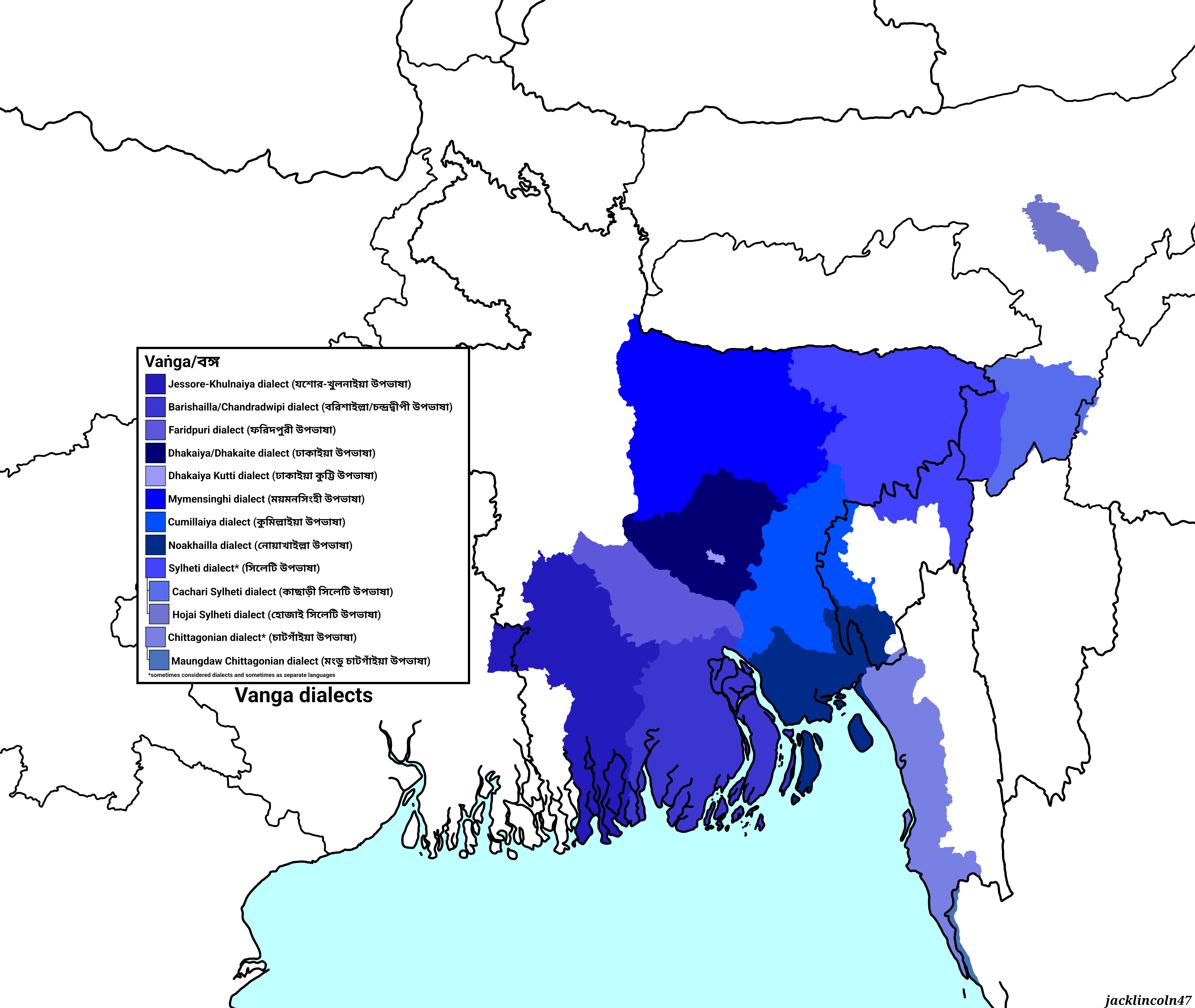
- Native to: Bangladesh; India; Myanmar
- Region: Bangladesh: Barisal Division, Chittagong Division, Dhaka Division, Mymensingh Division, Khulna Division (excluding Kushtia, Chuadanga, Meherpur, Satkhira, and adjacent areas) and Sylhet Division India: Tripura, Barak Valley, Hojai District, Jiribam District, Bangaon Subdivision of North 24 Parganas District and Andaman and Nicobar Islands Myanmar: Parts of Maungdaw District
- Language family: Indo-European: Indo-Iranian; Indo-Aryan; Eastern Zone; Bengali–Assamese; Bengali; Eastern Bengali
- Early forms: Gaudi Prakrit: Old Bengali; Middle Bengali
- Writing system: Bengali alphabet; Latin-Roman (Banglish); Sylhet Nagari (historical); Perso-Arabic (historical)

Language codes
- ISO 639-3: –
- Glottolog: vang1242 Vanga

Eastern Bengali, Baṅgālī Bengali (Bengali: বঙ্গালী বাংলা, romanized: Bôṅgāli Bāṅlā, pronounced [bɔŋgɑli bɑŋlɑ]) or Vaṅga Bengali (Bengali: বঙ্গ বাংলা, romanized: Bôṅgô Bāṅlā, pronounced [bɔŋgɔ bɑŋlɑ]), is a set of vernacular dialects of Bengali, spoken in most of Bangladesh, parts of Tripura and West Bengal, Barak Valley in Assam, Andaman and Nicobar Islands and surrounding areas.

== Names ==
It is also known as Baṅgālī (Bengali: বঙ্গালী, romanized: bôṅgāli), Pūrvavaṅgīẏa (Bengali: পূর্ববঙ্গীয়, romanized: pūrbôbôṅgiẏô), Prācya (Bengali: প্রাচ্য, romanized: prācyô), Vaṅga (Bengali: বঙ্গ, romanized: bôṅgô), or Vaṅgīẏa (Bengali: বঙ্গীয়, romanized: bôṅgiẏô). Chatterji often cited a more generalised variant of Eastern Bengali which he dubbed as, Typical East Bengali, for the sake of broader comparison with other varieties of Bengali. Eastern Bengali is colloquially referred to by the exonym Bāṅgāl Bhāshā (Bengali: বাঙাল ভাষা) in West Bengal due to its association with Bangals.

It may also be referred to by names such as Khaisi-Gesi Bangla (Bengali: খাইছি-গেছি বাংলা, romanized: khaisi-gesi baṅla, lit. 'I've eaten-I've gone Bengali'), emphasising the contrast between Eastern Bengali varieties and the standard language in terms of morphology (see below) by use of present perfect forms, with Typical East খাইছি (khaisi) and গেছি (gesi) corresponding to Standard Bengali খেয়েছি (kheẏechi) and গিয়েছি ~ গেছি (giẏechi ~ gechi).

== Geographical distribution ==
Suniti Kumar Chatterji, describing the cluster as "Vaṅga Dialects", further divided it into two groups of two: "Western and Southwestern Vaṅga" and "Eastern and Southeastern Vaṅga". Eastern Vaṅga is spoken across the modern Bangladeshi division of Sylhet and the Greater Comilla region of Chittagong along with the Barak Valley Division of Assam and the state of Tripura in India. Southeastern Vaṅga is spoken in the remaining area of the Chittagong division, corresponding to the former colonial territories of Noakhali District and Chittagong District, and historically extended further into Sittwe. Western Vaṅga is spoken across the Bangladeshi divisions of Mymensingh, Dhaka, and Barisal. Southwestern Vaṅga is spoken across the Khulna Division, where Eastern Bengali transitions into Central Standard Bengali.

A map of Bengal (and some districts of Assam and Jharkhand) which shows the dialects of the Bengali Language according to Suniti Kumar Chatterji. Western Rāḍha Southwestern Rāḍha Eastern Rāḍha Varendra Kāmarūpa Eastern and Southeastern Vaṅga Western and Southwestern Vaṅga

Dr. Muhammad Shahidullah divided all Bengali dialects into two groups: Prācya (Bengali: প্রাচ্য, romanized: prācyô, lit. 'eastern') and Pāścātya (Bengali: পাশ্চাত্য, romanized: pāścātyô, lit. 'western'). Within his Prācya grouping, he created the divisions of "Southeastern" and "Extreme Eastern", which approximately correspond to Chatterji's "Western and Southwestern Vaṅga" and "Eastern and Southeastern Vaṅga", respectively. The Southeastern group is spoken across the modern Bangladeshi divisions of Mymensingh, Dhaka, Barisal, and Khulna, as well as the Greater Noakhali region of the Chittagong division and eastern parts of the 24 Parganas district in West Bengal. The Extreme Eastern group is spoken across the Bangladeshi divisions Sylhet and Chittagong, including Greater Comilla and excluding Greater Noakhali, as well as the Barak Valley division of Assam.

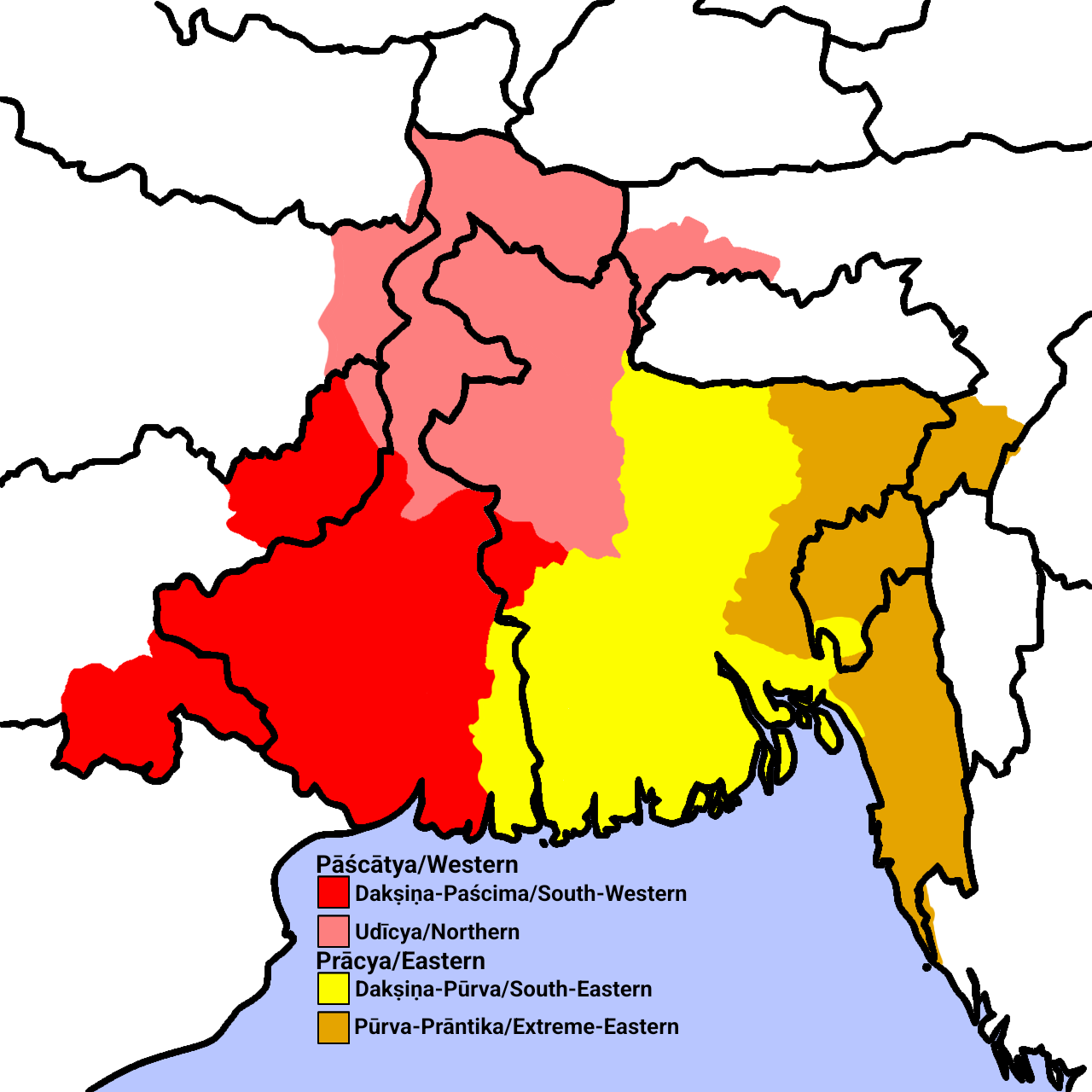
Bengali dialects according to Shahidullah

Gopal Haldar, in his study of Eastern Bengali, divided all East Bengali dialects into four groups. Group I or "Central East Bengali" spans the modern Bangladeshi divisions of Mymensingh, Dhaka, Faridpur, and Barisal, as well as the district of Chandpur in Chittagong Division. The de facto Standard East Bengali spoken around the Bikrampur region is a member of this group, comparable to Chatterji's "Typical East Bengali". Group II or "Central North East Bengali" is spoken in eastern areas of the Mymensingh and Dhaka divisions, the western half of the Sylhet Division, as well as the Brahmanbaria District of the Chittagong Division. Group III or "North East Bengali" is spoken in the eastern half of the Sylhet Division as well as the bordering Barak Valley division of Assam, India. Group IV or "South East Bengali" is spoken in the Chittagong Division, notably excluding the Greater Comilla region. The Comilla District and Tripura state of India, the Bengalis in the latter chiefly being migrants from the former, sit at the confluence of all the major groupings and thus the speech of this region shares features with all the major groups classified by Haldar. Transitionary East Bengali is spoken in the Khulna division as well as Western Greater Faridpur i.e. Rajbari District, which shares features with both Standard Bengali and Eastern Bengali dialects.

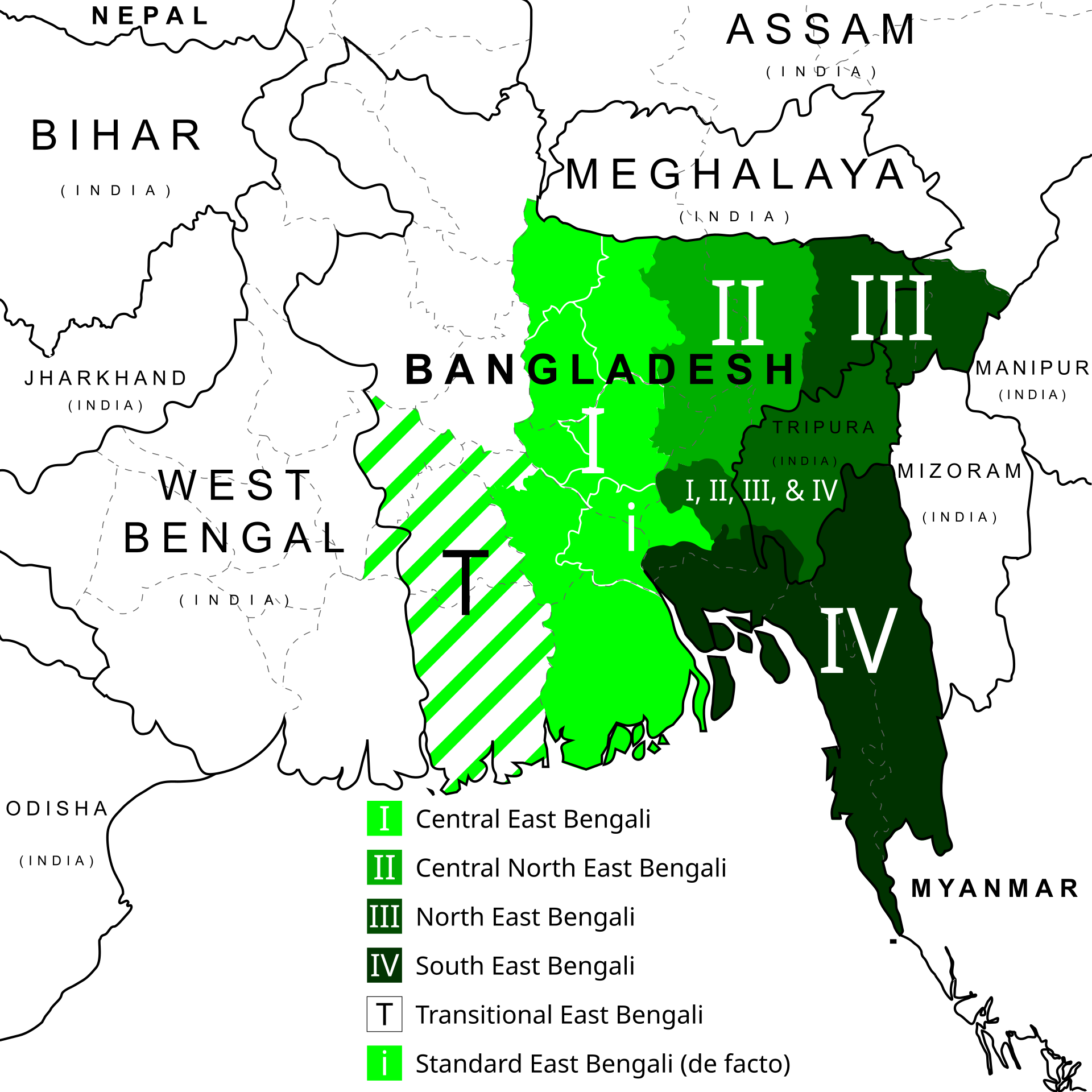
A map showing the dialects of Eastern Bengali according to Gopal Haldar.

== Phonology ==
Eastern Bengali is characterised by a considerably smaller phoneme inventory when compared with Standard Bengali.

=== Epenthesis ===
Modern eastern Bengali notably preserves the Middle Bengali tendency of a form of "epenthesis" (Bengali: অপিনিহিতি, romanized: ôpinihiti), which is more accurately described as the retrograde metathesis of high-vowel glides (i.e. /i̯/ and /u̯/) across a non-initial consonant boundary. Thus, the equivalent of Standard Literary Bengali করিয়া (ISO-15919: kariẏā) 'having done' in Typical East Bengali is [kɔ̝i̯ɾa̟], having gone through the medial phase of *[kɔi̯ɾi̯ä], from original [kɔɾi̯ɑ]; by comparison, the Standard Colloquial Bengali equivalent is [kore], as the standard language has undergone the additional phonological processes of syncope and umlaut, unlike most Eastern Bengali dialects.

Similar occurrences of metathesis occur in the case of consonant conjuncts containing ‍্য jôphôla, due to the fact that it had, in earlier Bengali, also represented the addition of the semivowel [i̯] at the end of a conjunct containing it in addition to its current standard usage of simply geminating the previous consonant in the conjunct. সত্য (ISO-15919: satya, 'truth'), for example, pronounced [ʃɔt̪ːi̯ɔ] in Middle Bengali, is pronounced [ʃɔ̝i̯t̪ːo] in Eastern Bengali and [ʃot̪ːo] in Standard Bengali.

Metathesis also occurs in the case of consonant conjuncts which were once pronounced with [i̯] as a component even if they do not contain ‍্য jôphôla itself, such as ক্ষ (ISO-15919: kṣa), whose value in earlier Bengali was [kːʰi̯]. Hence রাক্ষস (ISO-15919: rākṣasa, 'rakshasa'), with the Middle Bengali pronunciation of [rɑkːʰi̯ɔʃ], is pronounced [räi̯kʰːɔ́ʃ] or [räi̯kːɔ́ʃ] in Eastern Bengali and [räkːʰoʃ] in Standard Bengali. Such is also the case for the conjunct জ্ঞ (ISO-15919: jña), which had the value of [gːĩ̯] in earlier Bengali. Hence, আজ্ঞা (ISO-15919: ājñā, 'order'), with the Middle Bengali pronunciation of [ɑgːĩ̯ɑ], has the Typical East Bengali pronunciation of [äi̯gːa̟] and the Standard Bengali [ägːä̃].

There is also a tendency to hypercorrect, leading to the diphthongisation of other vowels with [i̯] (true epenthesis) if they precede any geminated consonant, even when there is no etymological basis to do so. For example, ব্রাহ্ম (ISO-15919: brāhma, 'Brahmo') has the Standard Bengali pronunciation of [bɾämɦo], or, more commonly, [bɾämːo], but may be pronounced [bɾäi̯mːɔ̝] in Eastern Bengali as if it were spelt ব্রাম্য (ISO-15919: brāmya).

=== Vowels ===
	Front	Central	Back
Close	i		u
Close-mid	(e)		(o)
Open-mid	ɛ		ɔ
Open		ä	

- The vowels /e/ and /o/ in the standard language are shifted to /ɛ/ and /u/, respectively. For example, দেশ (ISO-15919: dēśa, 'country') and দোষ (ISO-15919: dōṣa, 'blame') are respectively pronounced [d̪eʃ] and [d̪oʃ] in Standard Bengali but [d̪ɛʃ] and [d̪uʃ] in typical East Bengali. /e/ and /o/ may be considered marginal phonemes, due to lack of mergers in rare instances (including all glide forms), such as in কেন (ISO-15919: kēn, 'buy') and ধো (ISO-15919: dhō, 'wash').
- /ɛ/ and /ɔ/ have raised allophones, [ɛ̝] and [ɔ̝], that occur when followed by a close vowel such as /i/ or /u/. This raising also occurs in open syllables.
- /ɑ/ is centralized, generally pronounced [ä]. A major exception to this is when the previous vowel is /i/, especially in cases of metathesis, where a fronted allophone [a̟] is used instead.
- Although western dialects of Bengali feature distinct nasalised forms of each of its vowels, nasalisation is absent in most dialects of Eastern Bengali with the notable exception of Southeastern Vaṅga. This lack of nasalisation also characterises the Standard Bengali of Bangladesh.

=== Consonants ===
			Labial	Dental	Alveolar	Palato-alveolar	Retroflex	Velar	Glottal
Nasal			m		n			ŋ	
Plosive	voiceless	unaspirated	p	t̪	t			k	
Plosive	voiceless	aspirated		(t̪ʰ)	(tʰ)			(kʰ)	
Plosive	voiced		b	d̪	d			ɡ	
Affricate	voiceless				(t͡s)				
Affricate	voiced								
Fricative	voiceless		ɸ		s	ʃ		x	h
Fricative	voiced				z				
Approximant					l				
Rhotic					ɾ				

- Phonemic voiceless aspirated stops—/kʰ/, /tʰ/, and /t̪ʰ/—have been attributed to some Vaṅga dialects, only contrasting with their unaspirated counterparts in initial position. However, their phonemic status is based on analogy with West Central and North Central Bengali. Učida (1970) provides the alternative interpretation that these aspirates are allophones—[kʰ], [tʰ], and [t̪ʰ]—of corresponding voiceless unaspirated stops—/k/, /t/, and /t̪/—which occur when followed by a suprasegmental change in pitch, i.e. raised tone. Rarely, some dialects invariably aspirate initial /t̪/ to [t̪ʰ].
- Like Standard Bengali, Eastern Bengali lacks true retroflexes. However it further fronts the apical postalveolar stops of the standard language to apico-alveolar.
- Voiceless stops—/k/, /t/, /p/ and their aspirated equivalents—undergo lenition variably.
  - The voiceless labial and velar stops undergo lenition into spirants, such that [p] becomes [ɸ] and [k] and [kʰ] become [x] or (only intervocalically) [h]. Western forms (e.g. Khulna, Jashore) spirantize intervocal /k/ and /kʰ/ only, intermediate forms (e.g. Mymensingh, Faridpur, Barishal, Cumilla) further spirantize all /p/, and far-eastern forms (e.g. Sylhet, Noakhali) spirantize all /p/, /k/ and /kʰ/; however, the Dhaka dialect can retain all /p/, /k/ and /kʰ/. Hence পাকা (ISO-15919: pākā, 'ripe'), pronounced [päkä] in Standard Bengali, may variably be pronounced [pähä], [ɸähä], or [ɸäxä] in Eastern Bengali dialects. Like Standard Bengali, /pʰ/ is generally spirantized in all positions, with variable retention in initial position in western forms. Sometimes, an intervocal /h/ can also undergo deletion. For example, বিকাল (ISO-15919: bikāla, 'afternoon'), pronounced [bikäl] in Standard Bengali, may be pronounced [bi̯a̟l] in Eastern Bengali. However, spirantization never occurs when the stops are geminated, hence চক্কর (ISO-15919: cakkara, 'circle') is pronounced [t͡sɔkːɔɾ] or [sɔkːɔɾ].
  - When followed by a rounded vowel, [ɸ] and [h] are interchangeable in some varieties of Eastern Bengali. For example, কাঁকই (ISO-15919: kām̐kaï, 'comb') [kähɔ̝i̯] may often be pronounced [käɸɔ̝i̯] and ফকীর (ISO-15919: phakīra, 'beggar') [ɸɔ̝hiɾ] may often be pronounced [hɔ̝hiɾ]. This merger is expanded upon in the Noakhali dialect, where all word-initial [ɸ] (and, by extension, [p]) are pronounced [h], e.g. পাগল (ISO-15919: pāgala) 'madman' [pägɔl] → [ɸägɔl] → [hägɔl], and by some speakers of the Mymensingh and Cumilla dialects, who pronounce all [ɸ] as [h], e.g. ঢুপি (ISO-15919: ḍhupi) [d̠ʱupi] → [dúɸi] → [dúhi] 'dove'.
  - Intervocalic /t/ and /tʰ/ tend to lenite to a voiced allophone [d] in many Eastern Bengali dialects. For example, মাটি (ISO-15919: māṭi, 'soil') is pronounced [mät̠i] in Standard Bengali, but [mädi] in many Eastern Bengali varieties. However, this never occur in geminates, so টাট্টি (ISO-15919: ṭāṭṭi, 'latrine') remains mostly similar across Bengali, being [t̠ät̠ːi] in Standard Bengali and [tätːi] in Eastern Bengali.
- The voiced retroflex flap found in Standard Bengali is almost always merged with /ɾ/ in Eastern Bengali, though it may occur in a minute number of speakers. This merger of /ɽ/ and /ɾ/ also characterises the Standard Bengali of Bangladesh.
- Similar to North Central Bengali dialects, Eastern Bengali dialects tend to spirantise the Standard Bengali palato-alveolar affricates /t͡ʃ/, /t͡ʃʰ/, and both /d͡ʒ/ and /d͡ʒʱ/, into [t͡s], [s], and [z], respectively. For example, চোর (ISO-15919: cōra, 'thief'), ছয় (ISO-15919: chaẏa, 'six'), and জাড় (ISO-15919: jāṛa, 'cold') are respectively pronounced [t͡ʃoɾ], [t͡ʃʰɔe̯], and [d͡ʒäɽ] in Standard Bengali but [t͡suɾ], [sɔ́e̯], and [zäɾ] in Typical East Bengali. /t͡s/ tends to merge with /s/ in further eastern varieties. [d͡z] is an allophone of /z/ that more frequently occurs in western varieties of Vaṅga. [t͡ʃ] occurs as an allophone of /t͡s/ and /s/ while [d͡ʒ] occurs as an allophone of /z/ in geminates, nasal-affricate, sibilant-affricate and dissimilar affricate consonant clusters, e.g. আচ্ছা (ISO-15919: ācchā, 'okay') /äsːä/ [ä(i̯)t͡ʃː(ʰ)a̟], ইঞ্চি (ISO-15919: iñci, 'inch') /int͡si ~ insi/ [int͡ʃi], ইজ্জৎ (ISO-15919: ijjat, 'honour') /izːɔt̪/ [id͡ʒːɔt̪], আশ্চর্য (ISO-15919: āścarya, 'surprising') /äʃt͡sɔ̝i̯ɾzɔ̝/ [äʃt͡ʃɔ̝i̯ɾzɔ̝], বুঝছি (ISO-15919: bujhchi, 'I understood') /busːi/ [but͡ʃː(ʰ)i ~ buzt͡ʃː(ʰ)i ~ bud͡ʒsi].
- In older vocabulary (tadbhava, tatsama, and deśi words), /ʃ/ has a tendency to debuccalise to [h] in word-initial position, e.g. শালা (ISO-15919: śālā, 'brother-in-law') /ʃälä/ → [hälä]. Rarely, it can debuccalize and variably be deleted in intervocalic position (when not geminated), e.g. বসা (ISO-15919: basā, 'to sit') /bɔʃä/ → [bɔhä] ~ [bɔo̯ä], and word-final position, e.g. মানুষ (ISO-15919: mānuṣa, 'people') /mänuʃ/ → [mänuh] ~ [mänu].

=== Tone ===
The aspiration and breathy voice present in Standard Bengali is notably mostly in Eastern Bengali. The West Bengali linguists Chatterji and Sen described the deaspirated voiced consonants present in Eastern Bengali as being implosive consonants, such that the Standard Bengali phonemes /bʱ/, /d̪ʱ/, /ɖʱ/, /dʒʱ/, and /ɡʱ/ would respectively correspond to /ɓ/, /ɗ̪/, /ᶑ/, /ɗʒ/, and /ɠ/ in Eastern Bengali. However, Animesh K. Pal, a native speaker of Eastern Bengali from Narayanganj, disputed this claim, instead describing the deaspiration as leading to the development of tones.

Word	ISO 15919	Standard Bengali IPA	Eastern Bengali IPA	Tone	Meaning
গাঁও	gām̐ō	[gä̃o̯]	[gäo̯]	level	village
ঘাও	ghāō	[gʱäo̯]	[gä́o̯]	high	wound
গড়	gaṛa	[gɔɽ]	[gɔɾ]	level	ditch
ঘর	ghara	[gʱɔɾ]	[gɔ́ɾ]	high	room
গোড়া	gōṛā	[goɽä]	[guɾä]	level	ditch
ঘোড়া	ghōṛā	[gʱoɽä]	[gúɾä]	high	horse
জ্বর	jvara	[d͡ʒɔɾ]	[zɔɾ]	level	fever
ঝড়	jhaṛa	[d͡ʒʱɔɽ]	[zɔ́ɾ]	high	storm
জাল	jāla	[d͡ʒäl]	[zäl]	level	net
ঝাল	jhāla	[d͡ʒʱäl]	[zä́l]	high	hot
জামা	jāmā	[d͡ʒäma]	[zäma]	level	shirt
ঝামা	jhāmā	[d͡ʒʱäma]	[zä́ma]	high	vitrified brick
জীর	jīra	*[d͡ʒiɾ]	[ziɾ]	level	earthworm
ঝির	jhira	[d͡ʒʱiɾ]	[zíɾ]	high	of maidservant
ডাক	ḍāka	[d̠äk]	[däk]	level	do call
ঢাক	ḍhāka	[d̠ʱäk]	[dä́k]	high	dhak
ডাকা	ḍākā	[d̠äkä]	[däɦä]	level	to call
ঢাকা	ḍhākā	[d̠ʱäkä]	[dä́ɦä]	high	Dhaka
ডোল	ḍōla	[d̠ol]	[dul]	level	container of paddy
ঢোল	ḍhōla	[d̠ʱol]	[dúl]	high	dhol
ডিম, ডিমা	ḍima, ḍimā	[d̠im], *[d̠imä]	[dim], [dimä]	level	egg
ঢিমা	ḍhimā	[d̠ʱimä]	[dímä]	high	slow
ডোলা	ḍōlā	[d̠olä]	[dulä]	level	container of fish made from bamboo shavings
ঢোলা	ḍhōlā	[d̠ʱolä]	[dúlä]	high	bending from side to side
দর	dara	[d̪ɔɾ]	[d̪ɔɾ]	level	price
ধর	dhara	[d̪ʱɔɾ]	[d̪ɔ́ɾ]	high	do catch
দান	dāna	[d̪än]	[d̪än]	level	donation
ধান	dhāna	[d̪ʱän]	[d̪ä́n]	high	paddy
দোয়া	dōẏā	[d̪oä]	[d̪uä]	level	to milk
ধোয়া	dhōẏā	[d̪ʱoä]	[d̪úä]	high	to wash
দুল	dula	[d̪ul]	[d̪ul]	level	a kind of earring
ধুলা	dhula	[d̪ʱulä]	[d̪úlä]	high	dust
বাত	bāta	[bät̪]	[bät̪]	level	rheumatism
ভাত	bhāta	[bʱät̪]	[bä́t̪]	high	boiled rice
বালা	bālā	[bälä]	[bälä]	level	bangle
ভালা	bhālā	*[bʱälä]	[bä́lä]	high	good
বাপ	bāpa	[bäp]	[bäp ~ bäɸ]	level	father
ভাপ	bhāpa	[bʱäp]	[bä́p ~ bä́ɸ]	high	steam

These tones are not limited to voiced aspirates, but are also present as compensation for the aspiration of consonants that correspond to voiceless aspirates in Standard Bengali. Tone continues to exist in words even if they are not part of a near-identical pair that requires it for the sake of contrast.

Word	ISO 15919	Standard Bengali IPA	Eastern Bengali IPA	Tone	Meaning
বাচা মাছ	bācā mācha	[bät͡ʃä mät͡ʃ(ʰ)]	[bät͡sä mäs ~ bäsä mäs]	level	Eutropiichthys vacha
বাছা মাছ	bāchā mācha	[bät͡ʃʰä mät͡ʃ(ʰ)]	[bäsä́ mäs]	high	selected fish
চাও	cāō	[t͡ʃäo̯]	[t͡säo̯ ~ säo̯]	level	you want
ছাও	chāō	[t͡ʃʰäo̯]	[sä́o̯]	high	young ones of the animals
কাঁচের	kām̐cēra	[kä̃t͡ʃeɾ]	[kät͡sɛɾ ~ käsɛɾ]	level	of glass
কাছের	kāchēra	[kät͡ʃʰeɾ]	[käsɛ́ɾ]	high	of near
চিঁড়া	cim̐ṛā	[t͡ʃĩɽä]	[t͡siɾä ~ siɾä]	level	chira
ছিঁড়া	chim̐ṛā	[t͡ʃʰĩɽä]	[síɾä]	high	torn
কুটা	kuṭā	[kut̠ä]	[kudä]	level	to cut in pieces
কোঠা	kōṭhā	[kot̠ʰä]	[kudä́]	high	room
কাঁটা	kām̐ṭā	[kä̃t̠ä]	[kädä]	level	thorn
কাঠা	kāṭhā	[kät̠ʰä]	[kädä́]	high	katha
উটা	uṭā	*[ut̠ä]	[udä]	level	front step
উঠা	uṭhā	[ut̠ʰä]	[udä́]	high	do lift up

Furthermore, the [h] of Standard Bengali is often deleted in Eastern Bengali dialects. This h-dropping has also been said to result in tone.

Word	ISO 15919	Standard Bengali IPA	Eastern Bengali IPA	Tone	Meaning
আতা	ātā	[ät̪ä]	[ät̪ä]	level	sugar apple
হাতা	hātā	[hät̪ä]	[ä́t̪ä]	high	sleeve, ladle
আছে	āchē	[ät͡ʃʰe]	[äsɛ̝]	level	is
হাঁচে	hām̐cē	[hä̃t͡ʃe]	[ä́t͡sɛ̝ ~ ä́sɛ̝]	high	sneezes
আঠা	āṭhā	[ät̠ʰä]	[ädä́]	level	glue
হাঁটা	hām̐ṭā	[hä̃t̠ä]	[ä́dä]	high	to walk
আড়াই	āṛāi	[äɽäi̯]	[äɾäi̯]	level	two and a half
হারাই	hārāi	[häɾäi̯]	[ä́ɾäi̯]	high	I lose

== Morphology ==
A number of grammatical features distinguish Eastern Bengali from other dialect groups and the standard lect of Bengali, including the following:

- The objective marker is -রে (re), as opposed to -ক, -কে (k, ke) in non-eastern dialects and only -কে (ke) in the standard, but both ke and re are used in standard literary Bengali.
- One of the locative markers is -ত, -তে (t, te), which is shared with most non-eastern dialects but unlike the standard which uses the form -তে (te) only.
- The genitive marker for plural animate objects is -গর ~ -গো (gôr ~ go), which is derived from early Bengali -কর ~ -কঅ (kar ~ kaa), and is shared with eastern lects of the North Central and Southern Bengali groups, as opposed to the marker -দের (der) in other western lects and the standard, but the go or ger genetive plural suffix is also found in some western Bengali-speaking areas. Likewise, the objective marker is either -গরে (gôre) or the same as the genitive. Like the other dialect groups, oblique use of the nominative marker -(এ)রা ((e)rā) for animate pronouns is present but rare, though its frequency increases in the dialects of Mymensingh and Cumilla.
- The nominative case for animate (and active inanimate) nouns can sometimes be marked with -এ (e) for any verb type. In early Bengali, it used to be common and restricted for transitive verbs only, but now it is lost in the other groups.
- Like North Central Bengali, the 3rd and 2nd person honorific marker -এন (en) for the present indicative is also used for the present imperative, replacing -উন (un) which is used in other western groups and the standard. Additionally, -এন (en) can be replaced by -অইন ~ -উইন (ôin ~ uin) in the dialects of Mymensingh and Cumilla.
- The 2nd person informal marker for the present indicative is -অছ (ôch, IPA: /ɔs/) in most eastern dialects and -অস (ôś, IPA: /ɔʃ/) in the dialects of the western parts of Faridpur and Barishal, but the dialects of Khulna, Jashore and Rajbari use -ইস (iś, IPA: /iʃ/) like the other dialect groups and the standard. Dialects with -অছ (ôch) also tend to change the 2nd person informal marker for the unrelated but similar-looking future imperative from -ইস (iś) to -ইছ (ich, IPA: /is/).
- The 2nd person familiar marker for the three non-present tenses is -আ (ā), shared with the North Central and Southern Bengali groups, as opposed to the more western groups and the standard which mostly use -এ (e) instead, but both ā and e are used in standard literary Bengali.
- The 1st person marker for the simple past and past conditional/habitual tenses is uniformly -আম (ām) — hence respectively -(ই)লাম ((i)lām) and -(ই)তাম ((i)tām) — agreeing with the standard but unlike the non-eastern groups which additionally (or, sometimes, more preferably) use -উম ~ -ওঁ ~ -উ (um ~ õ ~ u).
- The future marker for 1st person is mostly -(ই)মু ((i)mu), derived from early Bengali -ইবোঁ ~ -ইবুঁ (ibõ ~ ibũ), where the nasalization of the vowel impacted the labial stop, as a result intervocalic b becomes m; there is also a metathesized form -উম (um) that can occur if the verb stem ends in a consonant. The marker is shared with some North Central Bengali varieties (which also use -(ই)মো ((i)mo) but not with other western groups and the standard which use the denasalized -(ই)বো ((i)bo) instead. Additionally, the dialects of Mymensingh and Cumilla can use the suffix -(ই)বাম ~ -(ই)আম ((i)bām ~ (i)ām) here, mirroring the two past tenses.
- The future marker for 3rd person ordinary is -(ই)ব ((i)bô) in most eastern dialects, but the dialects of Khulna, Jashore and western parts of Faridpur and Barishal use -(ই)বে ((i)be) like the other dialect groups and the standard.
- For the three non-present tenses, the -ই- (i) element in their respective bases are mostly retained in Eastern and North Central Bengali, mainly after vowel-ending verb stems, but lost in other western groups and the standard.
- The 3rd person ordinary nominative is mostly হে (he), debuccalized from earlier সে (śe), which can still occur in the dialects of Khulna, Jashore and Rajbari, with general plural and oblique singular base তা- (tā), like in western groups and the standard. In the remaining dialects, besides the -তা tā base, হে (he) can variably supplant other 3rd person cases: in Dhaka, Mymensingh, western parts of Faridpur and Barishal, it becomes the base for the plural ordinary, and elsewhere it becomes the base for the entire 3rd person ordinary. In parts of Dhaka, Mymensingh and Cumilla, the 3rd person ordinary can have gender distinction through the use of the feminine তাই (tāi), in which case হে (he) becomes masculine.
- The 3rd person honorific nominative is তিনি (tini) (with oblique তেনা- (tenā)), derived from earlier tāni, in the dialects of Khulna, Jashore, Faridpur and Barishal like in some western groups and the standard. In parts of Dhaka, Mymemsingh and Comilla, it is তাইন (tāin) (with oblique তা(ই)ন- (tā(i)n)) due to metathesis.
- The existential verb stem আছ- (āch, IPA: /äs/) mostly retains its initial vowel across both simple present and simple past tenses, unlike non-eastern dialects and the standard which drop it from the simple past; e.g. for 3rd person ordinary it is আছিল (āchilô, IPA: /äsilɔ̝/) in Eastern but ছিল (chilô) in others. Additionally, tone remains neutral after the affricate in this verb, despite its lost aspiration.
- The progressive aspect is formed through variously fused combinations of the imperfect participle -ইতে (ite) and the existential verb. For example, the present progressive 3rd person form for the verb করা (kôrā, 'to do', IPA: /kɔɾä/) is either করতেছে (IPA: [kɔ̝(i̯)ɾt̪ɛ̝sɛ̝]), করতাছে (IPA:[kɔɾt̪äsɛ̝]), or করতে আছে (IPA: [kɔ̝(i̯)ɾt̪ɛ̝ äsɛ̝]). This eastern feature was also adopted into standard literary Bengali. In contrast, the non-eastern dialects fuse the existential auxiliary directly with the main verb stem and (in case that the stem ends in a vowel) the affricate is doubled; e.g. for করা the form is করছে (kôrche, IPA: [ko(i̯)ɾt͡ʃ(ʰ)e] ~ [ko(i̯)ɾse]), while for খাওয়া (khāẇā, 'to eat', IPA: /kʰäo̯ä/) it is খাচ্ছে (khācche, IPA: [kʰät͡ʃː(ʰ)e] ~ [kʰät͡sː(ʰ)e]).
- The perfect aspect is formed by fusing the conjunctive/perfect participle -ই (i) with the existential verb, with the -ই subsequently being metathesized and mostly lost (unless the main verb stem ends in a vowel), resulting in a similar but unrelated appearance to non-eastern progressive forms. For example, the present perfect 3rd person forms for করা and খাওয়া are করছে (IPA:[kɔ̝(i̯)ɾsɛ̝] ~ [kɔɾsɛ̝]) and খাইছে (IPA: [kʰäi̯sɛ̝]), respectively. In contrast, non-eastern dialects use the other conjunctive/perfect participle -ইয়া (iẏā) here, now contracted to -এ (e), with variable trace of the metathesized high vowel; e.g. for করা it is করেছে (kôreche, IPA: [ko(i̯)ɾet͡ʃ(ʰ)e] ~ [ko(i̯)ɾese] ~ [ko(i̯)ɾɛse]).
- The causative conjunctive/perfect participle marker is -আইয়া (āiẏā), unlike the umlauted -ইয়ে (iẏe) of some non-eastern groups and the standard, though the partially umlauted -আয়ে (āẏe) can exist in the dialects of Khulna, Jashore and parts of Faridpur. -আইয়া (āiẏā) can sometimes be reduced to -আয় (āẏ), especially in the dialects of Dhaka, Mymensingh and Cumilla.
- The emphatic particle -নে (ne) is often used after future conjugated verbs, derived from the adverb of time অখনে (ôkhône, 'at that time', IPA: /ɔkʰɔne/ > /ɔhɔnɛ̝/ > /ɔnɛ̝/). The emphatic particle -খনে (khône) is also commonly found in the Western dialects such as "jābo khône" (will go later).

== Mymensinghi Bengali ==
Mymensinghi Bengali (Bengali: ময়মনসিংহী বাংলা) is an eastern dialect of the Bengali language, spoken primarily in the greater Mymensingh region of Bangladesh. Mymemsinghi Bengali closely resembles the dialect of greater Dhaka region. It is also highly mutually intelligible with other dialects of Bengali. It is commonly classified among the "Central East Bengali" varieties of Bengali language.

Mymensinghi Bengali
- Momensinga; Mominsinga
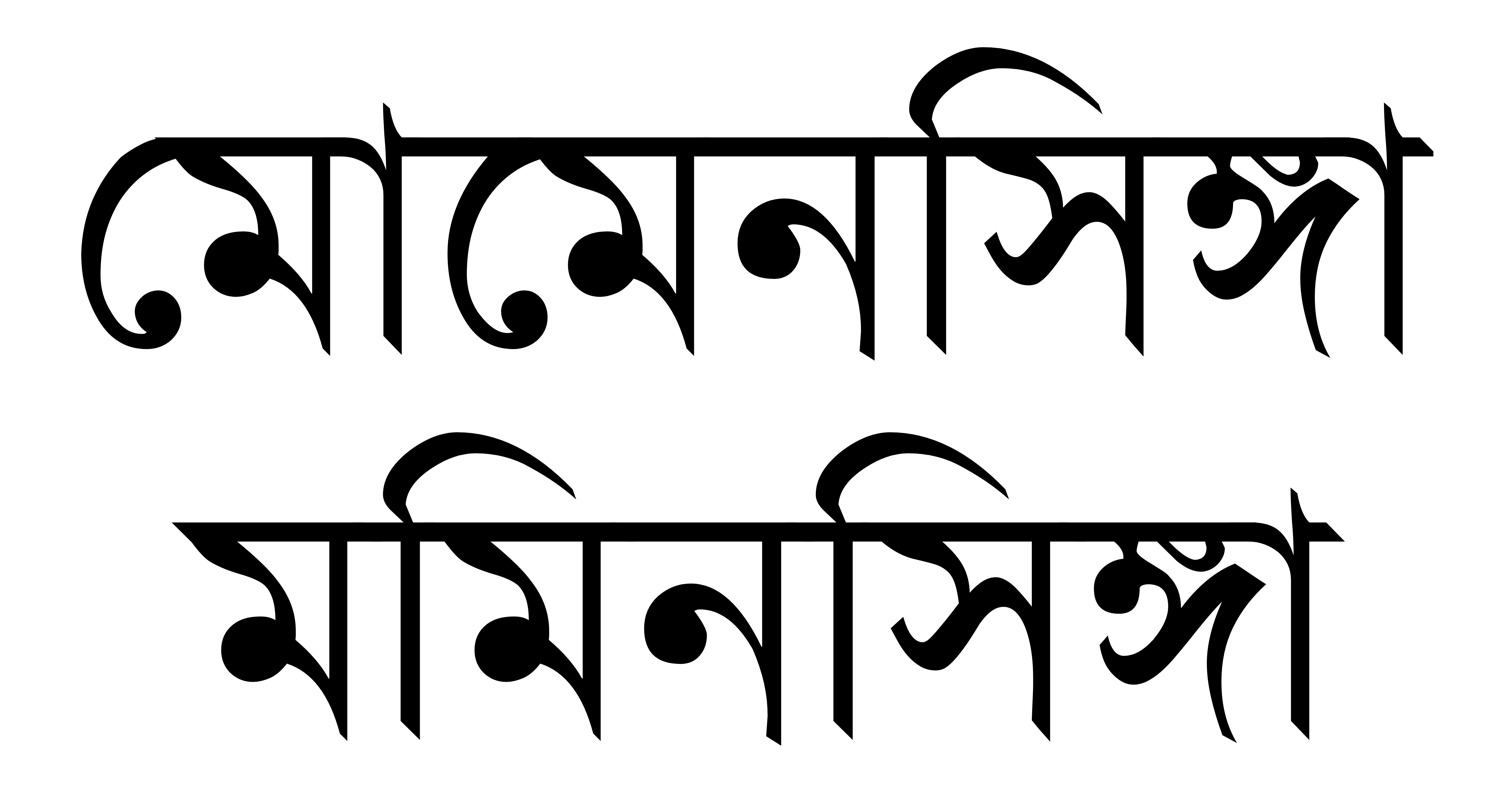
- Native to: Bangladesh & India
- Region: Mymensingh Division, Dhaka division, Sylhet Division, Rangpur Division
- Language family: Indo-European: Indo-Iranian; Indo-Aryan; Eastern; Bengali–Assamese; Bengali; Eastern Bengali; Mymensinghi Bengali
- Writing system: Bengali script

Language codes
- ISO 639-3: –
- Glottolog: vang1242

=== Names ===
The word "Mymensinghi" is locally pronounced as Momensinga and Moimensinga. It is also referred to as Mymensingiyo, Moymonsingha, Maimensingha or simply Mymensingh.

=== Geographical distribution ===
The Mymensinghi dialect is common in almost all districts of Mymensingh Division of Bangladesh. It is also spoken by many local residents of Kishoreganj and Tangail districts of Dhaka division outside Mymensingh division. Additionally, it is spoken by people in adjacent areas of the Meghalaya state in India, as well as the Gazipur, Kurigram and Sunamganj districts of Bangladesh.

=== Features and comparison ===
Features: The Mymensinghi dialect shows mostly the same features as eastern dialects of Bengali as mentioned above.

Comparison: A comparison of Standard Bengali and two Eastern Bengali dialects are presented below:

English	Standard Bengali	Eastern Bengali	
English	Standard Bengali	Mymensinghi	Dhakaiya
Together/With	Sathe (সাথে), Soṅge (সঙ্গে)	Loge (লগে)	Loge (লগে)
He	Shē (সে)	Hē (হে)	Hē (হে)
Taka	Ṭaka (টাকা)	Ṭæha (ট্যাহা)	Ṭæka (ট্যাকা)
Dhaka	Ḍhaka (ঢাকা)	Ḍaha (ঢাহা)	Ḍaka (ঢাকা)
Good	Bhalo (ভালো)	Bala (ভালা)	Balo (ভালো), Bala (ভালা)
Pain	Bætha (ব্যাথা), Bedona (বেদনা)	Bædna (ব্যাদনা)	Bædna (ব্যাদনা), Bætha (ব্যাথা)
Medicine	Oṣudh (ওষুধ)	Oṣud (ওষুদ)	Oṣud (ওষুদ)
Person	Lok (লোক)	Beḍa (বেডা), Luk (লুক)	Beṭa (বেটা), Luk (লুক)
Boy/Son	Chhele (ছেলে), Putro (পুত্র), Chhoṛa (ছোঁড়া)	Put (পুত), Chhera (ছেরা)	Put (পুত), Pola (পোলা), Chhera (ছেরা)
Girl/Daughter	Meye (মেয়ে), Konya (কন্যা), Chhuṛi (ছুঁড়ী)	Maiya (মাইয়া), Chheri (ছেরী)	Maiya/Meya (মাইয়া/মেয়া), Chheri (ছেরী)
Broom	Jhaṛu (ঝাড়ু), Jhaṭa (ঝাটা)	Hasun (হাছুন), Jaḍa (ঝাডা)	Hachun (হাচুন), Jaru (ঝাড়ু)
I Will eat	Ami khabo (আমি খাবো)	Ami khamu/khayam (আমি খামু/খায়াম)	Ami khamu (আমি খামু)
I am eating	Ami khacchhi/khaitechhi (আমি খাচ্ছি/খাইতেছি)	Ami khaitasi (আমি খাইতাছি)	Ami khaitasi (আমি খাইতাছি)

== Bibliography ==
- Chatterji, Suniti Kumar (1926), The Origin and Development of the Bengali Language, Calcutta University Press
- Chatterji, Suniti Kumar (1931). "Recursives in New Indo-Aryan". Indian Linguistics. I: 15–44.
- Haldar, Gopal (1929). "A Brief Phonetic Sketch of the Noakhali Dialect of South-Eastern Bengali". Journal of the Department of Letters. XIX: 1–40.
- Haldar, Gopal (1986), A Comparative Grammar of East Bengali Dialects, Puthipatra
- Masica, Colin P. (1991), The Indo-Aryan Languages, Cambridge University Press
- Pal, Animesh K. (1965). "Phonemes of a Dacca Dialect of Eastern Bengali and the Importance of Tone". Journal of the Asiatic Society. VII: 39–48.
- Ray, Punya Sloka; Hai, Muhammad Abdul; Ray, Lila (1966), Bengali Language Handbook, Center for Applied Linguistics
- Sen, Sukumar (1957), ভাষার ইতিবৃত্ত (in Bengali), পাঁচুগোপাল রায়
- Shahidullah, Muhammad (1958), বাঙ্গালা ভাষার ইতিবৃত্ত (in Bengali), মাওলা ব্রাদার্স
- Shahidullah, Muhammad (1965), বাংলাদেশের আঞ্চলিক ভাষার অভিধান (in Bengali), বাংলা একাডেমী
- Učida, Norihiko (1970), Der Bengali Dialekte von Chittagong (in German), Otto Harrassowitz
- Grierson, G A, ed. (1903). Linguistic Survey of India: Indo-Aryan Family Eastern Group. Vol. V. Archived from the original on 27 June 2020.
