= Kurmukar language =

Bengali-Assamese language variety of India

Kurmukar
- Native to: India
- Native speakers: (3,000 cited 2000)
- Language family: Indo-European: Indo-Iranian; Indo-Aryan; Eastern; Bengali–Assamese; Gauda-Banga; Bengali?; Kurmukar

Language codes
- ISO 639-3: kfv
- Glottolog: kurm1243

Kurmukar is a Bengali-Assamese variety that is related to and perhaps a dialect of Bengali language spoken in parts of Assam, West Bengal, Tripura and Bihar.
