= Bengali–Assamese languages =

Sub group of the Indo-Aryan languages in the Indian subcontinent

Bengali-Assamese
- Gauda–Kamarupa
- Geographic distribution: Bangladesh, India, Myanmar, Nepal
- Linguistic classification: Indo-European: Indo-Iranian; Indo-Aryan; Eastern; Odia–Bengali-Assamese; Bengali-Assamese
- Early form: Magadhi Prakrit

Language codes
- Glottolog: gaud1237 Gauda–Kamrupa

The Bengali-Assamese languages (also Gauda–Kamarupa languages) is a grouping of several languages in the eastern Indian subcontinent. This group belongs to the Eastern zone of Indo-Aryan languages. The languages in this group, according to Glottolog, include Assamese, Bengali, Bishnupriya, Chakma, Chittagonian, Hajong, Kewat, Kharia Thar, Kurmukar, Lodhi, Mal Paharia, Noakhali, Rajbanshi, Rangpuri, Rohingya, Sylheti, Tangchangya and Surjapuri.

== Languages ==
Language	Native name	Script	Alphabet	Number of speakers (in millions)	Native region
Assamese	অসমীয়া Ôxômīyā	Bengali–Assamese script	Assamese alphabet	15.3	India (Assam)
Bengali	বাংলা Bāṅglā	Bengali–Assamese script	Bengali alphabet	261.8	Bangladesh (national and official); India (West Bengal, Jharkhand, Tripura, parts of Assam, Andaman and Nicobar Islands)
Bishnupriya Manipuri	বিষ্ণুপ্রিয়া মণিপুরী বিষ্ণুপ্রিয়া মৈতৈ বিষ্ণুপ্রিয়া মায়াং ইমার ঠার; Biṣṇupriyā Maṇipurī; Biṣṇupriyā Me'itei; Biṣṇupriyā; Māẏāṅg; Imār Ṭhār	Bengali–Assamese script	Bengali alphabet	0.12 (total)	India (Assam, Manipur and Tripura); Bangladesh (Sylhet Division)
Chakma	𑄌𑄋𑄴𑄟 𑄌𑄇𑄴𑄟 চাকমা চাঙমা Sākmā; Sāṅgmā	Chakma script Bengali–Assamese script Latin script	Chakma alphabet Bengali alphabet	0.32	Bangladesh (Chittagong Division); India (Mizoram and Tripura); Myanmar (Rakhine State)
Chittagonian	চাটগাঁইয়া চিটাইঙ্গা Saṭgãia; Siṭaiṅga	Bengali–Assamese script Arabic script Latin script	Bengali alphabet	13	Bangladesh (Chittagong Division); Myanmar (Rakhine State); India (Tripura)
Hajong	হাজং Hāzoṅg	Bengali–Assamese script Latin script	Assamese alphabet Bengali alphabet	0.06	India (Assam and Meghalaya); Bangladesh (Mymensingh Division)
Kamtapuri/ Rangpuri/ Rajbanshi	কামতাপুৰী কামতা অংপুরী অমপুরী ৰাজবংশী राजबंशी ताजपुरीया Kāmtāpurī; Kāmtā; Ôṅgpurī; Ômpurī; Rājbaṅśī; Tājpurīyā	Bengali–Assamese script, Devanagari	Bengali alphabet, Assamese alphabet	10.8	Bangladesh (Rangpur Division); India (West Bengal and Assam); Nepal (Koshi Province)
Noakhali	নোয়াখাইল্লা নোয়াখাইল্যা Nōẇākhāillā	Bengali–Assamese script Latin script	Bengali alphabet	7	Bangladesh (Greater Noakhali); India (Tripura)
Rohingya	رُحَ࣪ڠۡگَ࣪ࢬ 𐴌𐴗𐴥𐴝𐴙𐴚𐴒𐴙𐴝; Ruáingga	Arabic script Hanifi script Latin script	Arabic alphabet Hanifi alphabet Latin alphabet	2.52	Myanmar (Rakhine State); Bangladesh (Chittagong Division)
Surjapuri	सुरजापुरी সুরজাপুরী Surjāpurī	Devanagari; Bengali–Assamese script	Bengali alphabet	2.26	India (Bihar, West Bengal) Nepal (Koshi Province)
Sylheti	ꠍꠤꠟꠐꠤ সিলেটি Silôṭi Sileṭi	Bengali–Assamese script Sylheti Nagari script	Sylheti alphabet	11.8	Bangladesh (Sylhet Division); India (Assam, Meghalaya, North Tripura)
Tanchangya	𑄖𑄧𑄐𑄴𑄌𑄧𑄁𑄉𑄴𑄡 তঞ্চংগ্যা Tôñchôṅgyā	Bengali script Chakma script	Chakma alphabet Bengali alphabet	0.02	Bangladesh (Chittagong Hill Tracts)

== Language comparison chart ==
* = borrowed terms (including tatsamas, ardhatatsamas and other borrowings)

English	Assamese	Bengali	Chakma	Chittagonian	Hajong	Kamatapuri	Noakhali	Rohingya	Sylheti
beautiful	dhunia, xundor/xundar	śundor*	dol	dishar, šundor			hundor*	cúndor*, hásin*	šundor*, kubsurot*, mayasurot
big	daṅor/daṅar, bor	boṛo, ḍagor, ḍaṅor		đôñr		boro, daṅar	boḍḍa	boro, ákbor*, kobira*	boṛo
blood	tez	rôkto*, khun*, lohu	lo	lou, rôktô			lou, khun*, rokto*	lou, hún*, kún*	lou, roxto*, kun*
bread	ruti (flat), pau*ruti, luf*, bred*	pão*ruṭi, ruṭi (flat)		fõruţi				fiçá, luthi	ruṭi (flat), luf*
brother	bhai (younger), kokai/kaka (elder), dada (elder)*	bhai, dada, bhaiya		bái, bôdda		bhai	bái	bái	bái, báia, dada
cat	mekuri/meukri/mekur, birali/biroli, biral	biṛal/beṛal, bilai/bilei		bilai/bilei, miúr			bilai	bilai	mekur, bilai
dark	andhar, endhar	ãdhar, andhar, ondhokar*		ãdár			ãdar	añdár, miyonda	andáir
daughter	zi, mai, aapi, zhia, ziori	maiya/meye, konna*, jhi		zee, maifuā		beti	maiya	futúni, zíi	zi, fuṛi, maiya, mei, puṛi, beṭi, xoinna
day	din, bêla	din, bêla*, roz*, dibôš*		din		din	din, hokalbêla*, beinna	din	din, ruz*
dog	kukur	kukur, kutta		kuĩr, kutto			kutta	kuñr	atu, kutta, kukur
door	duar*, dorza*, dar	dôroja/dôrja*, duar*		duōr, kebar		duar*		duar*	xeir, dorza*, duar*
earth	bhũi, p(r)ithiwi/p(r)ithibi*	duniya*, prithibi*, dhora*, jahan*		duniye, fitibi			duniya*, fitibi*	duniyai*	duniai*, dunia*, zahan*, fiṭibi*
egg	koni, dima/dim	ḍim, anḍa, boida*	boda*	đim,anḍa		ḍima	bôyza*	andha, dhim	enḍa, ḍim, boida*
elephant	hati/hathi	hati		áti		hati	áti	áñti, háñtih	átt
eye	soku, sokhu	choukh/chokh, ãkhi, noyon*, chokkhu*		sóg			sok, sokku	suk	soku, uki, souk
father	deuta*, bap, büpai/bapa, pitai/pite/piti*, aba/abba/abu/abbu*	bap, abba*, baba, abbu, pita*, waled*		baf, ba, abba			baf, abba*	abbá*	baf, bazi, abba*, abbu*
fear	bhoy, dor	bhôy*, ḍor		đôr			ḍor	ḍor	ḍor
finger	aṅuli/aṅli	aṅgul, onguli*		ôuñl	ouñl	aṅgul			aṅguil
fire	zui, aguni*	aguin/agun, ogni*, nar*, atosh*, anol*, pabok*, dahon*		ôin*		zui		ooin*	aguin*, nar*, atosh*
fish	mas	machh		mas		mas		mas	mas, mai*
food	khüabostu*, khauni, ahar*, khayddo*, khana*	khabar, khaon, khana*, khani*, khaddo*, ahar*		hána		hána, háñna	hána, khána	xani	xani
god	bhogowan*, is(s)or*, deu, probhu*, khuda*	khoda*, isshôr*, bhôgôban*, srishtikorta*, mabud*		khúda*,rôb, ūôr ôla			khúda*, rôb, moula*	ila*, rob*, ixor*	mobud*, mola*, rob*, xoda*, bhogòban*
good	bhal	bhalo/bhala, bála/bala, balo		bála, gôm	bhala	bhal	bala	gom	bála
grass	ghah, kher (hay)	ghash, khôṛ (hay)		kér		ghaṣ		kérr	ga, gaš
hand	hat	hat		át		hat	át	árt	át
hand fan	bisoni/biseni/bisni	hat-pakha, biuni, bijoni		bisôin, bisein			hanka, át-hanka		bisoin, fanka, faxa, át-faxa
head	mur, matha, math	matha, shir*, kolla*		mata, hôlla				matá	sir*, xolla*, mata
heart (emotion)	hia, ontor*, koliza/koilza, hidoy*	(h)ridôy*, ôntôr*, hiya, dil*, kolob*, kolija/koilja		dil*, hôilze, ridôy, ôntôr			dil*, ôntôr*	dil*	dil*, hia
heart (organ)	hia, dil, amothu	(h)ritpindô*,dil*, kolija/koilja						dil*	gurda
horse	ghü̃ra/ghora	ghoṛa		gúṛa				gúñra, gúra	gúṛa
house	ghor	ghôr, baṛi, basha, khana*		gór			gór, bari	gor, bari	gór, bari, xan*
hunger	bhük/bhokh	khudha*, khida*, khide*, bhuk		búk			buk	búk	buk, feto(r) buk
language	bhaxa*, mat (call), kotha*, raw	bhasha*, buli, jôban/zôban*	hodá*	basha, zúban, buli		raw, bhaṣa*	basha, buli	zoban*, hodá*	mat, bul, rau, zoban*, basha*
laughter	hãhi	hashi		aši		haṣi			aši
life	zion/ziwon, ziu (soul), hayat*	jibôn*, jindegi*, hayat*		zibon,zindegi*,hayat*		zibon	zindagi*, zibon		zindegi*, zibon*, hayat*
moon	zün, sand	chãd/chand, chôndro*, bôdôr*, shôshi*		sãn	san		sanni	san	san(d), sondoni
mother	ma, ai, mai, mao, ammi/amma*	ma, amma*, ammu, waleda*, mata*, ai		ma		maö, ai	ma, amma*		mai, ai, maizi, ma, amma*, ammu
mouth	mukh*, mu-	mukh*, mu(h)		mukh*		muk*			muk*
name	nam, naü	nam		nam			nam	nam	nam
night	rati, nixa*	rat/rait, ratri*, shob*		rait		rati	rait	rait	rait, rati, nii, shob*, lailot*
no	nohoy, nai, ühü, na	na, nai/nae/nei, noy, non		nô, nôy			nô	nô, nôy	na, nai/nae, nay
peace	xanti*, xokah	shanti*, aman*, salamôt*		šanti*		ṣanti*			niraii, shanti*, salamôt*
place	thai, zega/zaga*, than	jayga/jaga/jega*, ṭhai, sthan*		ṭai, zāga*					zega*, tan
queen	rani, madoi, patmadoi	rani, shahbanu*		rani		rani	rani	rani	rani, razbibi, sha(h)banu*
rest	zironi, aram*	aram*, bisram*, jirano*, jiron*		dom*,zirôn,aram gôrôn					zirani, aram*
river	noi, gaṅ, nodi*	nôdi*, doriya*, ɡaṅg		dôijja*,dôirge				hál	ɡaṅg, nodi*
road	bat, ali, rasta*, poth*	rasta*, shoṛok, pôth*					sorok, hot*		sorox, rah*, rasta*, ail, fot*
salt	nimokh*, lün/nun	lôbôn*, nun, nomok*		lôbôn*, lun/nun			noon, lobon*		nimox*, nun, lobon*
sister	bhoni/boini/boni (younger), ba/bai (elder)	apa*, apu/api, boin/bon, didi		bóin,afa/bôbbu/dî/afu (elder)			bóin		bóin, buai, bubu, afa*, apu/api
small	xoru, süto	chhoṭo, pati		guro			huru, suto		huru, nii, kuṭimuti, gura, titkina, geda, suṭu, soṭo, suṭo, furu
son	put, pü, aapa	chhele, putro*, put, po, bêṭa, pola, chheṛa, pua		(morod) fuā, fut		beṭa	hola, hut	fut	fut, fua, fola, pua, sele*
soul	ziu, atma/atta*	atta*, pran*, pôran*, ruh*, jiu		foran*, rû*			atta*		ru*, atma*, zaan*
sun	beli	shurjo*, shuruj*		beil, šuroz*				beil	shuruz*, shurzo*, shurjo*, royd*
ten	doh, dos*	dosh		doš		doṣ	dosh		dosh, do
three	tini	tin, tini		tín			tin	tin	tin
village	gaü̃	gram*, gã, gão		geram			geram		gau
waist	kõkal/kakal	komor*, maja		keĩl				keñil	xomor*, xaxal
water	pani	pani, jôl*		fani	pani	pani, zol*	hani	faní	fani, ab*, tam, pani
when	ketia/kitia/kita, kethan/kethen, kesen, ketiyake	kôkhôn, kobe, kon shômôy*, kon bêla		hótte		könbela	kunbela		kunbala(n->m), kunomoy
wind	botah/batah	batash*, hawa*, ba/bao, bayu*, bat*, anil*		ába*, bataš*			batash*, haowa*		boyar, (boiar) batash*, hawa*
wolf	kukurnesia bagh, xial (jackal, fox)	nekṛe-bagh, sheyal/shiyal (jackal, fox)		neṛi kutta					atubag, hial (jackal, fox)
woman	maiki manuh, tiri*, tirüta, mohila*	mohila*, nari*, beṭi manush, chheri		maiye fua,maifuā (soft)		beṭi saöa			beṭi, moíla*
year	bosor, son*	bochhor, shal*, borsho*, botshor*		bosor		bosor	bosor, shal*		fira, bosor, son*, shal*
yes	hoy, o, ü̃, mm	hê/hễ, ji*, agge, hã		ô, ôy			ô, hô	ô, ôy	óe (óy), i, zi*/ji* óe (óy)
yesterday	kali, züa-kali/zawa-kali	(goto*-)kal(-ke), (gelo-)kal(-ke),kal(-ke)		goto* hail, goto* halia					(gese-)xail(-ku), xail(-ku)
English	Assamese	Bengali	Chakma	Chittagonian	Hajong	Kamatapuri	Noakhali	Rohingya	Sylheti

* = borrowed terms (including tatsamas, ardhatatsamas and other borrowings)

=== Verbs ===
English	Assamese	Sylheti	Bengali	Chakma	Chittagonian	Kamatapuri	Rohingya	Hajong	Noakhali
ask	xudh-, xudhpus kor- (investigate)	zika-, fus-, zar-	jiggaśa kor-, puchh-, puch kor-, jiggesh kor-, jiga-		pũsar ɡor-				fus-, jiga-
bite	kamür-, kamür mar-	xamṛa-, xamor	kamoṛ mar-, kamṛa-		hõr-				
blow	phu de-, phuk-, phu kor-	fu de-, hu de-	phu deua-						
breathe	uxah lo-	dom lo-	šãš ne-, šãš lo-, dôm ne-, dôm lo-						šãš ne-, dôm ne-
bring	an-	an-	an-		an-				an-
can	par-	far-	par-						har-
catch	dhor-	dór-	dhôr-						dór-
come	ah-	a-	aś-		a-		a-	ah-	ai-
count	gon-, hisap kor-, gonti kor-	gon-, isab xor-	gon-, hišab kôr-						
cry	kand-, kan-	xand-, xan-	kãd-		hãd-				hãnna-, kand-, sikrait-
cut	kat-	xaṭ-	kaṭ-						
do	kor-	xor-	kôr-		gor-		ɡor-		hor-, kor-
die	mor-, dhuka-	mor-	môr-		mor-				mor-
dig	khand-	kur-, kus-	khõṛ-, khõc-						
drink	kha-, pi kha-, pi-	xa-, fia xa-, fi-	kha-, pan kor-, pi-						ha-
eat	kha-	xa-	kha-				há-		ha-
fall	por-	foṛ-	poṛ-						
fear	bhoy kha-, dora-	ḍora-	bhoy pa-, ḍora-						dora-
fight	zũz-, maramari/moramori kor-	mair xor-, xaijja xor-	maramari kor-, jhogṛa kôr-						
float	üpoṅ-, bhah-	bai-, bo-	bhaš-						
flow	bo-	bo-	bo-						bo-
fly	ur-	uṛ-	uṛ-		ur-		ur-		ur-
give	de-, di-	de-, di-	de-						de-
go	za-, ɡo-/ge-	za-, ɡo-, ɡe-	ja-, ɡe-		za-, zo-		za-, zo-		za-
happen	ho-	ó-	ho-		ó-				ó-
hear	xun-	hun-	śun-		un-				hun-, hon-
hit	mar-, pit-, kila-	mar-, fiț-, kila-	mar-, kela-						mar-
kill	mar-, mari pela-	mar-, mari de-	mar-, mere fel-, mariya fal-						mariya de-
know	zan-	zan-	jan-						zan-
laugh	hãh-	aś-	haś-		aś-				
learn	xik-, xikh-	hik-	śekh-, śikh-					hik-	
lie (in bed)	baɡor-, kati ho-, bisonat/bisnat por-	xait o-, hut-	shuye por-						hut-
live	thak-, zi(ai) thak-, tik-, basi thak-	tax-, zia-, basi tax-	thak-, jibito thak-, jinda thak-, bece thak-, bãchiya thak-		thah-				thak-
look	sa-	sa-	dekh-, ca-, taka-		sa-				sa-, deha-, taka-
open	khul-	kúa-, kúl-	khol-, khul-		uid-, khúl-				
play	khel-	xél-	khel-						
pull	tan-	ṭan-	ṭan-						tan-
push	thel-	ṭel-, dekka-	ṭhel-						thel-, dakka-
read	porh/poh/por-	foṛ-	poṛ-		foṛ-				hor-
run	dour-, daur-	douṛ-	douṛa-, choṭ-, chuṭ-		dũr-				dour-
say	ko-, mat-, bul-	xo-, mat-	bol-, ko-	ho-	ho-				ho-
scratch	ãsür-	xawza-, xamsa-	ãcoṛ de-, ãcṛa-, khamca-						
see	dekh-	dex-	dekh-		sa-				sa-
sew	xi-, sila-, bo- (weave)	sia-	śela-, śila						
sing	ɡa-, gan ga-	ɡa-	ɡa-, gan ga-						ga-
sit	boh-	bo-	boś-		bo-				bo-, boy-
sleep	xu-, ɡhuma-, tüponi za/mar-	hut-, ɡúma-	ɡhuma-, śo-, śu-		ɡhum za-				hute za-, gúma-
smell	xuṅ-	huṅ(ɡ)-	śũk-, śõk-		ũ-				shũk-
spit	thu pela-, pik-, pik pela-	sef fal-, fik fal- (betel nut/leaf)	thu phel-, thu phal-						seb hela-, thu hela-
split	phal-	atra-	bhag kor-, bhang-						do bhag kor-, bhang-
squeeze	sep-, hẽs-	sif-	cap-, pesh-, cip-						sap-
stand	thio ho-, thia-	uba-	dãṛa-, khaṛa-			thio-	tía-		dãṛa-, khaṛa-
stab	khũs-, han-	kus-, gauua-							
suck	suh-, sup-, xüh-	sua-	chosh-, chush-						
swell		ful-, fit-			phuler				
swim	xatũr-	hatra-	śatar kor-, shatra-						
think	bhab-, sinta kor-, sint-	bab-, sinta xor-, mone kôr-	bhab-, cinta kôr-, mone kôr-						bab-, sinta hor-
throw	dolia-	ița-, iṭa mar-	chõṛ-, ḍhêla mar-, dol-						sūre mar-
tie	bandh-	ban(d)-	bãdh-						bãn(d)-
vomit	bomi kor-	bait xor-, bomi xor-	bomi kor-						bomi hor-
walk	khüz karh-, bul-	aṭ-	hãṭ-		ãd-				at-
want	lag-, bisar-	maɡ-, sa-	ca-		sa-				sa-
wash	dhu-	dó-	dho-				dú-		dú-
wipe	mos-, müs-	fus-, mus-	moch-, much-, poch-, puch-						mus-
English	Assamese	Sylheti	Bengali	Chakma	Chittagonian	Kamatapuri	Rohingya	Hajong	Noakhali

== See also ==
- Bangladeshi Manipuri language
- Assamese Manipuri language

== Bibliography ==
- Hajong, Abonis; Phillips, D; Phillips, V (2008), Hajong–English Phrase Book (PDF), SIL International
- Pradhani, Jyotirmoy (2012). "Resonance of Identity in Rajbanshi Poetry" (PDF). The NEHU Journal. X (1).
