= Bagal (caste) =

Cattle herding caste of India

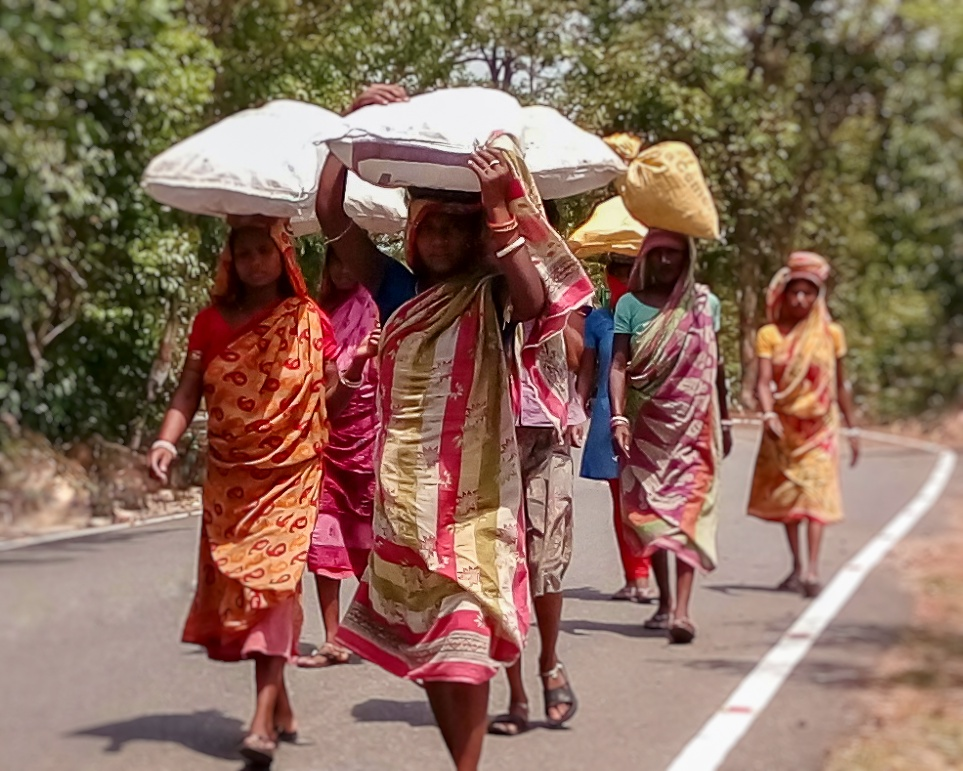
- Bagal women are returning from forest after collecting Sal leaves.
- Religions: Folk Hinduism
- Languages: L1 – Kudmali/ Bengali (Manbhumi dialect) (Note: According to Singh (1998)/Singh (2012), the Bagals of Jharkhand speak Jharkhandi Bengali, Kudmali, or Goudali dialects, while the Bagals of Odisha speak Odia. Additionally, Singh & Manoharan (1993) acknowledge Kurmali as the mother tongue of the Bagals in Jharkhand. Chakraborty (2012) states that the Bagals residing in the undivided Paschim Medinipur district of West Bengal speak a corrupted form of Bengali, which they refer to as Bagali Bhasa (Bagal language) and they also multilingually speak Mundari (Bhumij), Santali and Nagpuri (Sadri). In the 1931 census of Mayurbhanj state, the Bagals were primarily recorded as Odia speakers, though it not being their native language. Overall, the language or dialect they speak as their mother tongue is highly similar to the Bengali Manbhumi dialect, with variations in local accents and word usage. It incorporates a significant number of lexical items, grammatical markers, and categories originating from the Sadanic language family, such as Nagpuri (Sadri), Kurmali, and Khortha. Consequently, the classification of the language they speak as either a dialect of Kurmali or Bengali or a distinct but related language remains a matter of linguistic debate. However, due to their migration and settlement in contiguous border areas of three distinct linguistic administrative states, language shift becomes an unavoidable factor. This results in the adoption of the Bengali structure in Bengal, the Odia structure in Odisha, and the Hindi structure in Jharkhand. As a result, during the census, when asked about their mother tongue, individuals identify themselves as speakers of the respective state administrative languages, instead of actual mother tongue.); L2 – Hindi, Odia, Bengali
- Country: India
- Populated states: Jharkhand, Odisha, West Bengal
- Region: Balasore, Mayurbhanj, Paschim Medinipur, Jhargram, Purulia, East Singhbhum, Sareikela Kharsawan
- Related groups: Bhumij, (Note: Although the Bhumija are a section of the Munda ethnic group, but they are greatly Hinduised and climbed the social ladder. Even they secured the position of Raja, Sardar, Zamindar in Dhalbhum region and also tried to Kshatriyaise themselves. In this process they left their own language Bhumij, an Austroasiatic family language and shifted to prestigious Indo-Aryan language like Bengali and Odia. In this way the Bhumija of Mayurbhanj district share common ancestral territory with the Bagals, for example Bhumij group of Mayurbhanj is Tamaria Bhumija, Barabhuiya/Barabhumia Bhumija, Haldipukuria Bhumija. So they became close to each other because of common language, migration history, socio-cultural behaviour, social status in the regional society and process of sanskritisation to climb Hindu social ladder in new settlement. The Bagals also interdine with other neighbouring tribes and lower rank communities, except the "upper" caste and those who accepts flesh of cattle.) Munda, Rajwar, Mahato
- Historical grouping: Pastoralist Caste, Serving Caste, Aboriginal race, Tribal Hindu (Note: Historically Bagals are classified differently in different administrative regions of British India with respect to different time period. Such as in 1877, Bagals of Manbhum are classified as Pastoralist Caste. In 1891 census year, Bagals of Manbhum are classified as Serving Caste. In 1931, Bagals of Bengal are classified as Aboriginal race and Bagals of Mayurbhanj State are classified as Tribal Hindus. Although Bagals of Mayurbhanj state were previously classified as Caste Hindus, which was a classification error acknowledged by author in later publication. (Note: Laeequddin (1937), p. 173) In the 1992 ethnographic project "The People of India", the Bagals of Bihar (present-day Jharkhand) are grouped into two categories: Animal Husbandry and Labourers.)

Bagal (pronounced as Bāgāl) is a cattle herding caste of East India. Bagal people are living in the states of West Bengal, Jharkhand and Odisha. They use Kudmali/ Manbhumi dialect of Bengali as their mother tongue (with local variations, labelled as Bagal Bhasa) and use Bengali, Hindi and Odia language to communicate with the outside society.

== Overview ==
Bagal is assumed as an ethnically tribe derived caste (semi-tribal/ semi-Hinduized Aboriginals). Their socio-cultural behaviour is blend of Hinduism and Animism, and they are one of the marginalized section of Indian society. Their primary concentration in the valley region of the Subarnarekha, i.e., in Balasore, Mayurbhanj, Paschim Medinipur, Jhargram, East Singhbhum, Saraikela Kharsawan and Purulia districts of East India.

They are believed to have undergone various socio-cultural purification processes during the Sanskritization movement in India. However, due to their animistic (in other words, non-Vedic Hinduism) behaviors, they are relatively considered inferior in the Hindu social hierarchy and often referred to as Adivasis. They also acknowledge their subordinate status in society due to various socio-historical factors.

=== Etymology ===
The term "Bagal" is pronounced as Bāgāl (Pronunciation: /bɑːɡɑːl/; বাগাল), which is a Bengali (or Kudmali) word and carries the literal meaning of "herder". In Odia it is pronounced as Bagāḻa (Odia pronunciation: [bɔgaɭɔ]; ବଗାଳ), which has the same meaning and has its roots in the Singhbhum-Manbhum region.

It specifically refers to individuals who are responsible for tending to and grazing domestic animals in villages, primarily cattle. Typically, adolescent boys are employed in this activity under contractual agreements with landowners as Rakhal/Baromasia. They, along with cattle-herding, undertake various household chores.

=== Population ===
The Registrar General and Census Commissioner of India currently do not consider caste as a significant factor due to policy for the Census of India, except for Scheduled Castes and Scheduled Tribes. As a consequence, comprehensive and up-to-date information regarding the caste composition of the population is currently unavailable. It is noteworthy that the last instance in which caste was systematically recorded as a census category occurred in 1931, prior to India's independence. The Mayurbhanj State census 1931 recorded a total of 1621 people living in Mayurbhanj state i.e., 1321 form Baripada (chiefly from Barpara pargana), 234 from Kaptipada, 52 from Bamanghati and 14 from Panchpir subdivision. (Note: The Mayurbhanj state census also grouped together 355 Ahir Gaura individuals (who are distinct from the Ahir of Bihar and Gaura (Gopal) of Odisha) with the Bagal caste, considering them as possible synonyms of the Bagals of Mayurbhanj. In that census, the Bagals and Ahir Gaura together formed a total of 1,976, while in 1901, they numbered 2,020. Based on their features, the Ahir Gaura were described as allied to Kela and other gypsy castes. Over time, they adopted cattle herding and agriculture as means of livelihood. This information was later adopted in Singh edited "The People of India" ethnographic project, suggesting that Ahir Gaura is synonymous with Bagals of Odisha. However, in the British census, a total of 603 Ahir Gaura individuals were recorded in 1901. Among them, 300 were from the Orissa Tributary States. The remaining 303 were from the Orissa division, viz. 131 from Balasore, 124 from Cuttack, and 48 from Puri of British territory. Subsequently, following the 1911 census, the Ahir Gaura of Angul in the Bihar and Orissa Province were listed as Depressed Classes, a classification that was later extended to the entire province.) In the 1901 census, 12890 Bagal returned, that is 7884 from Medinipur, 1403 from Singhbhum, 1054 from Orissa Tributary States, 622 from Manbhum, 383 from Chota Nagpur Tributary States, 10 from Balasore and 5 from Puri, who are returned as Hindu. All those Bagals are included in Ahir (broadly tabulated in Ahir and Goala, due interchangeable use of those two terms (Note: The terms "Ahir" and "Goala" mean cattle herder in Sanskrit and Hindi/Bengali language, respectively and are often used interchangeably in Bihar. But in Bengal, the term "Ahir" is primarily used by individuals belonging to the Bihar, although many of them also interchangeably identify themselves as "Goala" according to local nomenclature. Similarly, in Odisha, the cattle herder caste is known as Gaura, while the migrant cattle herders were referred to as Ahir Gaura, to distinguish them from the Odisha counterparts. In the census, these types of smaller and ambiguous enumerations, such as Bagals, are grouped together with the established occupational nomenclature, although they differ in hierarchical rank and social status. The 1901 census figures of Ahir also include 530 males and 548 females who identified as Animistic by religion. Among them, 1,051 individuals were recorded in Chota Nagpur Tributary States, 26 in the Ranchi and 1 in the Tributary States of Orissa. The Mayurbhanj state census also emphasized this fact in this way: "It has been observed above that the Goalas style themselves Gohalas in this State, [with a total population of 228, mostly from Muruda pargana]. (Note: Laeequddin (1935), pp. 123–124) The two names are interchangeable, in the same way as Goala is interchangeable with Ahir. Various aboriginal tribes in the Chhotanagpur plateau have gradually come to be known as Goala, though they do not belong to the true Goala caste. In 1901, the figures for Mahakur were included in Goala, the Mahakurs being described as a wandering tribe who hailed from Orissa and came into the jungles of Ranchi district to graze buffaloes.") and Ahir also includes 4299 Mahkur i.e. 4159 from Chota Nagpur tributary state and 140 from Ranchi; 91 Khandwal from Singhbhum) except Bankura where 1529 Bagals are included in Bauri. In 1911, 4581 Bagal returned from Medinipur, 88 from Monghyr, 1 from Bhagalpur, included in Goala and 730 Bagal from Bankura, included in Bauri. In the 1891 census, a total of 9,674 Bagals returned from the Chota Nagpur Division and Feudatory States, with 8,364 being Hindus from Chota Nagpur divisional districts, including 6,179 from Singhbhum (5819 – Dhalbhum/Ghatshila and 360 – Chakradharpur), 2,180 from Manbhum (912 – Barabhum, 320 – Baghmundi, 224 – Para, 210 – Chandil, 203 – Jhalda, and 200 – Purulia, 111 – Manbazar), 5 from Lohardaga-Palamu, and 1,300 from the Feudatory States. Additionally, the census also noted a total of 15,049 Bagals in the marriage table, with specific distributions in Medinipur (6,191), Singhbhum (5,819), Manbhum (1,543), and Bankura (1,496). In 1872, 2077 Bagals returned from Manbhum and included as subdivision of Goala. However, In recent past Chakraborty (2012) estimated 20,000 Bagals living in undivided Medinipur district during his field work.

Census table (Note: The statistical data presented in the table may not be useful to estimate the current demographics as the census 1951, West Bengal mentioned that the Bauri and Goala has 'Bagal' named subcaste or Bagal caste was broadly grouped in those caste, which are again questionable in ethnographic point of views and Bagal is also a generic occupational term for "herder" in the Kurmali linguistic region. So the people of different communities who used to herd cattle, they are also synonymously known by the name Bagal and sometime use Bagal as a prefix or suffix along with the name of their community, such as Sabara Bagal, Rajuar Bagal and Bagal-Khandwal or Bagal (Khandwal) in Jharkhand, who are listed as "Backward Caste – I". But the tabulated statistical data bear greater footprint of present day Bagal caste.)
1909 map of Chota Nagpur region
State	Jharkhand		West Bengal			Odisha	Other
Region Year	Chota Nagpur Tributary States (Saraikela Kharsawan)	Singhbhum	Manbhum	Bankura	Medinipur	Orissa Tributary States (Mayurbhanj)	Other
1872	—N/a	—N/a	2,077	—N/a	—N/a	—N/a	—N/a
1891^{α}	–^{β}	6,179	2,180	—N/a	—N/a	1,300^{β}	5 – Lohardaga
1891^{α}	—N/a	5,819	1,543	1,496	6,191	—N/a	—N/a
1901^{γ}	383	1,403	622	1,529	7,884	1,054	10 – Balasore; 5 – Puri
1911	—N/a	—N/a	—N/a	730	4,581 (Note: In the 1911 census, 4,581 individuals identified as Bagals (comprising 2,076 males and 2,505 females) were recorded in Midnapore. Similarly, 2,154 individuals identified as Ahir (1,556 males and 598 females) were recorded in various regions, viz, Jalpaiguri (1,200, consisting of 1,070 Hindus—663 males and 407 females, and 130 Animists—65 males and 65 females), Rangpur (227), Mymensingh (170), Pabna (154), Dinajpur (160), Hill Tippera (92), Rajshahi (75), Faridpur (56), Bogra (51), Tippera (21), and Backergunge (2). However, both the Bagal and Ahir groups are included in Goala.)	—N/a	88 – Monghyr; 1 – Bhagalpur
1931	—N/a	—N/a	—N/a	—N/a	—N/a	1,621	—N/a
Included in Goala Included in Ahir Included in Bauri
	α. Bagal returned as Hindus and in context of actual occupation. β. 1,300 Bagals returned in Feudatory states, which include both Odisha and Chota Nagpur tributary states. γ. Bagals returned as Hindu religion believers. Note: In some cases the Singhbhum administrative region includes Dhalbhum and two Odia princely states Saraikela and Kharsawan. Similarly change in administration should be noted in other areas, such as Ichagarh, Patamda and Chandil of Manbhum.						

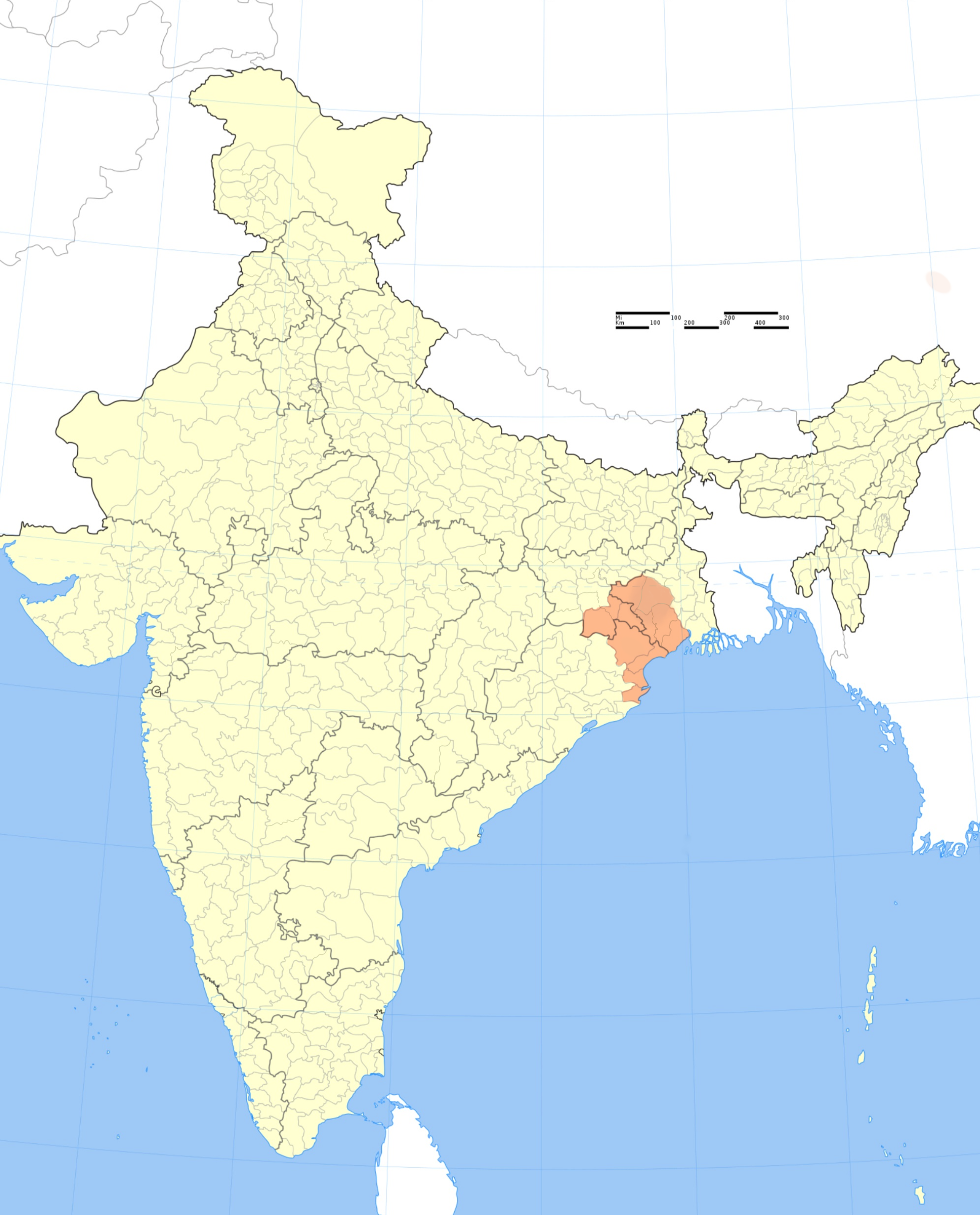
The region inhabited by Bagals indicated in deep saffron colour.

Current distribution of Bagal people in India
State	District
Jharkhand	Ranchi, Saraikela Kharsawan, Paschim Singhbhum, Purba Singhbhum
West Bengal	Purulia, Bankura, Jhargram, Paschim Medinipur, Purba Medinipur
Odisha	Mayurbhanj, Balasore, Bhadrak, Kendrapada

Specifically their major concentration is in, but not confined to Ichagarh, Chandil, Saraikela, Adityapur (Gamarhia) and Gobindapur (Rajnagar) of Saraikela Kharsawan district, Golmuri-cum-Jugsalai and Potka of East Singhbhum district in Jharkhand; Ranibandh, Raipur, Sarenga, Simlapal of Bankura district, Nayagram, Sankrail, Gopiballavpur, Jhargram, Binpur of Jhargram district, Kharagpur, Debra, Pingla, Sabang, Keshiary, Narayangarh, Dantan of Paschim Medinipur district in West Bengal; Rasgobindpur, Muruda, Suliapada, Kuliana, Saraskana, Baripada, Badsahi, Betnati, Khunta, Samakhunta, Udala, Kaptipada of Mayurbhanj district, Balasore, Remuna, Nilagiri of Balasore district, Bhadrak of Bhadrak district, Mahakalpada of Kendrapara district in Odisha.

=== Social structure ===
The Bagal people, currently being agriculturists, assert themselves in the middle range of the caste hierarchy in the varna system. Though they are relatively regarded as an unclean caste by the caste-based society, specifically by the upper Hindu castes and as a semi-clean caste by the Munda ethnolinguistic tribal community. For instance, in their agricultural operations, only members of the Munda ethnolinguistic tribes work for them and often exchange labour. Conversely, the caste-based society, including those from the Hinduized Indo-Aryan ethnolinguistic tribes, accept Bagals as labourers, but vice versa isn't accepted. Similar norms are followed regarding food habits and socio-cultural activities. In a broader sense, they fall into the liminal stage of outside and the lower stratum of four-varna system.

Though the Bagals call themselves Gopas, the "higher" Hindu castes do not regard them as proper sat-sudras, but do not explicitly state that they are asat-sudras or antyajas. From their features it seems that Bagals have descended from tribal pastoralists and become Hinduized. Radhiya Brahmans do not serve them ritually but Madhya-desiya and Utkal Brahmans do. The Bagals of rural areas are either subsistence farmers or landless agricultural labourers. None of them are seen these days to depend on cattle rearing, their traditional calling.

— West Bengal District Gazetteers : Puruliya (1985), p. 143

There are four endogamous subdivision of Bagal society namely Ahir Bagal, Khanroal Bagal, Krishna Bagal and Magadha Bagal. (Note: According to Singh (2012)/Singh (1998), the Bagal community is subdivided into Ahir Gop, Nanda Gop, Akhara Gop, and Krishna Gop. In contrast, as per Chakraborty (2012), they are referred to as Ahir Bagal, Magadha Bagal, Khanroal (Khandait) Bagal, and Krishna Bagal. These four groups are predominantly endogamous in nature, with each group asserting its distinct identity. In certain instances, their social status may change in accordance with the regional social hierarchy. However, it remains uncertain whether these four subdivisions ethnically belong to the same stock. It's also worth noting that, apart from the Magadha Bagal and the other three groups found in the undivided Medinipur district, tribal behavior is mostly associated with the Krishna Bagal group. The Bagals of Mayurbhanj do not recognize such divisions among themselves. Furthermore, there is no comprehensive anthropological report available apart from the Bagals of Midnapore, so the socio-cultural characteristics, social position, and formation history of the community may vary with respect to other regions and groups.) The major lineage clusters or sept (bansa) of Bagals of Midnapore includes Araikula (Arikuḷa), Banardiha, Bankuar, Buru Bhatua/Buruhatua, Bukria/Bukuria, Chardiha, Danadiha, Deoria (Deoḷia), Gutisukri/Butisukri, Hajombanda, Jetuar/Jegoar, Kurkutia, Manikdiha, Pathcom, Punihasa, Samdia, Sonahatu, Satvia, Sikaria, Tetla with variation in pronunciation and romanization. (Note: The standard character "ḷ" is used to accurately represent the Bagals vocabulary, which is the voiced retroflex lateral approximant (ɭ), "ळ" and "ଳ" phonemes in the Devanagari and Odia scripts, respectively. This sound is variously transcribed as "r", "l", and "d". For example, in Odia and Devanagari scripts, "କାଳା" and "काळा" means "buffaloes" in their dialect. It is also worth noting that although Devanagari has the phoneme "ळ", it is not commonly used in Hindi languages. But it's very much common in Munda and Dravidian language family. Additionally, Bengali does not have this sound. Instead use "ṛ" voiced retroflex flap (ɽ), "ড়" phonem in Bengali, which becomes the word "কাড়া".) Which are named after their ancestral territory, (Note: The lineage name used by Bagal people reflect their historical migration patterns, such as Pathcom from Patkum estate, Sikaria from Sikharbhum—an estate situated around Garh Panchkot, Sonahatu from Sonahatu, Hajombanda/Hajam Banta (modified from Banta Hajam) from Silli, Bankuar from the former Bankura region (or the totem of deer), and Banrdiha, Chardiha, Danadiha, Manikdiha, Samdiha/Samudiha, Purihasa, Tetla, etc. The suffix "dih" is a common element in many of these lineage names, which carries a literal meaning of upland or place of dwelling. The term "dihā" denotes the inhabitant of that specific location, and many of their lineage names are derived from Munda languages. Most of the regions associated with these lineage names are located in the southeastern part of the Jharkhand state, particularly within the area surrounded by Hundru hill, Ayodhya hill, and the Chandil-Gamharia Hill Range. It is worth noting that some of the Bagal people's clan and lineage bear a resemblance to the Bhumijas and Mundas, indicating possible historical ties or shared cultural elements.) any special events or activities of the lineage. Again those lineage clusters are composed of operational lineages such as Bankuar cluster comprising Baku Bankuar and Harin Bankuar, Pathcom comprising Baghamaria Pathcom and Rahe Pathcom, Bukuria comprising Bhitar Bukuria and Bahir Bukuria, Banrdiha comprising Gora Banrdiha and Kalia Banrdiha, etc. bearing both totemic clan (gotra) like Nag (snake), Sal (sal fish), Kachim (tortoise), Siyal (seal fish), Boni (boni bird), Singai (singai fish), Hans (swan) and non-totemic clan like Kashyapa, Sandilya. Buru Bhatua/ Buruhatua and Deoḷia lineage claim that they were the community level priest (Dehri) of the Bagal society. However, within Ahir Bagal and Khanroal (Khandait) Bagal, there is an absence of distinct lineage system; [sic] instead, they associate themselves with totemic clans (gotra). Additionally, there is a lack of available information concerning the Magadha Bagal.

As per Singh (1996) edited The People of India, the Bagals sub-divisional group are Ahir Gop, Akhara Gop, Krishna Gop, Nanda Gop bearing totemic clan Angaria (fire wood), Chawriya (deer), Dorhi (seed of Mahua), Kachima (tortoise) and Nag (snake), segmented into lineage Angaria, Chawniya, Dorhi, Nag in Bihar; Bankuar (a deer), Hajam Banta, Harma Bankuar, Jajo Bankuar (horn deer), Kurkutia (red weaver ant), Patkumia, Sikharia, Tentla in Odisha.

In general, each sub-divisional group predominantly practices endogamy, marrying within their own endogamous group or sub-caste. As for the descendants of the four endogamous groups in Bagal society, it is uncertain whether they originate from a single common ancestry or they are distinct from each other but use the generic occupational name Bagal. The primary distinction among these groups lies in their naming and kinship practices. Both the Ahir and Khanadit Bagal groups use the clan name (gotra) as the lineage name (bansa), treating them as interchangeable. In contrast, the Krishna Bagal group distinguishes between clan and lineage/sept. Unlike the Ahir and Khanadit Bagal groups, who consider the clan as an exogamous unit, the Krishna Bagal group views the lineage/sept as the exogamous unit.

=== Social organisation ===
The Bagal society follows a traditional caste council system known as Desh-Sabha, with the Mukhia serving as the head and the Digar and Dakua as assistants and messengers, respectively. Additionally, the Luthukhanria and Damgurguria act as law enforcement officers for the council. The council's main objective is to uphold the community's values and ethics, and those who violate these standards may face punishments such as excommunication, physical punishment, or payment of goods or bhoj.

In comparison, according to Singh (1998), the traditional caste council in the Bagal society is referred to as Bagal Samaj or Bagal Baisi, with the Majhi, Parmanik, and Desh Pradhan/Mahakur serving as the heads at the community, pargana, and regional levels, respectively. In their society, they have unique titles, such as Barbagal, Mahabagal, Mahakur and Dehri, which are assigned to individuals in recognition of their contributions to the community.

Although the traditional councils are no longer in use, some aspects of their practices continue to be incorporated into the Bagal society's daily life.

== History ==
=== Mythology ===
The myth of Bagals of Midnapore region is like that, Lord Krishna used to go to the pasture every day to graze the cattle. Sometimes he felt tired and wanted to be free from the monotonous work of daily cattle herding. So Lord Krishna made a 'Bagal' from sweat and dirt of his own body so that he could graze the cattle in the pastures every day. One day that Bagal shows some Munda people dancing in the Jungle, in the process of his routine job of cattle herding. Then the Bagal joined with them and fell in love with a Munda girl. After that the Bagal and Munda girl got married. Thus they believe that they are the progenitor of that couple. Being descendants of Lord Krishna, they also claim themselves as Krishna Gop/Krishna Bagal or Kistobagal according to Risley (1892).

=== Origin and occupation ===
The origin of the Bagal caste remains uncertain. As K. S. Singh believed that the Bagal people migrated from central India and they are one of the original settlers of erstwhile Singhbhum district of Bihar (now Jharkhand). From where they got their occupational name Bagal. Due to social instability in the region, they migrated to counterparts region Dhalbhum, Manbhum, Medinipur and Mayurbhanj of Bengal province for better livelihood. Whereas the Mayurbhanj State census 1931 noted as;

The Bagals are the cattle–herds. Herding cattle is their principal occupation. In the census of 1901, the Bagals of Medinapore ware included in the Ahir and Gohala, and those of Bankura in Bauri. In the caste-index prepared by Government for the province of Bihar and Orissa in the present census, Bagal has been listed [...] as a vague and indefinite entry [...]. There the Bagals have been described as the cow–herds of any caste. But a note has been left to the effect that they form a real caste in Mayurbhanj and Saraikela State, which is a fact. Through the large number of Bagals still follow their traditional occupation, many of them have taken to agriculture.

Additionally, in Odisha district Gazetteers : Mayurbhanj (1967), the Bagals are noted in this way;

In their manners and customs, they are like the Bhumijas and it is assumed that they had aboriginal descent. They also accept food from the Bhumijas.

And Marvin G. Davis noted as;

The Bagals are traditionally associated with work as cattle herders. In 1971, though, the Bagals of Torkotala village [in Midanapore] worked as agricultural laborers, cultivating smaller plots their own on the side. Based on their traditional association with cattle, the Bagals have recently advanced a claim to be Goalas by caste. It is unlikely that this claim will be recognized by other Hindus (of the village), though, at least not in the immediate future, for Sadgops are aware that their own caste is regarded as a purified section of Goala. For the Bagals to establish their claim as Goalas would be indirectly to link the Sadgop and Bagal castes to each other, a link which the Sadgops adamantly deny.

However, the Goalas also distinguish themselves from the Bagals, as noted in the West Bengal District Gazetteers: Puruliya (1985):

The Goalas are a sat-sudra caste; they are pastoralists and milkmen by traditional calling, ... Goalas trace their descent from the ancient Yadavas, often call themselves Gopas, and differentiate themselves, as occupying a higher rank, from the Bagals who also regard themselves as Gopas.

Although some Bagal people assert their descent from the prestigious Yadav group of castes, such as Ahir, Gop, Goala and Gopal (Gauda), seeking higher social status, but those groups don't accept their claim. Nevertheless, the Bagals residing in the undivided Midnapore region recount a migration narrative wherein their ancestors relocated from the former Bihar, with a smaller number originating from Mayurbhanj. In the 1931 census, 3 percent of Bagals in Mayurbhanj were identified as immigrants from Midnapore and Singhbhum. Scholars upon examining the Bagal caste's genealogy and ethnolinguistic affiliation, have posited that those individuals may have had an aboriginal origin, having settled in East Chota Nagpur by adopting cattle herding as means of livelihood.

According to Singh (2012), Bagal people are might be descendants of Gond/Gour ethnic group or/and cattle–herder of any tribe and caste, because of various socio-historical processes they segmented and formed real caste by adopting regional language and culture. Further the community is fragmented into territory based sub-divisional endogamous group on the basis of regional status and subsidiary activities they were involved. Subsequently, entered into the Hindu caste system with the trend of Hinduization, resulting social stratification. Nowadays Bagal settlement mostly found on both sides of the Subarnarekha River which is the borderline of Jharkhand, Odisha and West Bengal. And only the Bagals of Subarnarekha valley and recent migrants living in nearby districts are known as Bagals, well bounded in between Kangsabati and Baitarani River. However, some of them, along with other sources, also claim that some of their kinsmen migrated to North Bengal and Northeast India during the British Raj, specifically to work as tea garden labourers.

In the 19–20th century, the Bagals were primarily employed as Baromasia (annual domestic serfs), Bhatua (workers in exchange for food), Dhangar (animal caretakers), Kamins/Muliya (laborers), and Munis (helpers) in affluent agriculturist households, works collectively known as Bagal. In the course of Indian social development, they transitioned to different occupations from their traditional roles, primarily to agriculture and other unskilled manual work. For instance the occupational pattern (primary and subsidiary) of the total workforce of Bagal population in Mayurbhanj state was Agricultural labourer (335/120), Farmer (262/76), Tenant farmer (35/34), Grain parcher (14/3), Herdsmen (13/13), Village watchman (3/3), Bullock cart driver (2/6), Iron related worker (2/1) Non-cultivating proprietors of land (2/0) and Educator (0/1). Contrastingly, minors were primarily engaged in their traditional occupation of cattle herding. (Note: Laeequddin (1937), pp. 373–400, 404) In the late 20th century, they used to work as sabai-grass rope-makers. Furthermore, Chakraborty (2012) observed a similar occupational pattern among the Bagals of Midnapore.

=== Uprising ===
The Bagals have historically relied on the forest and agriculture for their livelihood, predating the colonial era. As a pastoral community, they depended on the forest for pasture. Their livelihood worsened when the Britishers imposed exploitative zamindari rules and high taxes on forest rights in the Jangal Mahal of Bengal Presidency. They began to oppose the rules as there is evidence that they were listed in various criminal records of the British India. Thereafter, they became a part of the Santhal rebellion, Chuar rebellion and other regional peasant movement to fight against the Britishers.

The Bagals of Medinapore were involved in large-scale plundering of food grain from wealthy household, a form of food riots caused by a man-made famine in 1943 that fuelled up the Bagals to participate in the Independence India movement.

== Culture ==
The Bagal community embraces a form of Folk Hinduism, yet they do not possess specific Hinduistic etiological myths (jati purana) within their cultural repertoire. Their socio-cultural practices primarily revolve around agricultural pursuits and the worship of their community deity. Over time, their attire has evolved significantly. Initially, men wore bhagoa, and women wore sarees above the knee without blouses and petticoats. Later, they improved to white dhoti and sarees with red or black stripes on both ends. Nowadays, men wear pant-shirts, and women wear saree-blouses, which constitute the general dressing style of India. Similarly, in cultural aspects, they progressively embraced aspects of Hindu culture. Birth, death, and marriage rituals are now being conducted with the assistance of priestly, barber, and washerman castes, as well as the son-in-law, to uphold the purity norms of Hindu society. During communal rituals, such as the Munda and Bhumij ceremonies, the Dehri or Deheri (village priest) and designated heads of households or society perform the rituals. The traditional customs of the Bagal people, involving activities like animal sacrificing, body tattooing (khoda), cauterization (dag), traditional group dances, and other primitive practices, are now on the verge of cultural extinction. Presently, Bagal traditions and rituals have largely been replaced by Hindu beliefs, and only the older generation residing in Bagal-majority villages retain their own distinct traditions and rituals.

=== Life cycle ===
Human life unfolds through various stages, which are subject to observation within diverse social frameworks. While the social customs of the Bagal society are based on Hinduism, their methods and purposes demonstrate a leaning towards Animism.

In the Bagal community, upon the birth of a baby, the news is promptly shared with relatives, followed by a celebration known as narta-ghar on the ninth day after birth. During this celebration, the formal naming of the baby takes place, which is called mita-deoa. After the mita-deoa ceremony, the baby is given a permanent name based on the forefather, kinsman, or the time, day, and month the child is born. In some cases, this naming ceremony is observed on the twenty-first day. During adolescence, boys and girls engage in activities such as tending to domestic animals and assisting with household chores. From this phase they generally employed as Bagal (cattle herder-cum-domestic servant) in agriculturist household. As they enter puberty, endeavor to acquire skills in agricultural practices and other sustainable work. In contrast, the first menstruation of girls does not receive significant observance, except among affluent families who may organize a fest. When boys and girls reach a suitable age for marriage, their families undertake the task of finding an appropriate spouse from within their endogamous subdivision, which can be accomplished through various methods including negotiation, courtship, mutual consent, intrusion, exchange, or coercion. The Bagal community recognizes four primary types of marriage: Dekha-chahan beha (arranged marriage), Palaniya/Sindur-ghasa beha (love marriage), Kuta-mala beha (low-cost/urgent marriage), and Sanga beha (widow remarriage). The first and some cases second type of general marriage involve the assistance of Brahmins, while the others are conducted through the community's own social institutions. Additional forms of martial relationship include Sali beha (junior sororate), Jethi-sauri beha (senior sororate), Rakhni beha (levirate), and Dajbar beha, are neither encouraged nor restricted. In their society marriage is commonly characterized by monogamy, though there is occasional observance of polygamy.

Throughout pregnancy, Bagal women adhere to a variety of traditions, rituals, and taboos. At the seventh month of pregnancy, family members joyfully offer an assortment of food and arrange a small feast called shad-khia, which involves the participation of neighbors.

They predominantly follows Hindu cremation rituals, except if in the case of deceased pregnant women or children, burial takes place by interring the body and planting a tree.

=== Festivals ===
In the Bagal community, festivals can be classified into two distinct types based on their social significance and the nature of celebration.

The first category comprises community level festivals, including Bangsa puja, Gotar puja, Ghar puja, Garam puja, Asali puja, Mag puja, Jantal puja, and Nua khai. These celebrations are observed within specific social units, such as lineages, sub-lineages, clans, or families, fostering a sense of unity and cohesion within these close-knit groups. The second category consists of festivals like Makar parab, Durga Puja, Bandna, Kali Puja, Tusu puja, Raja parab, and Gamha parab. Unlike the previous group, these festivals involve interactions with neighboring communities residing in the local area, contributing to a shared cultural experience among these adjoining social units.

For the youth of the Bagal community, Bandna Parab, a festival centered around cattle worship, and Karam Puja, a ritualistic veneration of the Karam tree (symbolizing the Karam God), hold particular significance as they represent an integral aspect of their cultural heritage. These festivals serve as an important link to their traditions and values.

=== Beliefs ===
The Bagal community embraces a diverse belief system, acknowledging a wide spectrum of benevolent and malevolent deities and spirits. They hold deep reverence for benevolent deities such as Shiva, Hari, Kali, Durga, Lakshmi, Garam-Dharam or Sarna, Burha-Budhi, Bagut/Bhahuti, Rohini, Karam, Pahar, Sannyash, Manasa, Sitala, Jitiya, and Bonkumari, among others, attributing to them blessings and positive influences. Conversely, they recognize the presence of malevolent spirits, including Dan-buri/Dahini-buri, Bisay-chandi, Sangee-hangkar, Kalia-kundra, Baria, Baram, Churkin, Go-muha, Sat-bahini, Joka, Jhapri, Dhan-kundra, Kapua, Bagut, and others, capable of causing harm and misfortune. To prevent it, they perform apotropaic rituals involving the sacrificial offerings of domestic animals like goat, sheep, pig, cock, pigeon, etc., with the assistance of Deheri and Ojha in their cultural customs.

=== Dance and music ===
Bagal people dance to a variety of songs during the festival to make life more enjoyable. Karam Nach, Pata Nach, Kathi Nach, Khemta Nach, Chhou Nach and Jhumar Nach are key activities. And sing various associated songs of those dance like Jhumar geet, Bandna geet, Makar geet, Karam geet, Ahira geet, Tusu geet. Nachni and Rasikia people dance and sing in culture activities. Often the music and folklore depicts their past and experiences of lives. For instance a folklore in Manbhum region is like;

" Gāi gelāk bijubanē
Bāchchur gelāk Rānebanē
Bāgāl gelak Arunbanē
Khūnji Khūnji–Jhāmralai Mai
Tāo Bāgāl ghūrē nāi āishe. "

Translation: The cows had gone to Bijuban, Calf had gone to Raneban, the Bagal (herder boy) had gone to Arunban. I became really tried by searching and searching, but not yet returned the herder boy. (Note: The Bijuban, Raneban, Arunban and Baghban are folk names of ecocultural forest zone, i.e. the Bijuban compose West Singhbhum, East Singhbhum, Saraikela Kharsawan, Ranchi (Panch pargania region), Dhanbad, Giridih, Hazaribagh district of Jharkhand and Purulia district of West Bengal; the Raneban compose Godda and Sahebganj district of Jharkhand; the Arunban compose Bankura (Bhilaidihi, Phulkusma, Raipur, Supur, Ambikanagar, Simlapal, Kuilapal, Jhantibani, Shilda) and ten southwestern parganas of the undivided Paschim Medinipur of West Bengal; and the Baghban compose the Mayurbhanj, Keonjhar and Sundargarh district of Odisha.)
They also sing jhumar song like;

" Hāt gele hāte nāi
Bāt gele bāte nāi
Balē debē hē hāmār saiyãkē
Dhūdhi latē bāndhiab uyàke. "

Translation: In the market, he isn't there, in the village road he isn't seen. Ohh my friends please tell my boyfriend, I shall tie him with Dudhi-lot (symbolising the tie of love).

During Karam puja, they sing Karam song like;

" Karam Kātoray Dādā,
Ako Chotāy Ghar Ghuri Jāo,
Karam Rājākay Dhutia Parābo,
Indo Rānikay Sāriā Parābo.
Hāti Chari Aairay Karam Rājā,
Ghorā Chari Aairay Indo Rāni. "

Translation: "Oh ! elder brother, please cut a Karam branch, Cut it by just a stroke of battle-axe and return home with it, We shall dress King Karam with dhuti and Queen Indo with saree, Oh ! King Karam, come to our home riding an elephant, Oh ! Queen Indo, come to our home riding a horse."

== Politics ==
In ethnic prospective Bagal is numerically smaller community living three political zone (i.e. Jharkhand, Odisha and West Bengal) of India. In which various social factor are distinct from each other, specially medium of language both educational and primary spoken language, center of job opportunities and culture of state. So they are assimilating themselves with the local Hindu social order of those states and nowadays as a whole do not hold distinct and standalone prehistorical identity, which is a process of social mobility in India. In the form of sanskritisation, seeking higher social status. For instance, as observed by Singh (2008), the Bagals of Jharkhand were associated with the All India Yadav Mahasabha by equating themselves with the Gops during the sanskritisation movement in India. They have greater tribal attributes in them but there is no historical records to support as they are tribal or untouchable community except the Bagals of Mayurbhanj state, where Bagals were noted as tribal in 1931 census with the fact that their drinking habits of homemade rice beer (hanria) and socio-cultural alignment with the Munda-origin Bhumij tribe. In this context, they are often referred as mahara (means "orphan") by the Santhals, who have retained their strong socio-cultural identity. However, according to the government institutions, the Bagal community does not fulfill the predefined criteria (that are distinctive culture, indications of primitive traits, geographical isolation, backwardness, shyness of contact with the community at large and victims of untouchability) to enlisting a community in Scheduled Castes and Scheduled Tribes list for affirmative action except some level of untouchability and the backwardness. Therefore, they are not scheduled either as a caste or as a tribe to claim any constitutional benefits. Although the Bagals of Bihar (include Jharkhand) and West Bengal were classified as Other Backward Class and the Bagals of West Bengal marked as 'Most Backward' by Kalelkar Commission, the first Socially and Educationally Backward Classes Commission of India. During this committee, the Registrar General of India (1954) provisionally classified Bagals of West Bengal as a Backward Class for social justice. Then only the Bagals of West Bengal classified as Other Backward Class and sub-classified as 'Depressed Backward Class' by Mandal Commission, the second Socially and Educationally Backward Classes Commission of India. On the other hand, the Bagals of Odisha have been left out of these committee reports, instead proposed for inclusion in the Scheduled Tribes list. Moreover, as a status quo, the Bagal caste is not included in any notified category in any of these states as a distinct social group; rather, they are considered part of the generic population. In light of this, some Bagal people are asserting themselves as belonging to other notified communities to avail government-sponsored welfare benefits and constitutional privileges of affirmative action. (Note: "It is found that most of the Bagals do not hesitate to introduce themselves by the name of 'Bagal'. A few of them asserted themselves as 'Baiga' – a scheduled tribe in Madhya Pradesh, just to have constitutional facilities." Quoted "In West Bengal, there is a group of people who are popularly known as Bagal, which means 'cattle herding'. ...this group have greater tribal attributes in them. But they do not belong to Scheduled Caste or tribe. As a result, they are trying to rename themselves as 'Baiga', because the Baigas are Scheduled tribe and are getting all Constitutional benefits." Quoted)

During the Colonial rule in India, available records indicate that the Bagals had a literacy rate of 2.15 percent (180 people) in the Chota Nagpur Division, 2 percent (26 people) in the Saraikela-Kharsawan and Mayurbhanj Feudatory States of Bengal in 1891, and only 1.1 percent (18 people) in Mayurbhanj of Orissa Tributary States in 1931. These figures contributed to their classification as educationally backward of Bengal in 1923. In response, measures were taken to make them eligible for scholarships and stipends for their educational upliftment in 1939. However, the impact of these initiatives on their educational outcomes was found to be unfavorable. Singh (2012) also emphasized the issue of illiteracy among the Bagals. Chakraborty (2012) reported the literacy rate for the 984 sampled individuals of Midnapore was 24.79 percent, with 21.23 percent of males and 3.56 percent of females being literate. The observed low literacy rate among the Bagals primarily attributed to factors such as their occupation patterns and challenging socio-economic conditions. These historical trends highlight the socio-economic and educational disadvantages that have persisted within the Bagal community over time. Through some improvements in their social status have been observed since India's Independence by the constitutional provisions, but not reached an equivalent level compared to neighboring societies.

From above the fact, they oscillate between the caste pole and tribe pole within the government-defined parameters, lacking legal identity. However, for their socio-cultural, economic, and political security, they have been voicing their concerns from the independence of India to both state and central governments, seeking constitutional recognition and inclusion in the list of Scheduled Castes or Tribes. Some of the major socio-political events are noted below;

In between 1970 and 1975, there were a number of retribalisation movements by the Bagal people for inclusion in the Scheduled list. In 1976 Narendranath Raut along with other Bagals of Nayagram tempted to lunch a movement to get into the Scheduled tribe list. Subsequently, In 1978 they demonstrated in large near West Bengal Assembly house. In response, on February 20, 1980, the Ministry of Home Affairs assured their proposal for included in the list of Schedule categories. On April 21, 1981, Seventh Lok Sabha – 5th session; Shri Matilal Hansda, Jhargram CPI (M) MP raised concern about Bagal community, who are educationally, economically and culturally backward in ground and can be comparable with other Schedule Caste and Tribes. Thus, he urged the government to take necessary uplifting measures for them. On May 15, 1985, Eighth Lok Sabha – 2nd session; Shri Chintamani Jena, Balesore INC MP requested Shrimati Ram Dilari Sinha, The Ministry of Home Affairs for the inclusion of Bagal caste in the Scheduled Tribe list. Shrimati Sinha assured that the proposal is considered and will be included after a comprehensive revision. On April 25, 1990, the Tribal Research Institute of the Odisha government recommended the inclusion of the Bagal caste in the state Scheduled Tribes list. During the 2009 Lalgarh insurgency, a conflict between Maoists and the Indian armed forces, the Jharkhand Andolan Samannay Mancha (JASM) demanded the inclusion of Bagal community in the list of Scheduled Tribes as a potential solution. On April 26, 2010, Lok Sabha debate; Dr. Pulin Bihari Baske, Jhargram CPI (M) MP demanded inclusion of Bagal community in tribal (ST) list. On August 18, 2011, during the 15th West Bengal Assembly, Rameshwar Dolai, Keshpur CPI(M) MLA, questioned the State Backward Classes Welfare Department regarding the inclusion of the Bagal community in the Scheduled Castes list, to which the Department stated that there's no proposal for inclusion. On September 27, 2018, Bagals of Morada, Mayurbhanj demonstrated in the district headquarter, Baripada with the support of Jharkhand Mukti Morcha (JMM) and sent a memorandum to the President of India for inclusion of Bagal caste in the Schedule Tribe list. On July 12, 2019, Bisheshwar Tudu, Mayurbhanj BJP MP requested Shri Arjun Munda, The Ministry of Tribal Affairs for inclusion of Bagal caste in the Scheduled Tribe list.
