= Western Bengali dialects =

Group of dialects of Bengali

Western Bengali
- Mānbhūmī Bengali; Jharkhandi Bengali
- মানভূমী বাংলা রাঢ়ী বুলি
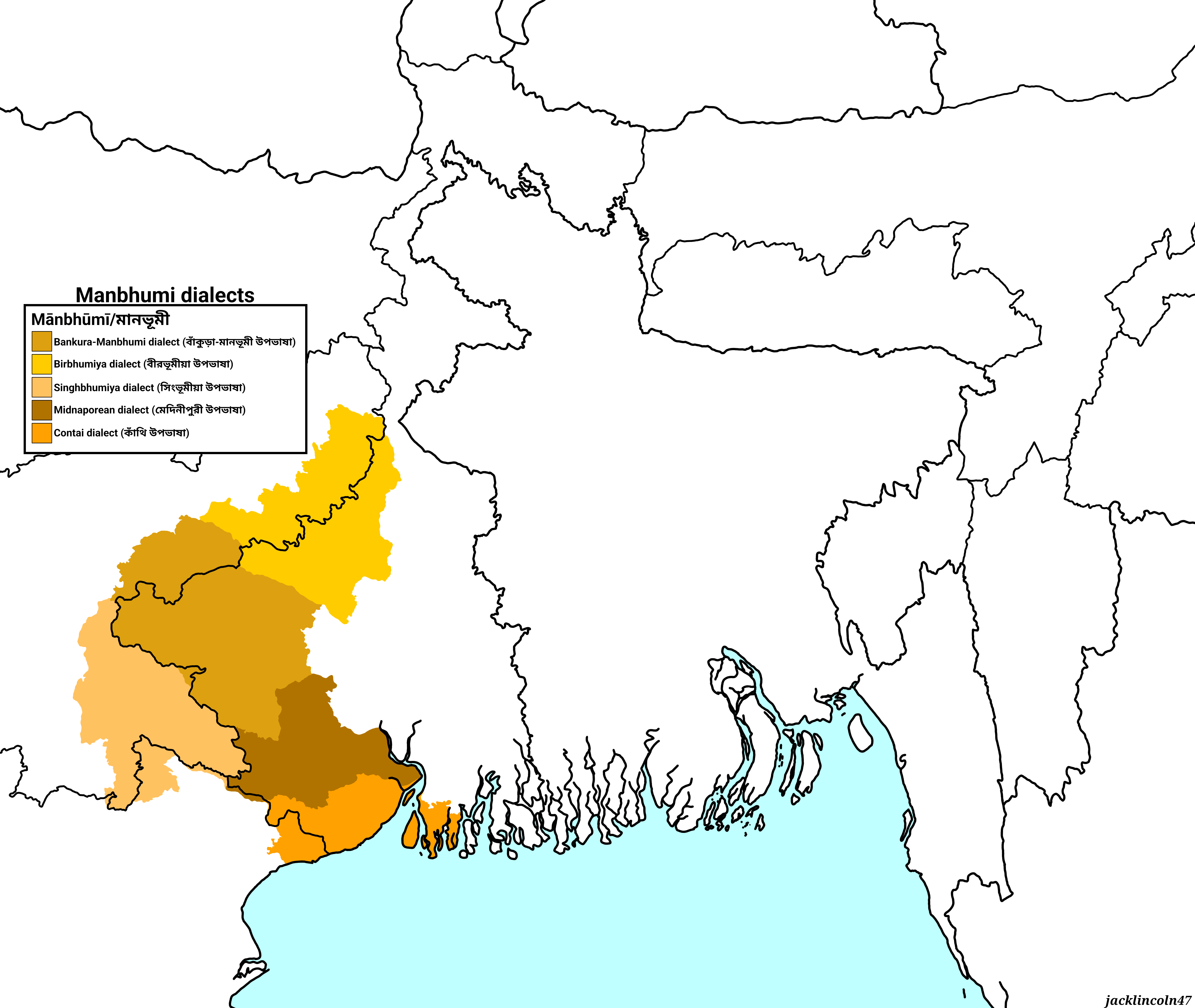
- Native to: India
- Region: West Bengal (Medinipur division, parts of Burdwan division and Presidency division); Jharkhand (Kolhan division, Santhal Pargana division, parts of North Chotanagpur division and Ranchi district); Odisha (parts of Mayurbhanj District and Balasore District)
- Language family: Indo-European: Indo Iranian; Indo Aryan; Eastern Zone; Bengali–Assamese; Bengali; Western Bengali
- Early forms: Gaudi Prakrit: Old Bengali; Middle Bengali
- Writing system: Bengali alphabet

Language codes
- ISO 639-3: –
- Glottolog: manb1234 Manbhumi

Western Bengali, also known as Mānbhūmī Bengali (Bengali: মানভূমী বাংলা, romanized: Mānbhūmī Bāṅlā pronounced [manbʱumi baŋla]) or Rāḍhi Bengali is a set of western vernacular Bengali dialects spoken in the Western Rarh region. These include Greater Manbhum, West Bardhaman, Bankura (excluding Bishnupur), Greater Medinipur, Birbhum, Singhbhum, Santal Parganas, Chotanagpur, Kakdwip in South 24 Parganas and other adjacent areas of West Bengal, Jharkhand and Odisha. It is one of the Bengali dialects, having some influences of neighbouring dialects of Hindi and Odia in the bordering areas.

Manbhumi Bengali has a rich tradition of folk songs sung in various occasions. Tusu songs are sung by village girls during a month-long observance of Tusu festival in villages of Purulia and some parts of Barddhaman, Bankura and Birbhum districts of West Bengal and parts of East Singhbhum, Saraikela Kharsawan, Bokaro, Dhanbad and Ranchi districts of Jharkhand. Bhadu songs, Karam songs, Baul songs and Jhumar songs are also composed in Manbhumi Bengali. Manbhumi Bengali songs are used by Chhau performers of Purulia School to depict various mythological events. Chhau is one of the distinguished dance forms of this geographical region which has been accorded the status of Intangible cultural heritage by UNESCO in 2009.

== Phonology ==
=== Vowels ===
	Front	Central	Back
Close	i		u
Open-mid	ɛ		ɔ
Open		a	

=== Consonants ===
		Labial	Dental	Alveolar	Palato-alveolar	Retroflex	Velar	Glottal
Nasal		m		n			ŋ	
Plosive	voiceless		t̪			ʈ	k	
Plosive	voiced		d̪			ɖ	ɡ	
Affricate	voiceless				t͡ʃ			
Affricate	voiced				d͡ʒ			
Fricative	voiceless	ɸ		s				h
Fricative	voiced	β						
Approximant				l				
Rhotic				ɾ				

== Regional variation ==
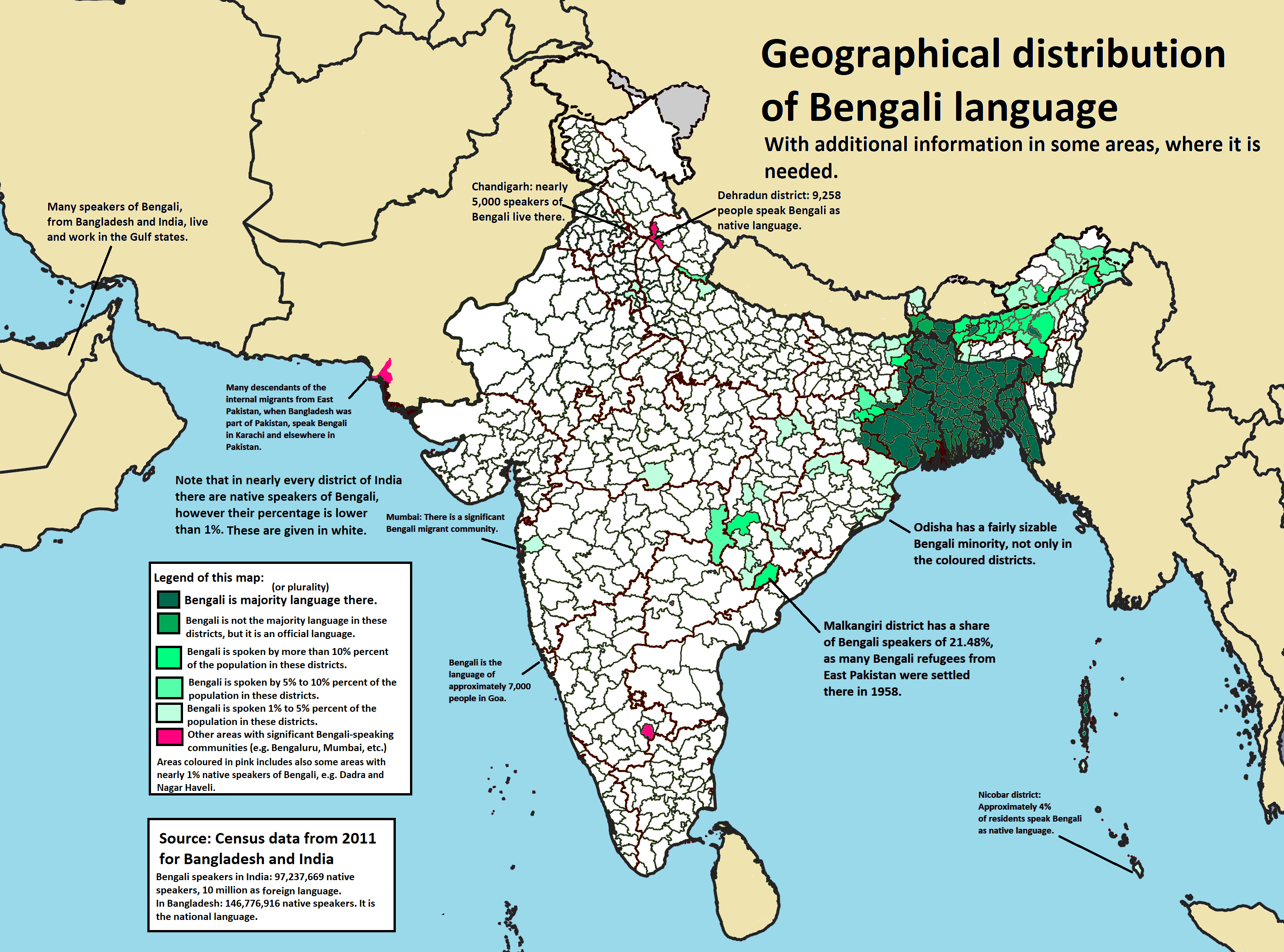
Bengali speaking region.

This Bengali dialect is spoken in the Manbhum and Dhalbhum area and has its extended regional variants or subdialects throughout southern border area of Medinipur division of West Bengal, south eastern border of Kolhan division of Jharkhand.

== Examples of sentences in the Western Bengali Dialects ==
=== "A man had two sons" ===
Manbhum: æk loker duţa beţa chhilô. (M)

Pashchim Bardhaman district, Purba Bardhaman district): æktā loker duiţā chhilā chhilo. (M)

Dhalbhum/East Singhbhum: ek loker duţa chha chhilo. (M)

Baharagora/Gopiballavpur: gotae noker duţa po thailaa. (M)

East Medinipur: gote loker duiţa toka thila. (M)

=== "Where are you all going?" ===
Manbhum: tumhra kuthay jaichho? (M)

Pashchim Bardhaman district, Purba Bardhaman district: tumra kuthay jēchchho?/jāchchho (Varies by location) (M)

Dhalbhum/East Singhbhum: tumhra kaai jaichho? (M)

Baharagora/Gopiballavpur: tumara kaai jaoţo ? (M)

East Medinipur: tumra kaai jaoţo? (M)

=== "The Child is reading/studying well" ===
Manbhum: Chhana ţa bhalo padhchhe (M)

Pashchim Bardhaman district: Chhila ţô bhalo pōdhchhe (M)

Dhalbhum/East Singhbhum: Chha ţa bhalo padhchhe? (M)

Baharagora/Gopiballavpur: Chha ţa bhala padheţe. (M)

East Medinipur: Pila ţa bhala padhţe. (M)

There are two tribal languages, Kharia Thar and Mal Paharia, mainly spoken in Manbhum region of Bengal and Jharkhand by some small tribes, are closely related to Western Bengali dialects, but are typically classified as separate languages.

== See also ==
- Bengali Language Movement (Manbhum)
