= Dhalbhum =

Princely estate in British India

Coordinates: 22°56′46″N 86°45′24″E

- Zamindari Estate of British India
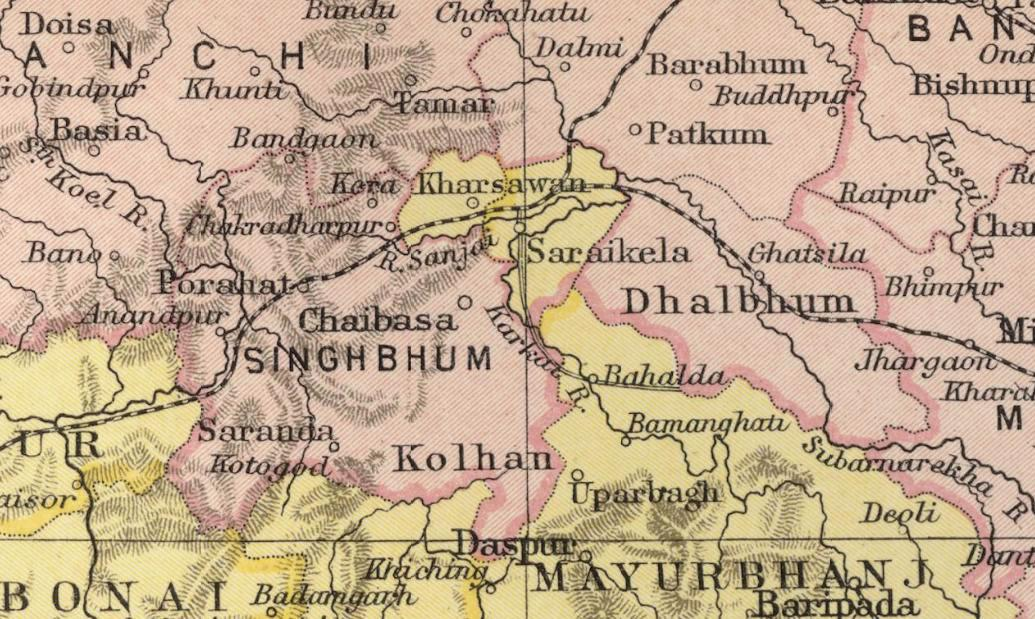
- Dhalbhum as part of extended Singhbhum district in 1909 map of The Imperial Gazetteer of India
- Area
  - 1872: 3,111 km^{2} (1,201 sq mi)
  - 1891: 2,970 km^{2} (1,150 sq mi)
  - 1941: 3,004 km^{2} (1,160 sq mi)
- Population
  - 1872: 117,118
  - 1891: 194,469
  - 1941: 533,402
- Government
  - Type: Royal rules
- History
  - Established: 15th century
  - Beginning of Revenue Settlement negotiation with British: 1767
  - Revenue Settlement with British: 1777
  - Merged with Manbhum: 1833
  - Merged with Singhbhum: 1846
  - Khatra, Raipur and Simlapal area curved out and merged with Bankura: 1879
Succeeded by
Republic of India
- Today part of: East Singhbhum district of Jharkhand

Dhalbhum was an estate in early modern period and British India, spread across the East Singhbhum district in present-day Jharkhand, western part of Bankura, and Midnapore district of West Bengal.

== History ==
=== Prehistory ===
==== Dhalbhum Raj ====
the Dhal clan, the history of Dhalbhumgarh dates back approximately 700 years, to the reign of King Anangabhima Deva III of Odisha. During this period, four brothers are believed to have arrived in Odisha from Rewa, in the Bundelkhand region of central India. They were traditionally regarded as descendants of the Kalachuri rulers of Dahala. At that time, the Dhalbhum region was governed by a local ruler named King Chintamani Dhoba. With the support and assistance of King Anangabhima Deva III, the four brothers launched a campaign against Chintamani Dhoba and conquered the territory. Following their victory, they established their rule over the region and named their newly acquired territory Dhalbhumgarh. A branch of the same family is also believed to have established its rule over Chikligarh and Jamboni.

Rankini Devi is established as the family goddess of the Dhalbhum rulers. It is said that human sacrifice was offered to the goddess every year.

=== Colonial period ===
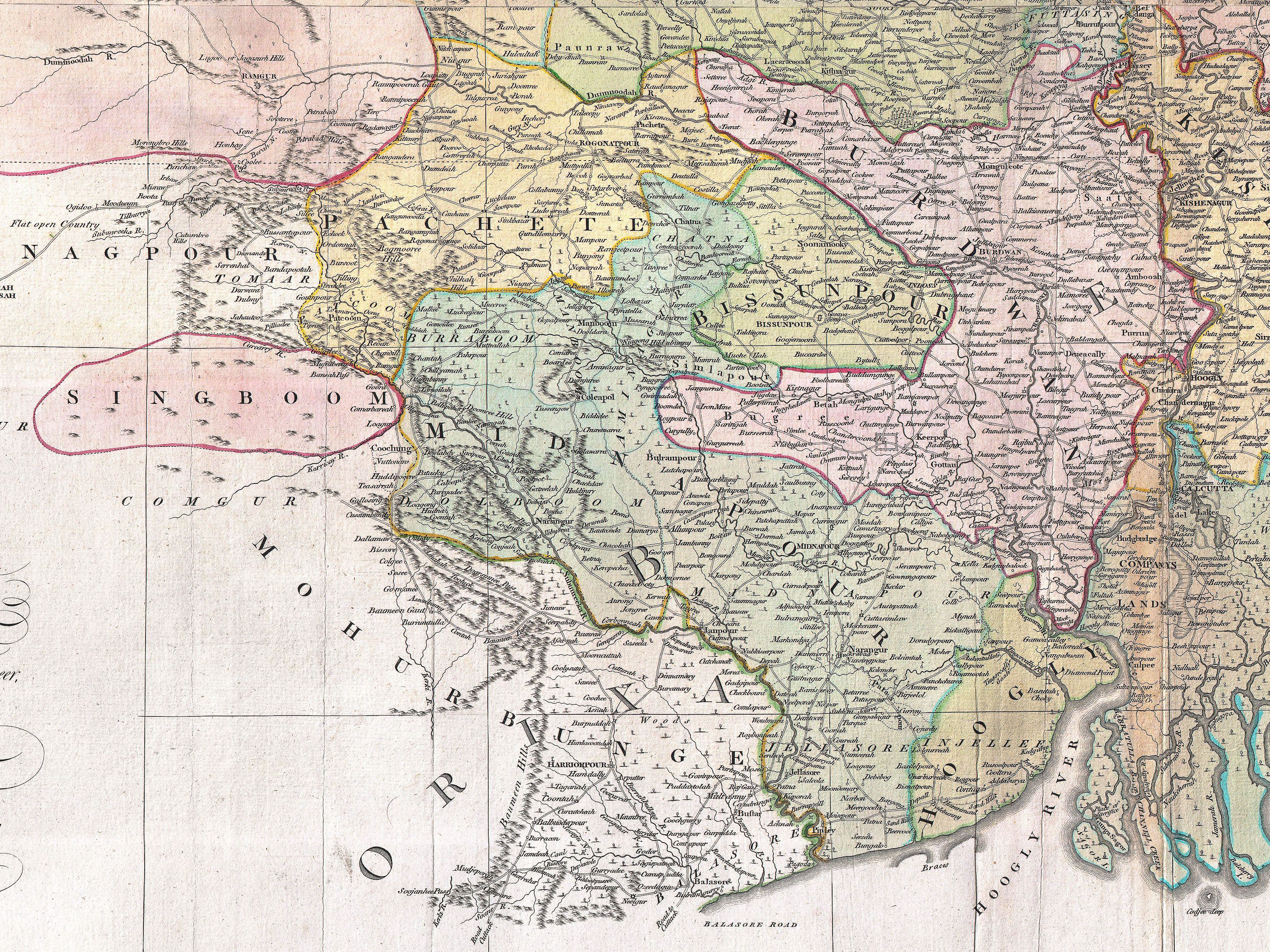
Dhalbhum under jurisdiction of Medinipur, 1776

Dhalbhum was part of the Midnapore region of Bengal until 1760 when the East India Company (EIC) acquired Midnapore and Burdwan. Following the cession, the EIC continued revenue surveys and settlements, expanding westward into tribal-concentrated areas where many local chiefs were either of tribal origin or had tribal support. This led to a series of civil and military conflicts, collectively known as the Chuar Rebellion (c. 1760–1833), aimed at resisting British authority. The Tamar Revolt (c. 1783–1793), Kol Uprising (c. 1831–1832), and Bhumij Rebellion or Ganga Narayan Hangama (c. 1832–1833) were part of this larger resistance. To control the unrest, the British created the Jungle Mahal administrative unit in 1805, which was bifurcated into smaller districts in 1833, with Dhalbhum becoming part of Manbhum district. It was merged into Singhbhum district in 1846, while the Porihati area comprising 14.5 square miles (38 km^{2}) transferred to Jhargram of Midnapore district in 1847 and Khatra, Raipur, and Simlapal areas were transferred to Bankura district in 1879. By 1872, Dhalbhum had a population of 117,118 across 1,201 square miles. It became part of the Bihar and Orissa Province in 1912 and remained in Bihar Province after 1932. Following India's independence in 1947, Dhalbhum was reorganized as East Singhbhum district in 1990 after being carved out from the extended Singhbhum district.

== Demographics ==
Religion in Dhalbhum (1891)
Religion	Percent
Hinduism	65.34%
Animism	34.06%
Islam	0.55%
Christianity	0.05%

According to the Census of 1891, Dhalbhum covered an area of 1,147 square miles (2,970 km^{2}) and was inhabited by 194,469 people. Hindus formed 65.34 of the population, while 34.06 followed animistic beliefs; Muslims accounted for 0.55 and Christians for 0.05.

Ethnically, Santals constituted the largest group (29.52), followed by Bhumij (21.74), Tatwa or Tanti (4.62), Kurmi (3.73), Goala (3.31), Munda (3.11), Bagal (2.99), Lohar and Kamar (2.37), Manjhi (2.19), Bhuiya (1.90), Kharia (1.79), Kumhar (1.77), Teli and Kalu (1.37), Brahman (1.32), and Baishnab (1.16). The remaining population comprised smaller communities such as Mahili, Mal, Hajjam or Napit, Dhobi, Dom, Hari and Mihtar, Kalwar and Sunri, Kayastha and Karan, Kharwar, Ghasi, Ho, Gond, Baniya, Rajput, Shaikh, Oraon, Chamar and Muchi, Bagdi, Kewat, and Pan.
