= Jhumar song =

Folk music of East India

Jhumar, also known as Jhumur or Jhumair, is a form of folk music prevalent in the Chota Nagpur Plateau, primarily in Jharkhand, the southwestern region of West Bengal and the northern part of Odisha. It is also found in the Tea states of Assam due to emigration. Jhumar songs are sung during various social events, primarily during festivals such as Karam, Tusu, and Bandna by agricultural and indigenous communities like Kuṛmi, Oraon, Chik Baraik, Bagal, Bhumij, Rajwar, and Munda.

== Overview ==
The word "Jhumar" is derived from Jhum (Shifting cultivation), a regional term for the primitive method of farming practiced by indigenous-agricultural communities in eastern India and Bangladesh. In earlier times, it originated as a form of shouting (locally known as Hawka or Hanka) by working women, expressed through short lines describing their emotions while working in the fields. Under the influence of Hinduism, these songs became infused with religious themes, often featuring deities such as Radha–Krishna and Rama–Lakshmana.

Jhumar songs vary depending on the singer's region, as the Jhumar culture spans a vast area of eastern India. Due to this diversity, dominant regional languages intermingle with the songs, resulting in different dialectical variations. However, Jhumar songs are primarily composed in Nagpuri, Kurmali, and Bengali language. Since non-Aryan tribal groups also observe Jhumar-associated festivals, they often sing in a synthesized form that blends their native languages with Nagpuri, Kurmali, or Bengali. In general, Jhumar songs are classified into two broad groups: Traditional Jhumar and Modified Jhumar. Some examples of Traditional Jhumar include Adivasi Jhumur, Kathi Jhumur, and Nachni Jhumur, while Darbari, Pala, and Dand are examples of Modified Jhumar.

Adibasi, Bagalia, Baha, Bhaduria, Burihi, Chaitali, Dand, Darbari, Darsalia, Galoari, Jharkhandia, Jheta, Jhika, Jhikadang, Karam, Khatinach, Kurmali, Lagrey, Magha, Matoari, NachniNach, Pala, Pata, Raila, Riuja, Sadhu, Saharja, Tand, Thant and many more are the various disciplined forms of Jhumar songs. These songs are themed around Laukik Prem (worldly love), Pouranik (mythological tales), Prahelika (riddles), Radha–Krishna and Samajik (social themes).

== Notable singer ==
- Dulal Manki, Jhumair singer from Assam
- Mahavir Nayak, Theth Nagpuri singer
