= Bengali dialects =

Dialects of the Bengali language

The Bengali dialects (Bengali: বাংলা উপভাষা [baŋla upobʱaʃa]) or Bengali varieties (বাংলা ভাষিকা [baŋla bʱaʃika]) are the varieties of the Bengali language, an Eastern Indo-Aryan language of the Indo-European language family, widely spoken in the Bengal region of South Asia. The spoken dialects of Bengali are mutually intelligible with neighbouring dialects.

Bengali dialects can be classified along at least two dimensions: spoken vs. literary variations, and prestige vs. regional variations.

== Classifications ==
Suniti Kumar Chatterji and Sukumar Sen classified Bengali dialects into six classes by their phonology, morphology and pronunciation. They are:

1. Eastern Bengali/Bangali/Vanga dialects: the most widely spoken dialect of the Bengali language. It is spoken across the Khulna, Barisal, Dhaka, Mymensingh, Sylhet and Chittagong Divisions of Bangladesh, Tripura and parts of West Bengal in India. However, it's not a widely accepted grouping, as dialects spoken in Greater Khulna and Greater Jessore are much closer to Central dialects. Dialects spoken in central, central-north and southern Bangladesh are very different from Sylheti, Chittagonian and Noakhali dialects. Following the Partition of Bengal, some Bengali Hindu migrants from what's now Bangladesh continued to speak dialects from this grouping in West Bengal, with their use gradually declining by the 1990s.
2. Central Bengali/Rarhi dialects: spoken across much of southern West Bengal, India and southwestern Bangladesh. It is spoken by almost 20 percent of Bengali people. The regions where it is spoken include the whole of Presidency division, the northern half of Khulna Division, the southern half of Burdwan division and parts of the district of Murshidabad.
3. Southern Bengali/Sundarbani dialects: spoken in the Presidency Division and the Khulna Division of West Bengal and Bangladesh. It shares similar features with both the Bangali and Rarhi dialects.
4. North Central Bengali/Varendri dialects: spoken in Rajshahi Division, western and southern Rangpur Division of Bangladesh and Malda division of West Bengal, India (previously part of Varendra or Barind division). It is also spoken in some adjoining villages in Bihar and Jharkhand bordering Malda.
5. Western Bengali/Manbhumi/Jharkhandi dialects: spoken in the westernmost Bengali-speaking regions, which include the whole of Medinipur division and the northern half of Burdwan division in West Bengal. The dialect is also spoken in parts of Santhal Pargana division, Kolhan division and parts of North Chotanagpur division and Ranchi district of Jharkhand. It is also spoken in some adjoining villages in Odisha bordering Medinipur.
6. Far Northern Bengali/Rangpuri/Kamtapuri/Rajbanshi dialects: spoken in eastern Rangpur Division of Bangladesh and Jalpaiguri division and parts of Malda division of West Bengal, India and nearby areas in Goalpara of Assam, Kishanganj of Bihar and the Nepali province of Koshi.

Suniti Kumar Chatterji, describing the cluster as "Vaṅga Dialects", further divided it into two groups of two: "Western and Southwestern Vaṅga" and "Eastern and Southeastern Vaṅga". Eastern Vaṅga is spoken across the modern Bangladeshi division of Sylhet and the Greater Comilla region of Chittagong, along with the Barak Valley Division of Assam and the state of Tripura in India. Southeastern Vaṅga is spoken in the remaining area of the Chittagong division, corresponding to the former colonial territories of Noakhali District and Chittagong District, and historically extended further into Sittwe. Southwestern Vaṅga is spoken across the Khulna Division and South Faridpur, where Eastern Bengali transitions into Central Standard Bengali. Suniti Kumar Chatterji, in his classification of Bengali dialects, treated the "Rāḍha" cluster as three subgroups, such as: "Western Rāḍha", "Southwestern Rāḍha" and "Eastern Rāḍha". Western Rāḍha is spoken in Northern Greater Medinipur, West Bardhaman, Kolhan division, Chotanagpur, Santhal Pargana division, Birbhum, Purulia and Bankura. Southwestern Rāḍha is spoken in southern Greater Medinipur, Kakdwip subdivision of South 24 Parganas and parts of Odisha and Jharkhand. Eastern Rāḍha is spoken in Presidency division, Greater Kushtia, parts of Murshidabad and East Bardhaman district. He also kept "Varendra" and "Kāmarūpa" as separate regional groupings, with Varendra broadly corresponding to north central Bengal (Rajshahi Division, Malda division and parts of Rangpur Division) and Kāmarūpa (Rangpur division, parts of Malda division, Jalpaiguri division, parts of Purnia division and lower Assam division) to far northern Bengal and far western Assam. Western Vaṅga is spoken across the Bangladeshi divisions of Mymensingh, Dhaka, and Barisal.

Sukumar Sen later presented Bengali in a five-part regional scheme, commonly summarized as Rāṛhī, Jhaṛkhaṇḍī, Varendrī, Baṅgālī and Kāmrūpī. In this arrangement, Rāṛhī covers the western and south-central Bengali belt, Jhaṛkhaṇḍī the western and south-western region, Varendrī the north-central region, Baṅgālī the eastern and south-eastern Bengali belt, and Kāmrūpī the far northern and north-eastern stretch, including speech areas along the Rangpur-Assam border zone. Some modern summaries expand or subdivide these labels slightly, which is why Sen is sometimes described as using five classes and sometimes as a six-fold classification in later discussions. In later summaries of Bengali dialect classification, Suniti Kumar Chatterji and Sukumar Sen are both credited with a six-fold division that includes Sundarbani alongside Rarhi, Jharkhandi/Manbhumi, Vanga, Varendri and Rangpuri. Sundarbani, also called Southern Bengali, is spoken in the Sundarbans region of southern Bengal, particularly in Satkhira, parts of Khulna and South 24 Parganas, and is commonly described as a transitional variety showing features of both Eastern and Central Bengali.

George A. Grierson, in the Linguistic Survey tradition, treated Bengali speech as a cluster of seven regional dialect groupings, namely Central Bengali, Northern Bengali, Eastern Bengali, Rajbanshi Bengali, Western Bengali, South-western Bengali and South-eastern Bengali. He also mentioned in his work that the dialect spoken in undivided Jessore, Khulna and parts of Faridpur can be treated as a distinct sub-dialect named East-Central Bengali as it is described as a connecting dialect between Central Bengali and the extreme Eastern Bengali varieties of Dhaka and Bakerganj. Later summaries of his work also note that he recognized especially distinctive forms in the extreme eastern regions of Vanga, including the speech of eastern Sylhet, Cachar, Chakma, Noakhali and Chittagong, which he treated as a separate eastern transition zone within the wider Bengali continuum.

Prabhat Ranjan Sarkar, in the discourse collection Varna Vijinana, is presented as dividing Bengali into twelve regional dialects: Central Rarh, Contai, Kolkata, Nadia/Shantipuriya, Shershahbadia, Maldaiya, Jaungipuri, Barendri, Rangpuri, Sylhet, Dacca/Vikrampuri, Jessore, Barisal/Candradviipii and Chittagong Bengali.

Dr. Muhammad Shahidullah divided all Bengali dialects into two groups: Prācya (Bengali: প্রাচ্য, romanized: prachyô, lit. 'eastern') and Pāścātya (Bengali: পাশ্চাত্য, romanized: pashchatyô, lit. 'western'). Within his Prācya grouping, he created the divisions of "Dakṣiṇa-Pūrva" or "Southeastern" and "Pūrva-Prāntika" or "Extreme Eastern", which approximately correspond to Chatterji's "Western and Southwestern Vaṅga" and "Eastern and Southeastern Vaṅga", respectively. The Southeastern group is spoken across the modern Bangladeshi divisions of Mymensingh, Dhaka, Barisal, and Khulna, as well as the Greater Noakhali region of the Chittagong division and eastern parts of the 24 Parganas district in West Bengal. The Extreme Eastern group is spoken across the Bangladeshi divisions Sylhet and Chittagong, including Greater Comilla and excluding Greater Noakhali, as well as the Barak Valley division of Assam. In his Pāścātya classification, Shahidullah identified a northern subdivision known as "Udīcya" or "Northern". This area approximately aligns with what is termed North Central Bengali, while also including the Far Northern Bengali dialects spoken in Rangpur. The subdivision corresponds to Chatterji's combined Varendra and Kāmarūpa groups. Shahidullah notes that this northern zone stretches from Goalpara to Purnia, encompassing large parts of the historical Kamarupa and Varendra regions. The rest of the Pāścātya group represents "Dakṣiṇa-Paścima" or "Southwestern" dialects. The southwestern group is spoken across Greater Medinipur, parts of Jharkhand, Bankura, Purulia, parts of Odisha, Bardhaman and the Presidency division, including Greater Kushtia.

Gopal Haldar, in his study of Eastern Bengali, divided all East Bengali dialects into four groups. Group I or "Central East Bengali" spans the modern Bangladeshi divisions of Mymensingh, Dhaka, Faridpur, and Barisal, as well as the district of Chandpur in Chittagong Division. The de facto Standard East Bengali spoken around the Bikrampur region is a member of this group, comparable to Chatterji's "Typical East Bengali". Group II or "Central North East Bengali" is spoken in eastern areas of the Mymensingh and Dhaka divisions, the western half of the Sylhet Division, and the Brahmanbaria District of the Chittagong Division. Group III or "North East Bengali" is spoken in the eastern half of the Sylhet Division as well as the bordering Barak Valley division of Assam, India. Group IV or "South East Bengali" is spoken in the Chittagong Division, notably excluding the Greater Comilla region. The Comilla District and Tripura state of India, the Bengalis in the latter chiefly being migrants from the former, sit at the confluence of all the major groupings, and thus the speech of this region shares features with all the major groups classified by Haldar. Transitionary East Bengali is spoken in the Khulna division as well as Western Greater Faridpur, i.e., Rajbari District, which shares features with both Standard Bengali and Eastern Bengali dialects.

Dialect map according to Chatterji.

Dialect map according to Chatterji & Sen.

Dialect map according to Grierson.

Dialect map according to Sarkar.

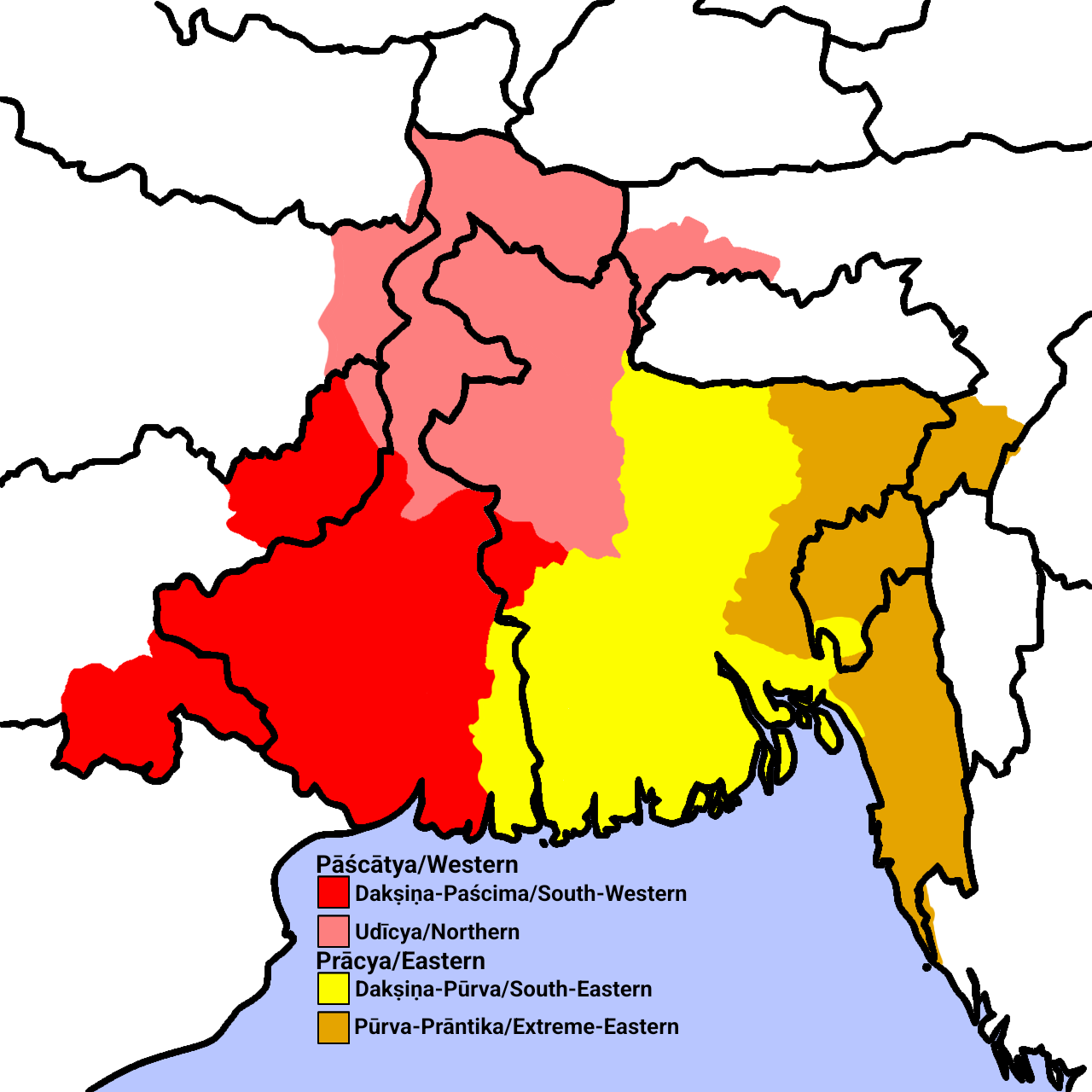
Dialect map according to Shahidullah.

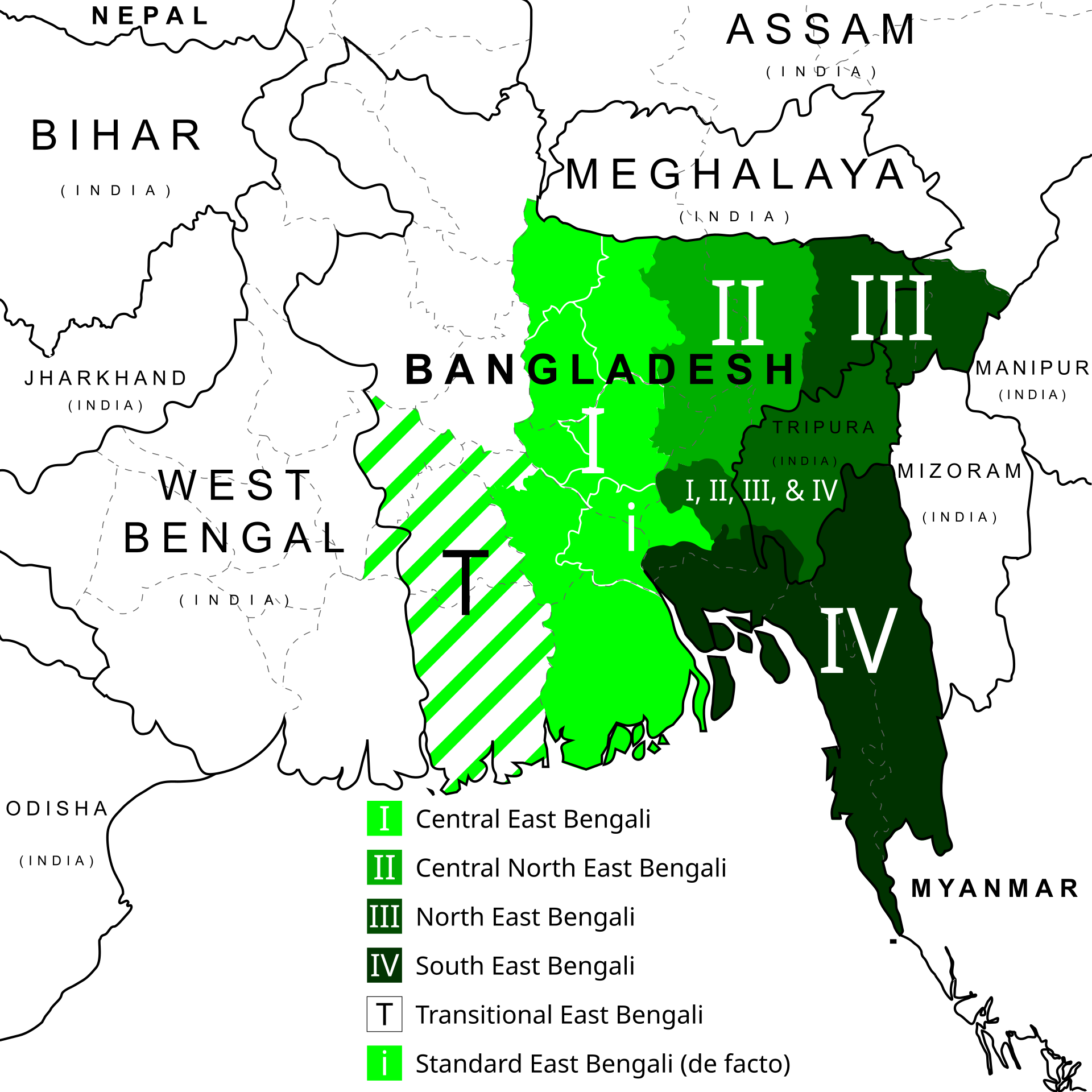
Dialect map according to Haldar. (Eastern Bengali)

== Standard registers ==
Bengali has two standard registers. More than other Indo-Aryan languages, Bengali exhibits strong diglossia between the formal, written language and the vernacular, spoken language. Two styles of writing, involving somewhat different vocabularies and syntax, have emerged:

1. Sādhubhāṣā (সাধুভাষা) is the literary register with longer verb inflections and a more Sanskrit-derived (তৎসম tôtshôm) vocabulary (সাধু shādhu = 'chaste' or 'sage'; ভাষা bhāṣā = 'language'). Songs such as India's national anthem Jana Gana Mana (by Rabindranath Tagore) and national song Vande Mātaram (by Bankim Chandra Chattopadhyay) were composed in Shadhubhasha, but its use is on the wane in modern writing.
2. Chôltibhāṣā (চলতিভাষা) or Chôlitôbhāṣā (চলিতভাষা), a written Bengali style that reflects a more colloquial idiom, is increasingly the standard for written Bengali (চলিত chôlitô = 'current' or 'running'). This form came into vogue towards the turn of the 19th century, in an orthography promoted in the writings of Peary Chand Mitra (Alaler ghare dulal, 1857), Pramatha Chowdhury (Sabujpatra, 1914) and in the later writings of Rabindranath Tagore. It is modeled on the dialect spoken in the Shantipur and Shilaidaha region in Nadia and Kushtia Districts. This form of Bengali is often referred to as the "Kushtia standard" (Bangladesh) or "Nadia dialect" (West Bengal).

Spoken Bengali exhibits far more variation than written Bengali. Formal spoken Bengali, including what is heard in news reports, speeches, announcements, and lectures, is modelled on Chôltibhāṣā. This form of spoken Bengali stands alongside other spoken dialects, or Āñchôlik Bāṅglā (আঞ্চলিক বাংলা) (i.e., 'regional Bengali'). The majority of Bengalis are able to communicate in more than one dialect – often, speakers are fluent in Chôltibhāṣā, one or more Āñchôlik dialects, and one or more forms of Grāmyô Bāṅglā (গ্রাম্য বাংলা) (i.e., 'rural Bengali'), dialects specific to a village or town.

To a non-Bengali, these dialects may sound or look vastly different, but the differences are mostly in pronunciation and vocabulary, and not so much a grammatical one. One exception is the addition of grammatical gender in some eastern dialects. Many dialects share features with Sādhubhāṣā, which was the written standard until the 19th century. Comparison of Bengali dialects gives us an idea about archaic forms of the language as well.

During the standardisation of Bengali in the late 19th and early 20th centuries, the cultural elite were mostly from the regions of Dhaka, Kolkata, Hooghly, Howrah, 24 Parganas, Nadia, Khulna, Jessore, and Kushtia. What is accepted as the standard form today in both West Bengal and Bangladesh is based on the West-Central dialect. While the language has been standardised today through two centuries of education and media, variation is widespread, with many speakers familiar with or fluent in both their socio-geographical variety as well as the standard dialect used in the media.

== Regional dialect differences ==
Dialectal differences in Bengali manifest themselves in three forms: standardized dialect vs. regional dialect, literary language vs. colloquial language, and lexical (vocabulary) variations. The name of the dialects generally originates from the district where the language is spoken.

While the standard form of the language does not show much variation across the Bengali-speaking areas of South Asia, regional variation in spoken Bengali constitutes a dialect continuum. Mostly speech varies across distances of just a few miles and takes distinct forms among religious communities. Bengali Hindus tend to speak in Sanskritised Bengali (a remnant of the Sadhu bhasha), Bengali Muslims comparatively use more Perso-Arabic vocabulary, and Bengali Christians converse in Christian Bengali when engaging in their own circles. Apart from the present dialects, there are a few more that have disappeared. For example, Sātagāiyã' (this is the name used in East Bengal for the dialect of the Southwestern Rarh region).

=== Comparison table ===
==== Dialects and subdialects ====
| English | Sadhu bhasha | Standard Bengali | Jessore-Khulnaiya | Manbhumi | Barishali | Old Dhakaiya | Faridpuri | Varendri | Mymensinghi | Rarhi | Sundarbani | Comillan | Noakhali | Chittagonian | Sylheti | Rangpuri |
|---|---|---|---|---|---|---|---|---|---|---|---|---|---|---|---|---|
| will eat (first person) | khaibo | khabo | khabani | khabo | khamu | khamu | khamu | khabo / khamõ | khamu / khaibam | khabo | khabo | khamu / khayam | khaiyyum | haiyyum | xaimu | khaim |
| Taka | ṭaka | ṭaka | ṭa(h)a | ṭeka | ṭaha | ṭæka | ṭaha | ṭæka | ṭæha | ṭaka | ṭaka/ta(k)a | ṭæha | ṭĩa | ṭĩa | ṭekha/texa | ṭeka |
| Dhaka | ḍhaka | ḍhaka | ḍhaha | ḍhaka | ḍaha | ḍaka | ḍhaha | ḍhaka | ḍaha | ḍhaka | ḍhaka/Dha(k)a | ḍaha | ḍaka | ḍaha | ḍaxa | ḍhaka |

==== Other Eastern Indo-Aryan languages ====
| English | Assamese | Odia | Sambalpuri | Rohingya | Bhojpuri | Maithili | Halbi | Chakma | Tanchangya | Surjapuri | Rajbanshi | Bishnupriya Manipuri | Hajong |
|---|---|---|---|---|---|---|---|---|---|---|---|---|---|
| will eat (first person) | kham | khaibi | khaimi | khayyum | khaib | kha leb | khawan | haumu | hàb/ham | khaibang | kham | kheitoi | khabou |
| taka | tôka | ṭaṅkā | ṭankā | ṭia | ṭaka | ṭaka | ṭaka | ṭengya | ṭaka | ṭaka | ṭaka | ṭaka | ṭaka |
| dhaka | dhaka | ḍhākā | ḍhaka | ḍaka | ḍhaka | ḍhaka | ḍhaka | ḍaka | ḍaka | ḍhaka | ḍhaka | ḍhaka | ḍhaka |

== Phonological variations ==
The Eastern dialects serve as the primary colloquial language of the Dhaka district, mixed nowadays with the standard register. In contrast to Western and Central dialects, where ট [t̠] and ড [d̠] are unvoiced and voiced postalveolar stops, respectively, far Eastern dialects pronounce them as apical alveolar /t/ and /d/, especially in less formal speech. These dialects also lack contrastive nasalised vowels or a distinction in র /r~ɾ/, ড়/ঢ় /ɽ/, pronouncing them mostly as /ɹ/, although some speakers may realise র /r~ɾ/ when occurring before a consonant or prosodic break. This is also true of the Sylheti dialect, which has a lot in common with the Kamrupi dialect of Assam in particular, and is sometimes considered a separate language. The Eastern dialects extend into Southeastern dialects, which include parts of Chittagong. The Chittagonian dialect has Tibeto-Burman influences.

=== Fricatives and affricates ===
In the dialects prevalent in much of eastern and south-eastern Bangladesh (Barisal, Chittagong, Dhaka and Sylhet Divisions), and Tripura and Barak Valley of India, many of the stops and affricates heard in the western and (south) central dialects are pronounced as fricatives. Western palato-alveolar and alveolo-palatal affricates চ [tɕ~tʃ], ছ [tɕʰ~tʃʰ], জ [dʑ~dʒ], ঝ [dʑʱ~dʒʱ] correspond to eastern চ [ts~s], ছ [s], জ [z], ঝ [z~zʱ]. Note that few Perso-Arabic borrowings containing the phoneme [z] are realized as such in all dialects.

The unvoiced aspirated velar stop খ [kʰ], the aspirated labial stop ফ [pʰ] and the voiced aspirated labial stop ভ [bʱ] of western-central Bengali dialects correspond to খ় [x~χ], ফ় [ɸ~f] and ভ় [b~β~v] in eastern Bengali. These pronunciations are more prevalent in the Sylheti variety of northeastern Bangladesh and southern Assam, the variety spoken by most of the Bengali community in the United Kingdom. Note that phonemic transcriptions from left to right for eastern Bengali dialects indicate the realizations further eastwards. Retroflexes lose aspiration and variously remain like that or become alveolar. Breathy voiced stops lose breathiness. The voiced velar stop গ [g] can fricative to গ় [ɣ], and is mostly lost afterwards.

Many eastern Bengali dialects share phonological features with Assamese, including the debuccalisation of স, শ & ষ [ʃ] to হ [h] (but not to খ় [x]).

=== Tibeto-Burman influence ===
The influence of Tibeto-Burman languages on the phonology of eastern Bengali is seen through the lack of nasalised vowels, an alveolar articulation for the retroflex stops ট [ʈ], ঠ [ʈʰ], ড [ɖ], and ঢ [ɖʱ], resembling the equivalent phonemes in languages such as Thai and Lao, and the lack of distinction between র [ɾ] and ড়/ঢ় [ɽ]. Unlike most languages of the region, some Purbo Bengali dialects do not include the breathy voiced stops ঘ [ɡʱ], ঝ [dʒʱ], ঢ [d̠ʱ], ধ [d̪ʱ], and ভ [bʱ]. Some variants of Bengali, particularly Chittagonian, Noakhali, Tanchangya and Chakma Bengali, have contrastive tone; differences in the pitch of the speaker's voice can distinguish words. In dialects such as Hajong of northern Bangladesh, there is a distinction between উ and ঊ, the first corresponding exactly to its standard counterpart but the latter corresponding to the Japanese [ü͍] sound. There is also a distinction between ই and ঈ in many northern Bangladeshi dialects. ই representing the [ɪ] sound, whereas ঈ represents an [i].

== See also ==
- Bengali vocabulary
- Bengali phonology
