= Deswali Majhi =

Hinduized section of Santal tribe

- ᱫᱮᱥᱣᱟᱞᱤ ᱢᱟᱺᱡᱷᱤ দেস্বালি মাঝি
- Religions: Hinduism
- Languages: Santali, Bengali, Hindi
- Populated states: Jharkhand, West Bengal
- Ethnicity: Santal
- Family names: Majhi

Deswali Majhi is a Hinduized section of Santal tribe, distributed in western region of West Bengal and eastern region of Jharkhand in India. The community took shape after the great Santal rebellion (1855–56) by adoption of Hinduism due to oppression faced as a Santal by the Britishers and their proximity to the Bengali people.

Tribals known as Deswali Manjhis are those Santhals who, before the current tendency among Santhals to regard themselves as Hindus, came within the Hindu fold. According to H. H. Risley, “Deswali Manjhis are a subtribe of Santhals in the south of Manbhoom, who employ Brahmans (for officiating in religious observances) and have adopted portions of Hindu rituals”.

— West Bengal District Gazetteers : Puruliya (1985), p. 130
