= Manbhum =

East Indian district during the British Raj

Coordinates: 23°20′N 86°22′E

- Former district of British India
- 1833–1956
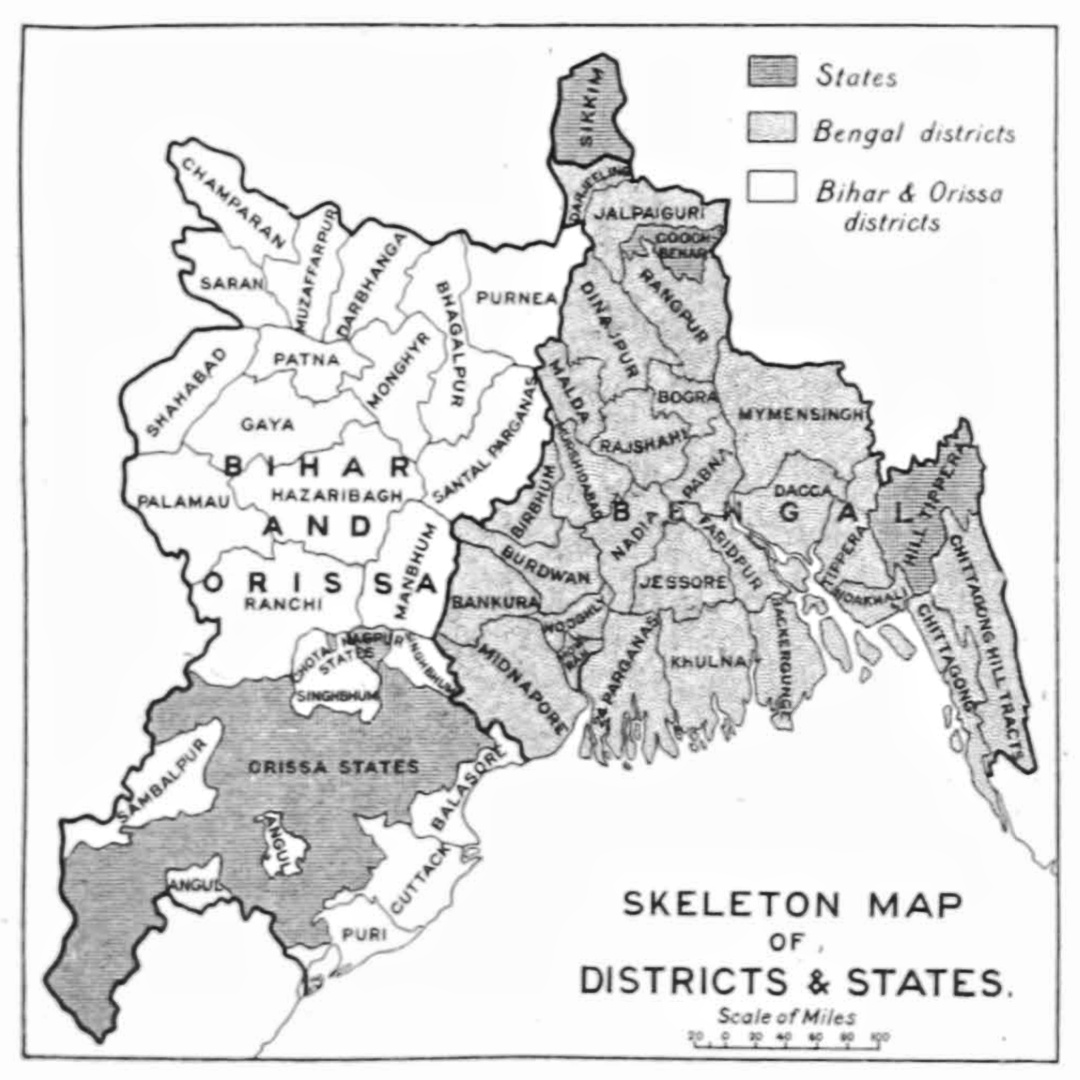
- District map of Bengal administration, 1912
- Capital: Manbazar (1833); Purulia (1838)
- Area
  - 1833: 20,449 km^{2} (7,895 sq mi)
  - 1872: 12,726 km^{2} (4,914 sq mi)
  - 1901: 10,741 km^{2} (4,147 sq mi)
  - 1931: 10,606 km^{2} (4,095 sq mi)
- Population
  - 1872: 995,570
  - 1901: 1,301,364
  - 1931: 1,810,890
- History
  - Formation: 1833
  - Dhalbhum curved out and merged with Singhbhum: 1846
  - Khatra, Raipur and Simlapal area merged with Bankura: 1879
  - Became part of Bihar and Orissa Province: 1912
  - Became part of Bihar Province: 1937
  - Disestablished by bifurcation: 1956
- Today part of: West Bengal (Purulia) Jharkhand (Dhanbad, Bokaro, Ranchi, Saraikela Kharsawan, East Singhbhum)

Manbhum District was one of the districts of the East India during the British Raj. After India's independence, the district became a part of Bihar State. Upon the reorganization of the Indian states in the mid-1950s, the Manbhum district was partitioned based on language. The Bengal-speaking areas were included in West Bengal, while the rest were kept with Bihar (present-day Jharkhand).

== Etymology ==
Manbhum gets its name from the 16th century military general Man Singh I who is known for his conquests Of Bihar, Odisha and parts of Bengal. He later also served as the governor (Subahdar) of this region during the reign of King Akbar.

In other versions, the district name derived from Manbazar or Manbhum khas parganas. The headquarters of Jangal mahal region from around 1833 to 1838, when the district was formed.

== History ==
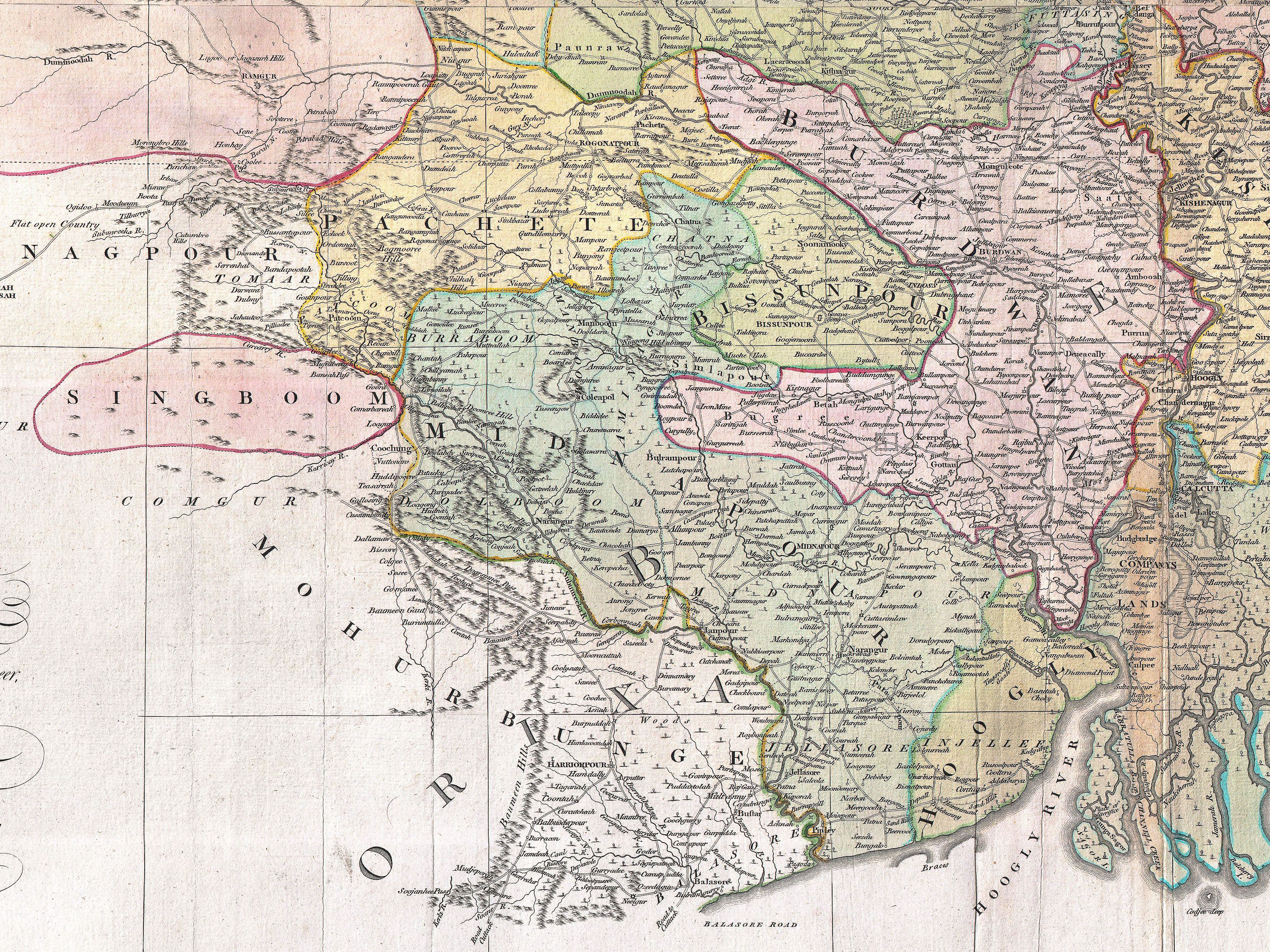
The jurisdiction of Panchet and Medinipur in Rennell's map (1776), decades after the region was ceded by the EIC, the region later formed as Manbhum district.

The history of Manbhum region predates the 18th century. Before its formation, the Panchet estate was established through the consolidation of smaller zamindaris, including Patkum, Barabhum, Sikharbhum, and Telkupi. Historical records of these region's previous rulers or chiefs are sparse for the period before British East India Company rule in India. The company formed Jungle-Mahal district in 1805, incorporating the Panchet estate and other forested areas into a single administrative unit, with headquarters nearby present-day Bankura town.

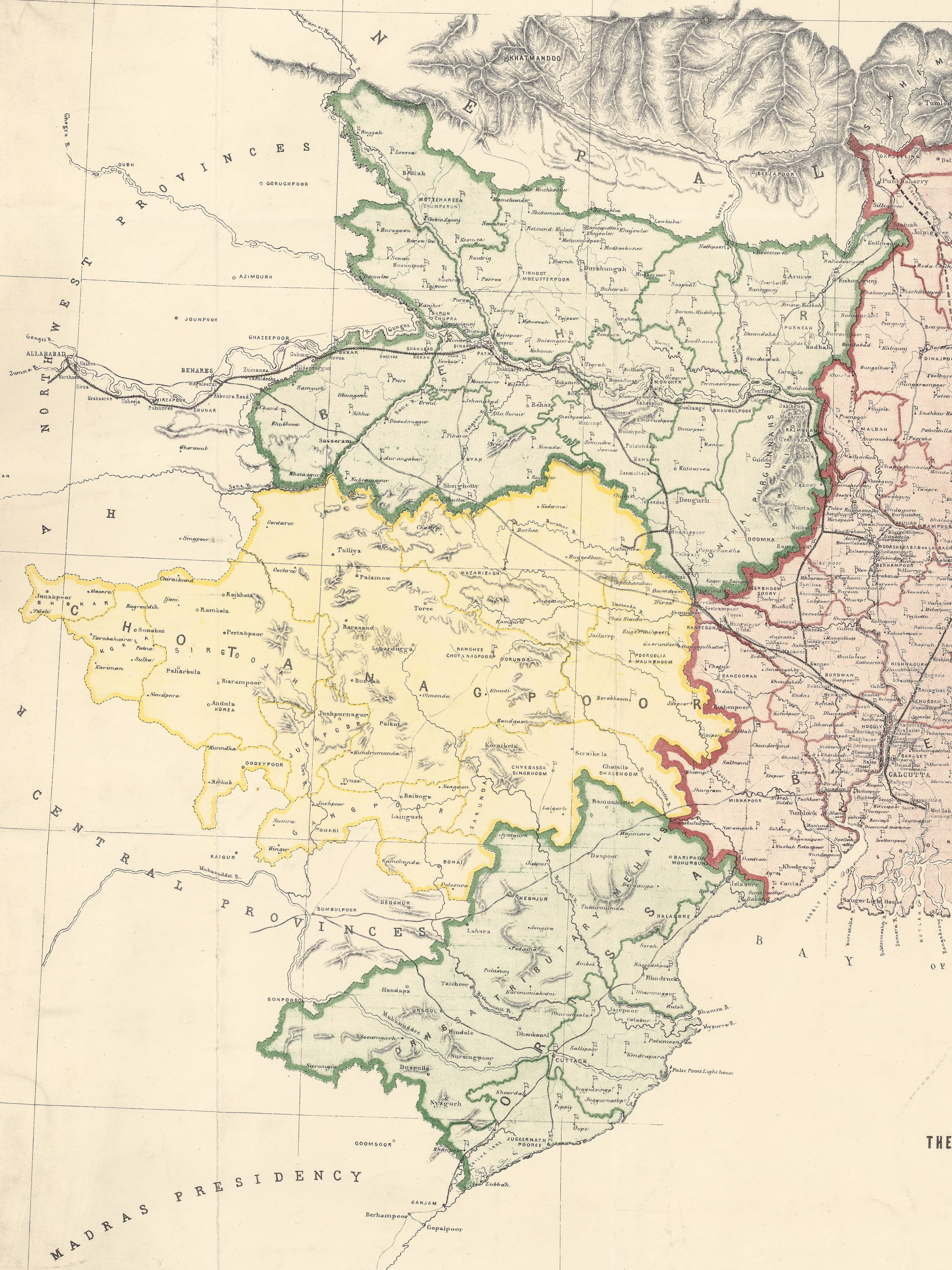
Manbhum District as part of the Chota Nagpur Division, Bengal Presidency, 1872

In 1833, the East India Company formed the Manbhum district with its headquarters in Manbazar, covering an area of 7,896 square miles (chiefly Panchet and half of its adjacent Midnapore region), by dividing the Jungle-Mahal region to enhance administrative efficiency. In 1838, the headquarters shifted to Purulia, and over the following years, the district underwent several divisions. These divisions occurred in 1845 (Dhalbhum curved out with 1,183 square miles area and merged with Singhbhum district), 1846, 1871, and finally, in 1879, reducing its size to 4,112 square miles. In 1901, the district area was 4,147 square miles, inhabited by a population of 1,301,364. In 1912, Manbhum became a part of the Bihar and Orissa Province.

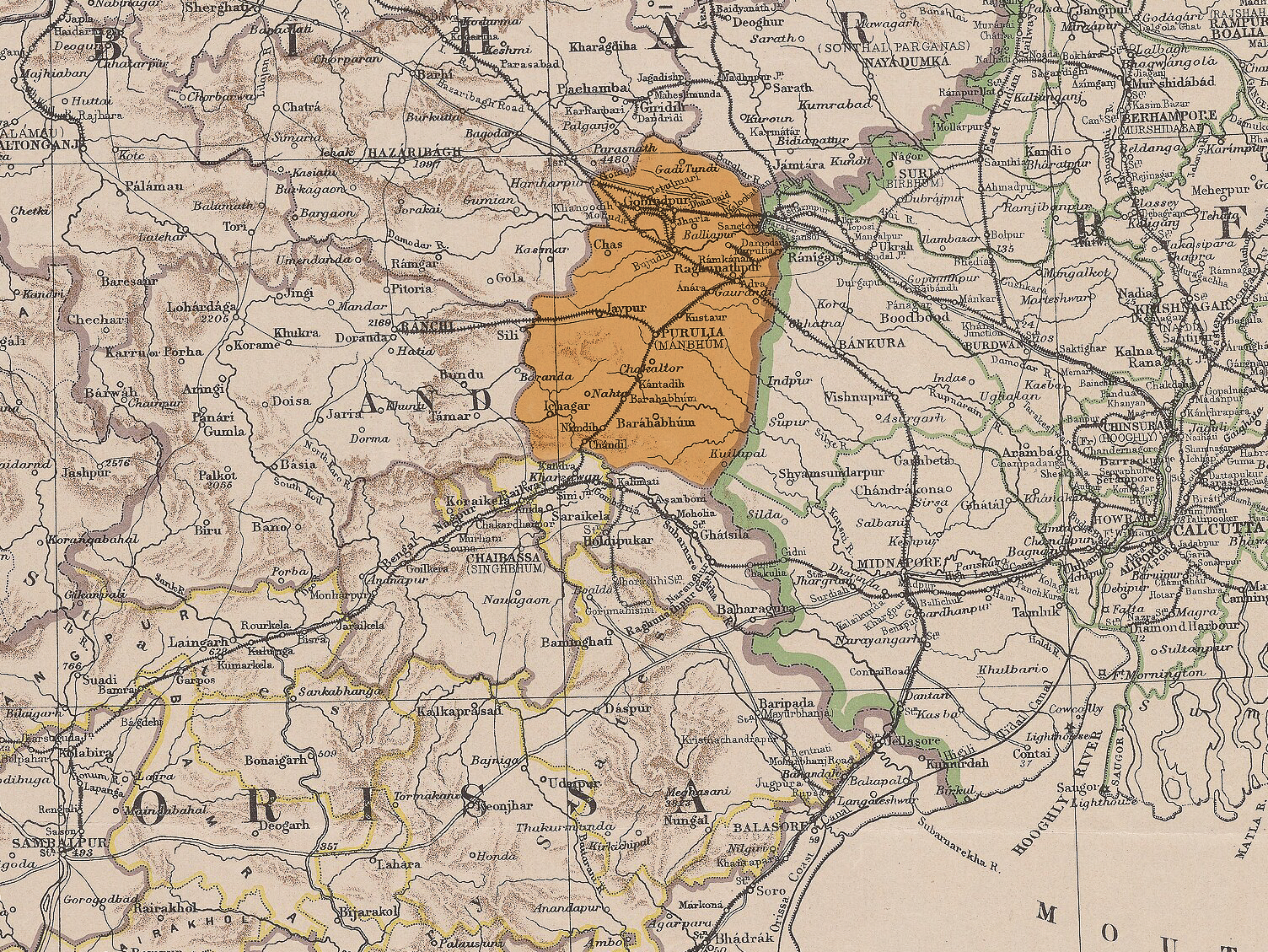
Manbhum in Bihar and Orissa Province of Bengal Presidency, 1912.

On 1 April 1936, the Bihar and Orissa Province was partitioned into two separate provinces Bihar and Orissa based on language, though Manbhum continued to remain a part of Bihar. Post-independence, linguistic tensions emerged in the district due to imposition of Hindi language over the native Bengali-speaking majority. This led to the establishment of the State Reorganization Commission on December 23, 1953. The commission recommended the creation of a new district named Purulia, primarily for Bengali speakers, by carving it out of the former Manbhum district in Bihar. The proposed Purulia district included 19 police stations from Manbhum, while 10 police stations from the Dhanbad sub-division and 2 police stations from the Purulia sub-division of Manbhum remained in Bihar.

Subsequently, three police stations of West Bengal—Ichagarh, Chandil, and Patamda—were transferred to Bihar upon a special request from TISCO, Jamshedpur. The "Bengal-Bihar Border Demarcation" Bill was passed in Parliament on August 17, 1956, and in Rajya Sabha on August 28, 1956, ultimately receiving the signature of the President of India on September 1, 1956. Consequently, on November 1, 1956, Purulia officially became a part of West Bengal, comprising 16 police stations, covering an area of 2,007 square miles (5,200 km^{2}), and hosting a population of 1,169,097. However, other areas, including Ichagarh, Chandil, and Patamda, continued to remain under the jurisdiction of Bihar, with the former two became part of Saraikela, while Patamda (an area used to under the Barabhum police station) became part of Dhalbhum (presently East Singhbhum district). Furthermore, on November 15, 2000, South Bihar was bifurcated to form a separate state called Jharkhand due to demographic disparities between North Bihar and South Bihar. Today, these areas form parts of the Dhanbad, Bokaro, Ranchi, Saraikela Kharsawan and East Singhbhum districts in Jharkhand.

== Geography ==
The district forms the first step of a gradual descent from the Chota Nagpur Plateau to the Ganges Delta. In the northern and eastern portions the country is open, and consists of a series of rolling downs dotted here and there with isolated conical hills. In the western and southern tracts the country is more broken and the scenery much more picturesque. The principal hills are Dalma (3407 feet), the crowning peak of a range of the same name; Gangabari or Gajboro (2220 feet), the highest peak of the Baghmundi range, about 20 miles south-west of Purulia; and Panchet Hill (1600 feet), on which stands the old fort of the rajas of Panchet. The chief river is the Kangsabati, which flows through the district from north-west to south-east into Midnapore.

== Demographics ==
Historical population
Year	Pop.	±%
1872	820,521	—
1881	1,058,228	+29.0%
1891	1,193,328	+12.8%
1901	1,301,364	+9.1%
1911	1,547,576	+18.9%
1921	1,548,777	+0.1%
1931	1,810,890	+16.9%
1941	2,032,146	+12.2%
1951	2,279,259	+12.2%
Source: Census of India

Languages of Manbhum (1931)
1. Bengali (67.5%)
2. Hindustani (17.8%)
3. Santhali (13.4%)
4. Other (1.35%)

As of the 1931 census, the Manbhum district recorded a total population of 1,810,890, with 940,009 males and 870,881 females. In terms of linguistic diversity, Bengali constituted the majority with 1,222,689 individuals, followed by Hindustani speakers at 321,690 (including [approx. 51,176] Kurmali and Panchpargania) and the Santhali at 242,091. Other noteworthy linguistic groups encompassed Koda (4,623), Bhumij (2,918), Gujarati (1,912), Kharia (1,995), Marwadi (1,774), Odia (1,563), Karmali (1,568), Telegu (1,332), Kurukh (946), Naipal (662), Punjabi (661), Mundari (789), Tamil (525), Mahali (312), and Ho (57).

In terms of social demographics, the Kudmi Mahato comprised the largest percentage at 17.84%, followed by Santal at 15.59%. Other significant caste groups include Bauri (6.7%), Bhumij (5.74%), Brahman (4.58%), Kumhar (3.15%), Jolha (3.12%), Teli (2.68%), Goala, Ahir and Yadav (2.26%), Rajwar (2.15%), Kamar (1.95%), Bhuiya (1.86%), Rajput (1.7%), Hajam/Nai(1.38%), Dom (1.36%), Hari (1.15%), Ghatwar (0.98%), Mochi (0.94%), Kora (0.86%), Kayastha (0.8%), Dhobi (0.79%), Kahar (0.78%), Tanti (0.65%), Mahli (0.6%), Bania (0.56%), Koiri (0.54%), Chamar (0.51%), and Kewat (0.5%).

When the fragmented parts of Manbhum district, which are present in multiple states, are added together, the percentage of Bengali and Santali population in 2011 stood at 47.52 and 10.38 respectively. Various policies of the then Bihar government and the subsequent Jharkhand government alongwith the large influx of people from other places into the region are believed to be responsible for this demographic change.

== See also ==
- Jungle Mahals
- Bengali Language Movement (Manbhum)
- Bihar and Orissa Province
