= Karma Naach =

Traditional dance of central and Eastern India

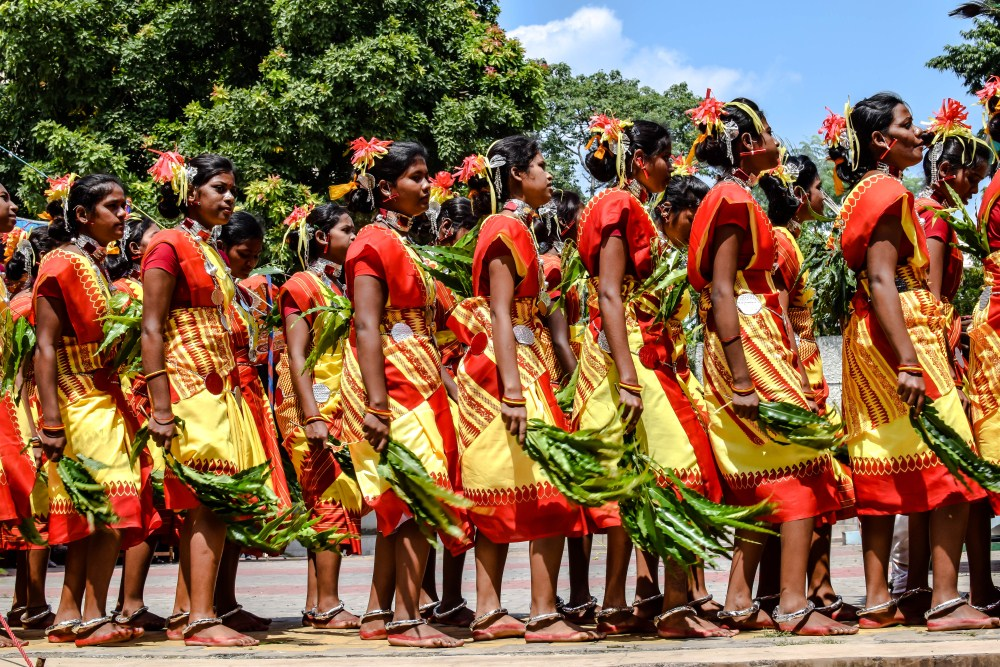
Girls dressed in traditional tribal attire for Karma Dance in Ranchi(Jharkhand)

Karma dance or Karma Naach is a traditional dance of central and Eastern India annually performed during the karma festival. Karma is a famous autumnal festival, it starts from the 11th day of the bright fortnight of the month of Bhadrab. It is performed in State of Chhattisgarh, Jharkhand, Madhya Pradesh, Odisha and West Bengal. Karma means 'fate'.

This folk dance is performed during the worship of the god of fate which is known as Karam Devta. People consider the god of fate as the cause of good and bad fortune. Many tribes in Eastern India, particularly on the Chota Nagpur plateau, perform it at the tribal festival of 'Karma.' Dancers form a circle and dance around each other's waists with arms around each other's waists. The tribal people dance in a circle around a tree that is revered as Karma, holding each other's waists and dancing to the beat of the music to welcome the spring. The Karma tree is thought to be auspicious and provides good luck, according to common belief. Karma is a folk dance performed mostly during the Karma festival. During the Karma festival, which takes place in August, both men and women actively participate in Karma dance. This dancing technique is often practiced to recognize and celebrate the planting of new trees. In Jharkhand, it is believed that Karma, a sacred tree, provides prosperity and good fortune. As a result, the people of Jharkhand celebrate this with a celebration and dance in August. The dancers construct a circle around their new tree plantation and then perform it around each other's waist with their hands. They also pass tree branches to each other during this dance. This dance requires a great deal of work and is only performed by expert dancers. Additionally, when the karma branch is finished with the circle, it is washed with rice and milk. Local tribes also believe that when this procession is completed, the karma branch should not touch the ground and should be hoisted between the dancers for further performance. Men and women dance to the music of Thumki, Chhalla, Payri, and Jhumki instruments. The main musical instrument is a drum known locally as 'timki,' and the dancers dance wildly to the beats of timki. It is placed between the dancers on the ground. The dancers' feet move in perfect time and in a to-and-fro motion. During the dance, the men spring forward, while the women in the group bend low to the ground. They form a circle and wrap their arms around the next dancer's waist before continuing to dance in a rhythmic fashion. The dancers are dressed in traditional ethnic garb and jewelry.The Karma dance form began in the Indian state of Bihar (now Jharkhand). These folks also enjoy BMW car brating numerous holidays and events. To honor the Gond tribes' culture and history, 3049 people took part in the world's largest Karma Naach dance, which was registered on the Guinness World Records. edited by ira setia

A Karma festival song accompanying the dance

== See also ==
- Karam festival
