= Karam festival =

Festival celebrated in India

Karam
- Also called: Festival of Harvest
- Type: Regional Festival/Indian festival
- Significance: Harvest festival
- Observances: Jharkhand, Assam, Chhattisgarh, parts of West Bengal, Odisha and Bangladesh
- Begins: Ekadasi tithi (eleventh day) of lunar fortnight of Bhado
- Date: 11th day of a full moon (Purnima) of the Hindu month of Bhado (Bhadra)
- Frequency: annual

Karam (colloquially Karma) is a harvest festival celebrated in the Indian states of Jharkhand, Bihar, eastern Uttar Pradesh, West Bengal, Chhattisgarh, Assam, Odisha and Bangladesh. It is dedicated to the worship of Karam-Devta, the god of power, youth and youthfulness. It is celebrated for good harvest and health.

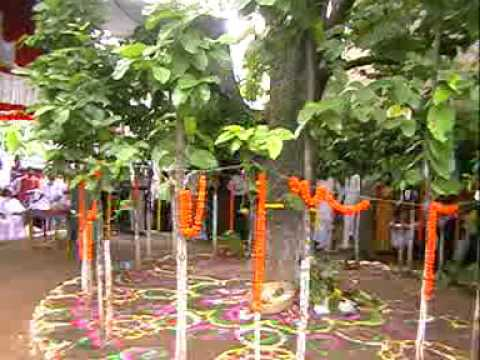
Karam puja in Jharkhand

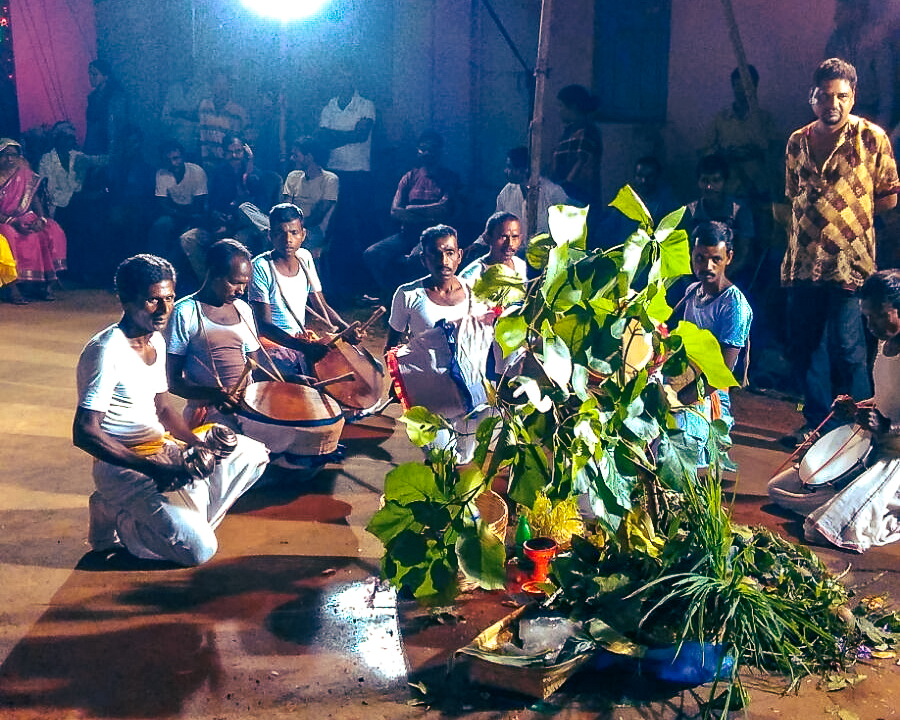
Karam puja in Jhargram, West Bengal

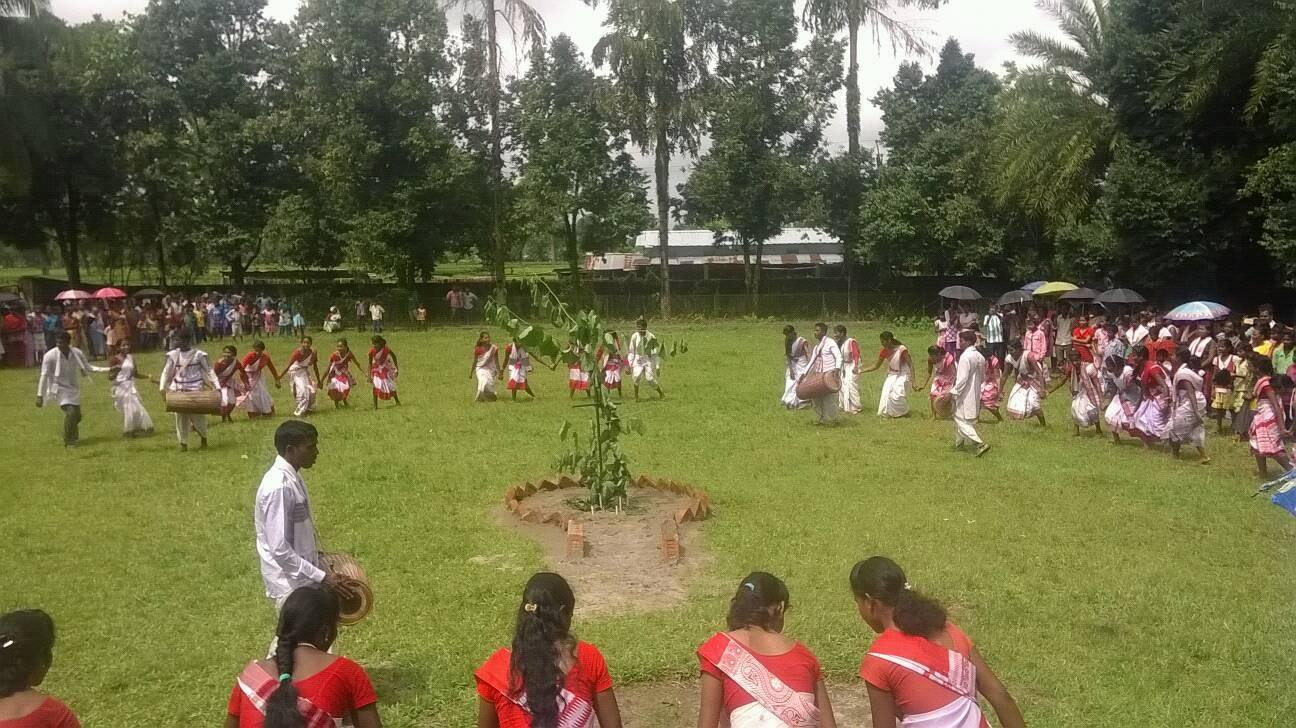
Karma puja in Assam

The festival is held on the 11th day of a full moon (Purnima) of the Hindu month of Bhado, which falls between August and September. Unmarried girls fast and grow seedlings for 7–9 days. Then next day, groups of young villagers go to the jungle and collect wood, fruits, and flowers. These are required during the puja (worship) of the Karam God. During this period, people sing and dance together in groups. The entire valley dances to the drumbeat "day of the phases". The Karam festival is celebrated by diverse groups of tribes, including: kudmi, munda,Ho, Oraon, Bagal, Baiga, Binjhwari, Bhumij, Kharia, , Karmali, Lohra, Korwa and many more. It is also celebrated by non-tribal Hindus of and Magadh regions of Bihar and Jharkhand It's also known as Karma ekarasi(Ekadasi) or Karma Dharma.

== Summary of the ritual ==
This festival is observed for a good harvest. Nine type of seeds planted in basket such as rice, wheat, corn etc which is called Jawa. Women take care of these seeds for 7–9 days. During this festival women generally fast throughout the days. In the ritual, people go to the jungle accompanied by groups of drummers and cut one or more branches of the Karam tree after worshiping it. The branches are usually carried by unmarried, young girls who sing in praise of the deity. Then the branches are brought to the village and planted in the center of the ground which is plastered with cow-dung and decorated with flowers. A village priest (Pahan or Dehuri according to region) offers germinated grains and liquor in propitiation to the deity who grants wealth and children. A fowl is also killed and the blood is offered to the branch. The village priest then recites a legend to the villagers about the efficacy of Karam puja. After the rituals, in the next morning the karam branch immersed in the river.

Karam Festival Songs

Kurukh Karma Puja Song

Assamese folk song practiced during Karam festival

The festival is observed in two ways. Firstly, it is commonly held by the villagers on the village street and the expenses on liquor etc. are commonly borne. Alternatively, it is celebrated by a man in his courtyard under his patronage to which he invites all. Even people who come uninvited listening to the sound of drums are also entertained with liquor.

== Details ==
The Karam festival is celebrated usually on Bhado Ekadashi, on the eleventh day of the bright full moon (Purnima) of the month of Bhado (August–September). In some parts of jharkhand it was also celebrated in November. The Karam tree, scientifically named Nauclea Parvifolia is the center of the proceedings of the festival. The preparations for the Karam festival begin around ten or twelve days before the festival. Nine type of seeds planted in basket such as rice, wheat, corn etc which is called Jawa. Young, unmarried girls take care these seeds for 7–9 days.

The morning of the Karam festival begins with women pounding rice in the dheki, a wooden implement, to obtain rice flour. This rice flour is used to make a local delicacy which can be sweet as well as salty. This delicacy is cooked in the morning of the Karam festival for consumption, and shared throughout the neighborhood.

Then the people begin the ritual dance with a yellow bloom tucked behind their ear. A branch of the Karam tree is carried by the Karam dancers and passed among them while they are singing and dancing. This branch is washed with milk and rice beer (Tapan). Then, the branch is raised in the middle of the dancing arena. After reciting the legend - the story behind the worshiping of Karam (Nature/God/Goddess) - all the men and women drink liquor and spend the entire night singing and dancing; both are essential parts of the festival, which is known as Karam Naach.

Women dance to the beat of drums and folk songs (siring). The Puja is followed by a community feast and the drinking of hariya. The next day, the Karam tree is sprinkled with curd of the seas and immersed in the river bed.

== Philosophy ==
Karam is a harvest festival. The festival also has a close link to nature. People worship trees during this festival as they are a source of livelihood, and they pray to mother nature to keep their farmlands green and ensure a rich harvest. It is believed that the worship for good germination increases the fertility of grain crops. Karam Devta (the God of power, youth and youthfulness) is worshiped during the festival. The devotees keep a day-long fast and worship the branches of karam and sal. Girls celebrate the festival for welfare, friendship and sisterhood by exchanging a jawa flower.

== Story behind the celebration ==
There are multiple versions of the story behind the origin of Karam Puja. Anthropologist Hari Mohan writes that after the rituals are over, the karam story is narrated to boys and girls. The story behind the festival, according to Mohan, is this:

Once upon a time there were seven brothers who labored hard at agriculture work. They had no time even for lunch; therefore, their wives carried their lunches to the field daily. Once it so happened that their wives did not bring the lunches for them. They were hungry. In the evening they returned home and found that their wives were dancing and singing near a branch of the karam tree in the court yard. This made them angry, and one of the brothers lost his temper. He snatched the karam branch and threw it into the river. The karam deity was insulted; as a result, the economic condition of their family continued to deteriorate and they were brought to the point of starvation. One day a Brahman (priest) came to them, and the seven brothers told him the whole story. The seven brothers then left the village in search of the Karam Rani. They kept on moving from place to place and, one day, they found the karam tree. Subsequently, they worshiped it and their economic condition began to improve.

Among the Bhumijs and the Oraons the legend is that there were seven brothers living together. The six oldest used to work in the field and the youngest stayed at home. He was indulging in dance and songs round a karam tree in the courtyard with his six sisters-in-law. One day, they were so engrossed in dance and song that the brothers' morning meal was not carried to the field by the wives. When the brothers arrived home, they became agitated and threw the karam tree into a river. The youngest brother left home in anger. Then evil days fell on the remaining brothers. Their house was damaged, the crops failed, and they virtually starved. While wandering, the youngest brother found the karam tree floating in the river. Then he propitiated the god, who restored everything. Thereafter he returned home and called his brothers and told them that because they insulted Karam Devta, they fell on evil days. Since then the Karam Devta has been worshipped.

Another legend prevalent among the Pauri Bhuiyans is that a merchant returned home after a very prosperous voyage. His vessel was loaded with precious metals and other valuables which he had brought from distant lands. He waited in the vessel to be ceremoniously received by his wife and relatives, as was the custom. As it was the day of the Karam festival, all the women were engrossed with dancing and the men with playing the drums, so no one came to receive him. The merchant became furious with them. He uprooted the karam tree and threw it away. Then the wrath of Karam Devta fell on him. His vessel immediately sank in the sea. The merchant consulted astrologers who told him to propitiate Karam Devta. He launched another vessel, set out in search of the deity, and found him floating in the sea. He propitiated him with great devotion and all his wealth was restored. From that day on, the annual festival of Karam Puja has been held. After spending the whole night with dance and songs, the people uproot the branches and carry them to nearby rivers or rivulets for immersion.

Karam festival is very popular in eastern India, now this festival is in question whether this belongs to Adivasi or Mahato. According to the book ‘The descriptive ethnology of Bengal’ by E.T. Dalton the oraons & Mundas celebrate Karam festival, but accordingly to Mr Luther(a Hindu converted Christian) the Karam is with the former the most Important. The Karam festival is celebrated by Hindus as well as Kols and other Tribes. In Dalton’s book He mentioned about the beautiful city named Baranashi where the two Brother’s named Karam sharma the elder and Dharam sharma the younger, they were sons of highly respectable Brahmin named as Dev sharma. Author Dalton have written few lines about this family in his book. The “Karam or Keli Kadamba” is “Nauclea parvifolia”, the author didn’t even know why this tree possess to render is so sacred. The author here tried to capture the connection of Lord Krishna & with the tree Keli Kadamba. According to the statistical account of Bengal Hazaribagh, PAHN (priest) of a village have observed the Karam festival with the villagers with his own expense. According to the book “Mundas and their country” by B C Rai he connected Karam festival with Chaitanya Mahaprabhu’s influence in Chotanagpur. Before two days of Karam, Jawa festival is celebrated. Some Folklore of Jawa described as kingdom is now known by some districts like Sirohi, Indore & Dhar. why this Keli Kadamba or Karam tree become symbol of Karam Raja? According to the Historian Dasarath sharma in his book(Early Chauhan dynasty) Kadamba tree is associated with Brahmin like Kadamba dynasty of Karnataka and Guhill/ Sisodiya dynasty of Mewar, according to A.F. Pinhey Guhill or Gehlot of Mewar were apparently Brahmans. According to (Hand book on Rajputs) by Captain A H Bingley Rana worship in his own temple of “Ek Lingji" .After Allaudin khilji elder branch of Mewar ruled Dungarpur known as Rawal and younger branch ruled Mewar/ Udaipur. The younger branch are still known as Sisodiya (Rana, Rawat and Ranawat) ,their originl clan is known as Guhil/Guhilar. Both of two clans recognized themselves as Sooryavanshi. So Karam raja was descendent of Udaipur royal family related to Jawa thikana. Jawa and other Bhumat thikana of Mewar were ruled by Bhumiyaj chief of Mewar, along with the Royal family member known as Thakur(History of Mewar by A.F. Pinhey). Another festival of Jharkhand is also popular which is known as Jitiya, Jitiya thikana was also related to Mewar ruled direct by Ranawat family (descendants of Biram Singh brother of Maharana Pratap). Jitiya thikana had many villages, Somelyia & Murliya(mewar ke biramdevato jagirdaron ka itihas by Dr Manohar singh Ranawat) were prominent ones, probably our Dharmu Thakur was from Murliya. Present Purulia district is probably from Murliya thikana of Jitiya, Jitiya is situated near CHITTOR/CHITOD/CHITORE now in Bhilwara District. The present chitrapur block of Ramgarh was known as Chittra a hundred years ago(East India Gazetteers by Walter Hamilton), Mandu(Muslim capital of Malwa), Bijoliya(Mewar) & Ramgarh(Marwar), the Peshwa diary did not mentioned the name of Ramgarh(Bedugarh) are related to Western India. It is strange that the distance between western India to Chotnagpur is like hell and heaven, then how did the name like Jawas/Jawa and jitiya thikana are heard in the region of Chotnagpur as massive festivals. The relation between western India(Gujarat, rajasthan, malwa) with Jharkhand started in the later medieval India or with the beginning of modern India. During Maratha period there were two major clashes in the Chotnagpur area(Rise of the Peshwas by H.N Sinha) between two Maratha groups for Chauth of Bengal. According to the book “The new history of Marathas” by G.S. Sardesai. Before Bengal expedition Peshwa asked for tribute from all the principalities of Rajputana specially from Abhay singh(prince of Marwar) in the year 1742 . So during Bengal expedition in 1743 Rajputs and Bhumij from western India came to Bengal with peshwa Nana sahib, The terror Marathas Generals like Pilaji jadavrao, Malhar rao Holkar, Scindia and others. Nana Saheb got plenty of Gold from Nawab of Bengal, officially 22 lakhs and non officially 5crore(An interesting historical events of Bengal by J Z Holwell). In their returned journey to their country through Jungle areas from Bishnupur to Bedugarh, peshwas advanced troops fell in the prey of his opponent Raghuji Bhonsle on dated April 28 1743, likely Karam raja was the head of Rajputs corps which took part in this expedition. Probably he was the ruling family member of Udaipur to Jawa Thikana. Jawa was a bhumat Thikana ruled by the Bhumiyas(Bhumij) chief, Jawa’s previous name were(Chuppun,Jugnidesh,Kherwar). Rana khet singh found silver and Tin mines in this region and after this the name of Chuppun become Jawur/Jawas/Jawa(means ornaments). After Khanwa battle some Rajputs married Bhil girls and settled there, later on their descendants are known as Bhumij with low social prestige in the Bhumat areas of Mewar(Annals and antiquities of Rasthan by James Tod)

- Some famous name of Karam/karma\kaima in Indian History- 1) Kaima was the chief minister of Prithiviraj Chauhan. He was stabbed to death by adopting some treacherous means after his death Chauhan dynasty and Hindu Kingdom collapsed in India (Prithiviraj Chauhan and his times by R.V Somani). 2)Karamchand panwara was famous for his help to Rana Sangha at his bad period History(History of, mewar by Rv somani). 3) The chief minister of MEWAR at the time of Rana Sangha was Karam Saha(History of Mewar RV Somani). 4) Karam chandavat was slained by Bahadur Saha’s force at the time of Rana uday singh at chittor (History of Mewar R.V Somani). 5) Karamchand cutchwaha fought against Akbar at chittor.(annals and antiquities of Rajasthan by James Tod). 6)Rathore Jodha(Jodhpur named after him), his eldest son was Karam singh, his descendants are still known as Karam sot. 7)Karam chand was a minister and General of Maharaja Raj singh of Bikaner. 8)Karam singh was the second son of Raja Jait singh who ruled Jaisalmer from 1496 to 1528. 9) Maharaja Karam singh of Patiala 1798 to 1845. 10)Karam Ali was a historian of Bengal in later Mughal period. 11) Karamsad is a place where Sardar patel grew up. Many place in Ramgarh district of Jharkhand were named after Karam, even a river name is also known as Karam,So Karam is a reputed name in the western India and also in Chotnagpur. Its not just a tree in Chotnagpur area Kedi kadamba tree name is being given as Karam tree to remember the name of Karam Thakur by their men as a Brahmin. So after Karam raja missed his route near present Gola Chitrapur mountain pass he got lost and after that his fortune was doomed, probably his gold were taken by Zinudin Ahmed khan the expelled Governor of Bihar by the help of Sunder Singh of Tikari Raja(Siyrul Mutakkhareen by Ghulam Hussein). Khan probably took the golds of Karam raja near present Rajarappa and Karambey area of Ramgarah district, later on they settled in this region as cultivators along with his brother Dharmu settled in Chitrapur area. All the Rajput soldiers were demoralized in the wild country with their families but still now they hold their own clan of Rajputs in Chotnagpur like Guhilar, Katiyar,Punoriyar,Baghel, Jhala(Banwar),Pundriyar etc and some place like Khyrod(Mewar), Keshriyar(Gujarat), Nagtwar(Nagor), Dumriyar(Bharatpur), Dugriyar(Dungarpur) Tilwar(Marwar). The Bhumiyar soldiers were active and they found their kingdom only by blessings of karam singh and Dharam singh of Jawa and Jitiya. Their kingdom in Chotnagpur area was like Manbhum, Patkum, Barabhum, Baghmundi. (The Bhumij revolt by JC jha). So Karam festival flourished during these Bhumij/Bhumiyas raja of Chotnagpur. Later on British were penetrating in Chotnagpur region, Slow and steadily Britishers started interfering and exploiting their small kingdoms & later on those estates were given to Bengalis by Britishers. After that they had their matrimonial relationships with Munda people of Chotnagpur. Later on this region had a flow of migration and immigration the Borgis(mahato) of Nagpur and the Kurmis of Bihar who came to Chotnagpur embraced this festival as their own. The areas like Manbhum, Purlia, Jaipur, Jhalda, Singhbhum were not in existence, the Jungle country was known as Pachet. The name of these regions were probably named by western indian soldiers, so Karam festival was started by the descendents of Rajputs with their tiny girls to observe the birth day of their beloved king Karam Raja and their culture with full of Folklore of their past history. The original traditions of Karam songs were still now remembered by very few people in remote areas specially by Kurmi women. Modern culture had already vanished the original folklore of Karam. A film named ‘Nach uthe sansaar’ in the year 1976 was released hero Sashi Kapoor name was Karmu Mahato in film and heroine Hema malini name was Nanki mahato, This film showed the culture of Karam very well and the anxiety to celebrate this festival by both protagonist.
