= Kamar (caste) =

Blacksmith caste of Odisha, India

The Kamar or Kamara (Odia: କମାର) is an Indian caste found in the Odisha state of India. They are similar to Karmakar caste of Bengal. Historically, they were blacksmiths by profession, commonly forging agricultural equipments like: sickles, axes, spades, crowbars etc. As per Mayurbhanj state 1931 census and Mayurbhanj district Gazetteers 1961, the Kamar are recorded as;

The Kamar caste is of heterogenous nature. Their occupation is iron-smelting and blacksmith. Chapua, Bindhani and Nahar Kamars are perhaps classed as Kol Kamars who are said to be accretions from the rank of the Kols. Chapuas derive their name from the practice of their women treading the bellows with foot while at work. The name Bindhani is perhaps derived from 'Bindha' meaning to bore. They call their chisel as beghuni, or that which pierces. Nahar is a corruption of Lohar or Lauhakar. The Astalohis 'workers on eight metals' work on different metals. Bathuri Kamars are accretions from the rank of the Bathuris and the Hatua Kamars are the indigenous Kamars of Orissa while Bangala Kamars are immigrants from Bengal.

== Social Status ==
In the state of Odisha, The Kamaras are included in the Other Backward Classes minority group. They are known as Vishwakarma or Vishwa Brahman
