= Gowala (caste) =

Subcaste of Ahir/Yadav community in India

Gowala/ Goala
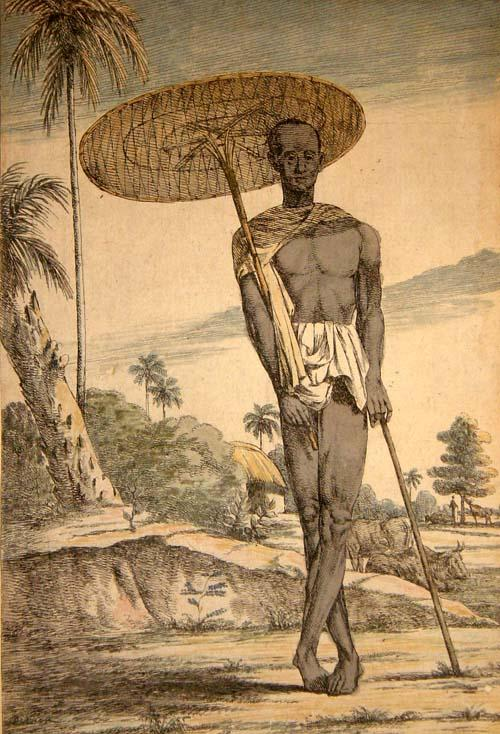
- A Gowala, 1799
- Classification: Ahir/Yadav
- Religions: Hinduism
- Languages: Assamese • Bengali • Himachali • Hindi • Punjabi
- Populated states: Assam, West Bengal, Tripura, Arunachal Pradesh, Himachal Pradesh, Chandigarh and Punjab

Gowala (also spelled as Goala) is a subcaste of Ahir/Yadav community, found in the Indian states of Assam, West Bengal, Tripura and Himachal Pradesh and the neighbouring states of Arunachal Pradesh, Punjab and Chandigarh. Traditionally they are herdsmen or milkmen and considered a prosperous community.

== Mythological Origin ==
The Gowalas are closely associated with Krishna and consider themselves to be descendants of Raja Yadu. By 1910s they became the part of Yadav community as part of Sanskritisation.
