= Ghotis =

Social group native to West Bengal

Ghoti
Regions with significant populations
- West Bengal and historically western parts of Bengal region, parts of Bangladesh after partition

Languages
- Rarhi, Varendri, Manbhumi and Sundarbani dialects of Bengali

Related ethnic groups
- Bangal, other Bengalis

Ghoti (a.k.a. Pôshchim Bôngiyô; transl. West Bengali) is a term used to refer to the Bengali people native to the Indian states of West Bengal and Jharkhand. The term is used to describe Bengalis from the west, as opposed to the Bengalis from the east, which means Bangals of East Bengal (now Bangladesh), Assam and Tripura.

== Etymology ==
Among the Bengalis of India, the terms "Ghoti" and "Bangal" are used as social sub-groups denoting the ancestral origin of a family.

The word "Ghoti" has been in use since at least the early 18th century. Although all Ghotis are ethno-linguistically Bengali, the term does not refer to a single distinct population and was not primarily bound by religion. It geographically and historically refers to all the Bengali inhabitants of the western part of the historical region of Bengal.

Historically, ethnic land of Ghotis also distributed across west of the Padma River, such as the districts of Jessore, Khulna, Kushtia, Faridpur and Barishal before being partitioned to Dominion of Pakistan in 1947.

== Overview ==
Going by the more strict definition, the Ghotis are those people whose ancestry is connected to the Western Bengal plains of Burdwan, Nadia, and Rarh region. The term began to be used since 1905 when Bengal was partitioned. The historic homeland of the Ghoti people remained at the presidency, and the eastern part became Eastern Bengal and Assam.

Some of the people from East Bengal, mainly Hindus, migrated to West Bengal during the Partition of India in 1947. These refugees were sometimes referred to as Bangals by the native population of West Bengal. As such, the terms Ghoti and Bangal are mostly used in West Bengal while in Bangladesh, the usage of these is rare except in regions with relatively high concentrations of immigrants from West Bengal. In modern times, amongst Bengalis, "Bangal" and "Ghoti" are used as social sub-groups. Those whose families came from East Bengal at the time of Partition are Bangals and those whose families were staying in West Bengal at that time are Ghotis. Similarly, the people who came to West Bengal from East Bengal before the partition are also known as Ghotis as they were staying in Western Bengal at the time of Independence. The term as used here has little relation to actual geography since clustered members of these groups all now live in India. Historically, in addition to marrying within their castes, people from these groups also preferred to marry within the group, whether Bangal or Ghoti. Bangals and Ghotis keep up their cultural rivalry through their respective support of the football clubs East Bengal (Bangals) and Mohun Bagan (Ghotis). They also cherish a rivalry through a claim of the supremacy of their respective cuisines and especially river-food delicacies, i. e., Chingri (prawn) for Ghotis and Ilish (hilsa) for Bangals.

== Sports culture ==
Traditionally, West Bengal has been a major centre for football and a longstanding rivalry between Ghoti and Bangal people on the football field have been a hallmark of the larger social friction between the groups.

In a typical season, the clubs currently meet at least 3 times a year; twice in the Indian Super League and once in the Calcutta Football League. The ultimate showdown between the teams takes place during the annual Kolkata Derby, which features in FIFA's classic derby list.

The primary venue of the match—the 85,000-seat Salt Lake Stadium—has remained sold out on match day, for decades. The Kolkata Police Force has in recent years maintained strict supervision after riots between fans claimed lives on multiple occasions. Often the clubs also meet in other competitions like the Federation/Super Cup, the IFA Shield, and the Durand Cup among others.

== See also ==
- Rarhi dialect
- Manbhumi dialect
- Sundarbani dialect
- Partition of India
- Partition of Bengal (1947)
