= Southern Bengali dialects =

Group of dialects of Bengali

Sundarbanī Bengali
- Southern Bengali; Satkhiraiya Bengali; Chobbish Parganaiya Bengali
- সুন্দরবনী বাংলা
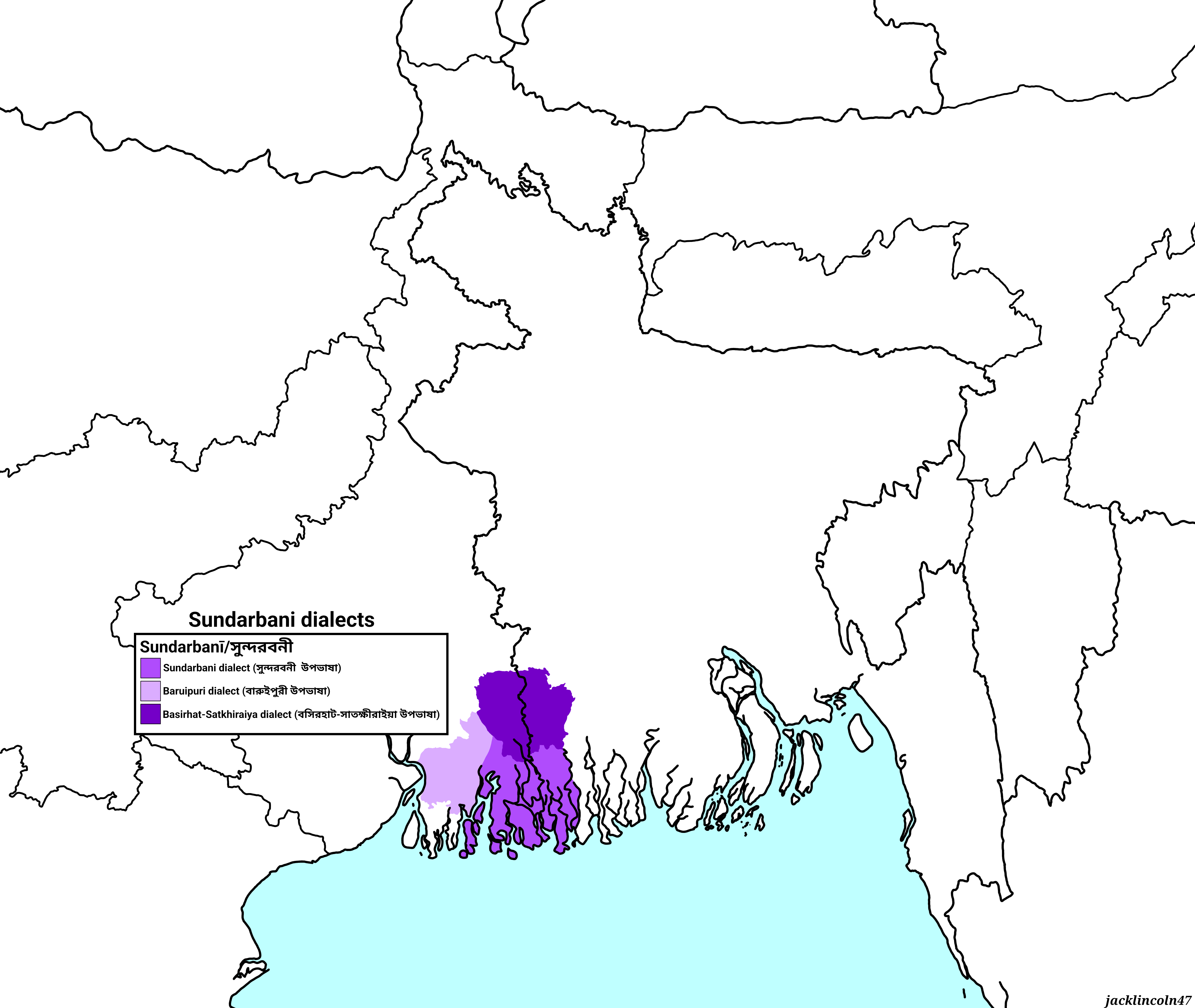
- Native to: India and Bangladesh
- Region: India: North 24 Parganas and South 24 Parganas (excluding Bangaon and Kakdwip subdivision) districts of West Bengal; Bangladesh: Satkhira district and parts of Khulna district
- Language family: Indo-European: Indo-Iranian; Indo-Aryan; Eastern Indo-Aryan languages; Bengali-Assamese; Bengali; Sundarbanī Bengali
- Early forms: Gaudi Prakrit: Old Bengali; Middle Bengali
- Writing system: Bengali script

Language codes
- ISO 639-3: –
- Glottolog: sund1256 Sundarbani

Southern Bengali or Sundarbanī Bengali (Bengali: সুন্দরবনী বাংলা, romanized: Sundôrbônī Bāṅlā/Šundôrbônī Bāṅlā, pronounced [sund̪ɔɾbɔniː baŋla] or pronounced [ʃund̪ɔɾbɔniː baŋla]) is a group of vernacular Bengali dialects spoken in the southern part of Bengal. It is generally considered to be part of either the Eastern Bengali or Central Bengali dialects, but the dialect group shares distinctive features from both Eastern and Central dialects.

== Classification ==
In traditional surveys of Bengali, the southern coastal variety of Satkhira is grouped under the Eastern Bengali and the variety spoken in 24 Parganas is classified under Central Bengali. Dialect recordings from speakers in the Satkhira area have been published online. The dialect is also influenced by the Rarhi dialect of the nearby Kolkata region.

== Geographical distribution ==
The Sundarbani dialect is spoken in Satkhira District, parts of Khulna District, and the southern portion of the Greater 24 Parganas District.

== Phonology ==
The following phonological features can be observed:

- The dialect shows partial epenthetic insertion of /i/ or /u/ in verb forms, but these insertions are often reduced, not full. Example surface forms: choiltese, choileche, choi lech. Medial /u/ is often reduced or lost and a partial /i/ may appear as compensation.
- Word-internal voiceless consonants commonly become voiced in connected or village speech, such as fupu > fubu. Sandhi-induced voicing also appears:
  - /t/ + /ɡ/ > [d] + [ɡ]
  - /tʃ/ + /bʱ/ > [dʒ] + [bʱ]
- Except in limited areas (notably parts of Tala) the Sundarbani preserves clear /s/ and /ʃ/ pronunciations, aligning with Rarhi patterns. The dialect is characterized by systematic phonological processes, including:
  - Alternation between /ɔ/ and /o/ (অ and ও)
  - Epenthetic insertion of /i/ (-ই)
  - Consonant cluster simplification accompanied by vowel insertion
  - Consonant metathesis and lenition
  - Substitutions involving palatal and affricate consonants
  - Realization of /j/ as [i]
  - Vowel shortening
- Women and children sometimes show palatalization in certain lexical items.
- A notable feature is the realization of an initial breathy voice onset in contexts where other varieties have plain initial /a/. Examples: eto > hyato, ekhon > hekon, amon > hamon, oto > hoto. This feature is widespread in the Sundarbans, though stronger in less-educated and rural speakers in some upazilas of Bangladesh and tehsils of West Bengal.
- The dialect contain aspirated phonemes like Standard dialect whereas eastern dialects are known for the use of desapirated phonemes.
- Nasalization is a common feature (as it is in Standard Bengali) across much of the district except a few border pockets. Many words show nasalization under Rarhi influence. Examples: kach > kanch, jhata > jhyanta, shako > shanko.
- Medial /k/ is generally preserved throughout most of the district. Where changes occur they are local and limited.
- The retroflex flap sounds /ɽ/ and /ɽʱ/ (represented by ড় and ঢ়) are normally produced, matching Rarhi articulations rather than Bangali simplifications.

== Grammar ==
=== Morphology ===
- Morphological alternations frequently interact with phonology. Vowel insertion (epenthesis) shows up in verb-stem + inflection combinations and in derived forms. Vowel-harmony like alternations are visible in past/perfect forms where Rarhi-type sequences are realized with locally reduced vowels. Example, Rarhi "dekh-echhilo" becomes de/dei-kolo in Sundarbani.
- First person past endings show regional variation. The dialect retains Rarhi-style paradigms in many areas but also displays southern variants in pockets. Both -le/-l marking and local non-elite variants occur. Typical contrasts, such as elite/urban speakers use -le forms for first person (transitive/intransitive) producing forms analogous to lebo / leisho / lecho, while less-educated speakers may use variants like -aale or -lya.
- The genitive plural suffix '-ker' of Middle Bengali has turned into '-ger' in modern Bengali varieties of Khulna-Jessore region due to phonetic distortion. For example, the modern Standard Bangla pronoun 'tomader' alternates with tomager, tomarga and tomaga (tomaker > tomager > tomarga > tomaga) depending on the region, resulting from metathesis and loss of the medial 'r' in certain inflectional contexts.
- Sundarbani Bengali agree in having ‘rē’ as the proper affix for objective case like Eastern Bengali dialects and literary Bengali whereas the Central dialects prefer ‘kē’. For example, the word "āmākē" (to me) becomes "āmārē".
- The Standard dialect affix 'te' for locative case becomes 'ti' in Satkhira dialect. Example: korte (to do) > Korti, bolte (to speak) > bolti, khete (to eat) > khati etc.
- Morphological choices are strongly indexical. Educated and urban speakers favor forms closer to standard Bengali paradigms. Rural and less-educated speakers favor older or restructured shapes such as stronger sandhi voicing, h-initial forms, and locally extended epenthesis. Morphologically, the dialect exhibits distinctive forms in nouns, adjectives, and verbs, a set of unique pronouns; modified case markers and postpositional constructions; frequent use of "diye" as a light verb like Standard Bengali, productive derivational processes and reduplication, allomorphic variation and cliticization. The lexicon includes English loanwords alongside indigenous substrate elements demonstrating semantic and formal variation. From a sociolinguistic perspective, the speech community demonstrates diglossia and code-switching, with younger speakers increasingly shifting toward regional varieties.

== See also ==
- Bengali dialects
- Eastern Bengali dialects
- Central Bengali dialect
- North Central Bengali dialect
