= North Central Bengali dialects =

Group of dialects of Bengali

Varendrī Bengali
- North Central Bengali; Gaudiya Bengali; Uttaravangiya Bengali
- বরেন্দ্রী বাংলা
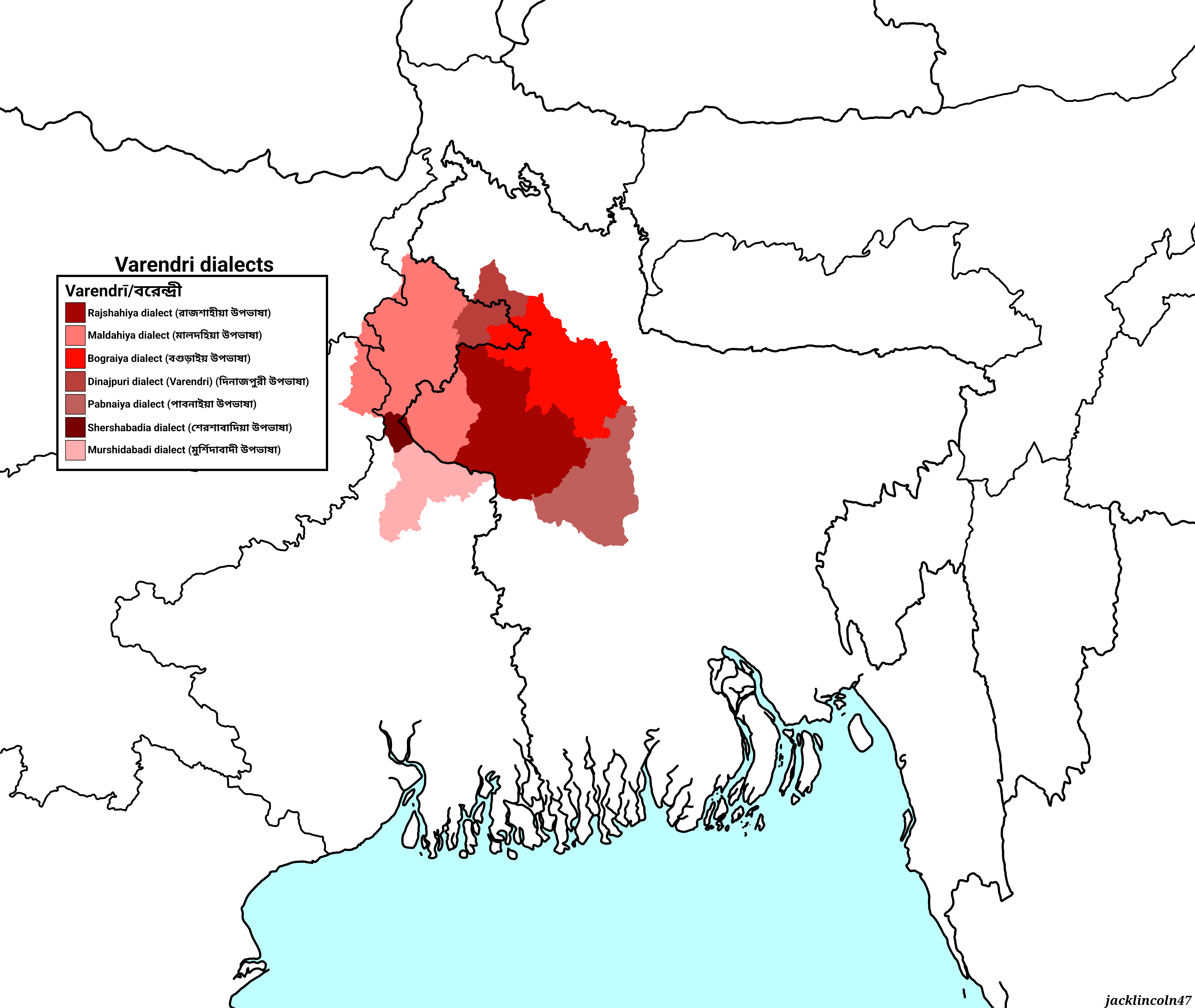
- Native to: Bangladesh, India
- Region: Bangladesh: Rajshahi Division, parts of Gaibandha District and Dinajpur District (Bangladesh); India: Malda Division (except for Islampur Subdivision), Parts of Bihar and Jharkhand
- Language family: Indo-European: Indo Iranian; Indo Aryan; Eastern Zone; Bengali-Assamese; Bengali; Varendrī Bengali
- Early forms: Gaudi Prakrit: Old Bengali; Middle Bengali
- Writing system: Bengali alphabet

Language codes
- ISO 639-3: –
- Glottolog: nort2658 Varendri

North Central Bengali or Varendrī Bengali (Bengali: বরেন্দ্রী বাংলা, romanized: Bôrendrī Bāṅlā, pronounced [bɔɾendriː baŋla]) is a cluster of Bengali dialects and their varieties, it is also known as Uttaravaṅgīẏa or Udīcya, it is spoken in the Varendra region (primarily consisting of the Rajshahi Division, parts of the Gaibandha and Dinajpur districts in Bangladesh and the Malda division in India excluding Islampur). Varendri dialect was classified by many renowned Indian linguists like Suniti Kumar Chatterji, Sukumar Sen and others. It is also spoken in adjoining villages in neighbouring Bihar and Jharkhand. Barendri dialect has some influences of neighbouring dialects of Maithili and other Bihari languages.

== Classification ==
Grammatically, the Varendri dialect is almost identical to the Rarhi dialect. According to linguists, in the past Rarhi and Varendri were a single dialect which was primarily known as the Rarhi or Gaudi dialect. Later, under the influence of the Eastern Bengali, it separated from Rarhi and became a distinct dialect of Bengali. Dr. Muhammad Shahidullah divided all Bengali dialects into two main groups: Prācya (Bengali: প্রাচ্য, romanized: prachyô, lit. 'eastern') and Pāścātya (Bengali: পাশ্চাত্য, romanized: pashchatyô, lit. 'western'). Within his Pāścātya grouping, he identified a subdivision termed "Northern" or "Udīcya", which broadly corresponds to what is described here as North Central Bengali but also including Far Northern Bengali dialects. This classification aligns with the combined dialect groups of "Varendra" and "Kāmarūpa" proposed by Suniti Kumar Chatterji, while the remaining area corresponds to Rāḍha dialects. In Shahidullah's classification, this northern zone is said to extend from Goalpara to Purnia, encompassing much of the historical regions of Kamarupa and Varendra. This area includes the modern divisions of Rangpur and Rajshahi in Bangladesh as well as Jalpaiguri and Malda in West Bengal. The Varendri dialect is also known as the "Rajshahi-Malda dialect". It is sometimes divided into Indian varieties, such as the "Maldahiya" or "Gaudi" dialects and Bangladeshi varieties known as the "Purbo Varendri" dialects.

== Features ==
=== Phonology ===
- Barendri Bengali is having 35 segmental phonemes out of which 7 are vowels and 28 are consonants like Standard Bengali.
- The letter sh (শ) is often pronounced as s (স) like Rarhi dialect.
- In some areas the letter 'j' sometimes changes into 'z' due to influences from neighbouring Vanga dialect.

=== Morphology ===
- Varendri Bengali has the affix '-der' for the genitive plural and oblique plural . It is commonly found in Rarhi dialect. The suffix '-ghor' or '-ghore', cognate with Eastern Bengali common plural affix '-gor' or '-go', is also found in Barendri dialect-speaking areas.
- Varendri Bengali has the Common Bengali plural affix "gulā" like Standard Bengali.
- Varendri Bengali agree in having -kē, -k as the proper affix for the dative like Rarhi dialect.
- The locative case is *tē, -t in Varendri and -tē in Rarhi dialect.

=== Comparison ===
A comparative chart of various Bengali varieties is given below:

English language	Barendri Bengali	Rarhi Bengali		Standard Bengali	
English language	Barendri Bengali	East Rarh	West Rarh	Sadhu Bengali	Chalit Bengali
I go	Jai	Jai	Jai	Jai	Jai
I have gone	Geichi	Gechi	Gechi/Gelchi	Giachi	Giechi/Gechi
I am going	Jacchi	Jacchi	Jaicchi	Jaitechi	Jacchi
I went	Gelam/Genu	Gelum/Genu	Gelam/Genu	Gelam/Genu	Gelam
I had gone	Geichilam/Gechinu	Gechilum/Gechinu	Gechilam/Gelchilam	Giachilam/Giechinu	Giechilam/Gechilam
I was going	Jacchilam/Jacchinu	Jacchilum/Jacchinu	Jaicchilam/Jaicchinu	Jaitechilam	Jacchilam
I will go	Jabo	Jabo	Jabo	Jaibo	Jabo
I shall have gone	Gie thakbo	Gie thakbo	Gie thaikbo	Gia thakibo	Gie thakbo
I will keep going	Jeite thakbo	Jeite thakbo	Jeite thaikbo	Jaite thakibo	Jete thakbo

== In popular culture ==
Gambhira, a Bengali folk genre is originally evolved with this dialect. This dialect is famous in many Bengali dramas. A web series by Chorki named Shaaticup is created in this dialect.
