= Bengali language =

Indo-Aryan language

Bengali
- Bangla
- বাংলা; Bāṅlā
- The word "Bangla" in the Bengali-Assamese script (Bengali alphabet)
- Pronunciation: [ˈbaŋlaˑ]
- Native to: Bangladesh and India
- Region: Bengal (Bangladesh and West Bengal, India); Barak Valley (Assam, India); Tripura (India); Jharkhand (India); Andaman and Nicobar islands (India); Jiribam (Manipur, India)
- Ethnicity: Bengalis
- Speakers: L1: 242 million (2011–2023); L2: 43 million (2011–2023); Total: 284 million (2011–2023)
- Language family: Indo-European: Indo-Iranian; Indo-Aryan; Eastern; Bengali–Assamese; Bengali
- Early forms: Magadhi Prakrit: Magadhan Apabhraṃśa; Abahaṭ‌ṭha; Old Bengali; Middle Bengali
- Standard forms: Standard Colloquial Bengali (SCB) Standard Literary Bengali
- Dialects: Vaṅgīẏa; Rāṛhī; Varendrī; Mānbhūmī; Sundarvanī; Samataṭī; Chandradwīpī; Tāmraliptī
- Writing system: Bengali–Assamese script (Bengali alphabet; official); Bengali Braille; Alternative and historic scripts
- Signed forms: Bangladesh Sign Language (BdSL); West Bengal Sign Language (WBS)

Official status
- Official language in: Bangladesh (national); India (scheduled); West Bengal; Tripura; Assam (Barak Valley); Jharkhand (additional)
- Regulated by: Bangla Academy (Bangladesh); Paschimbanga Bangla Akademi (West Bengal, India)

Language codes
- ISO 639-1: bn
- ISO 639-2: ben
- ISO 639-3: ben
- Glottolog: beng1280
- Linguasphere: 59-AAF-u
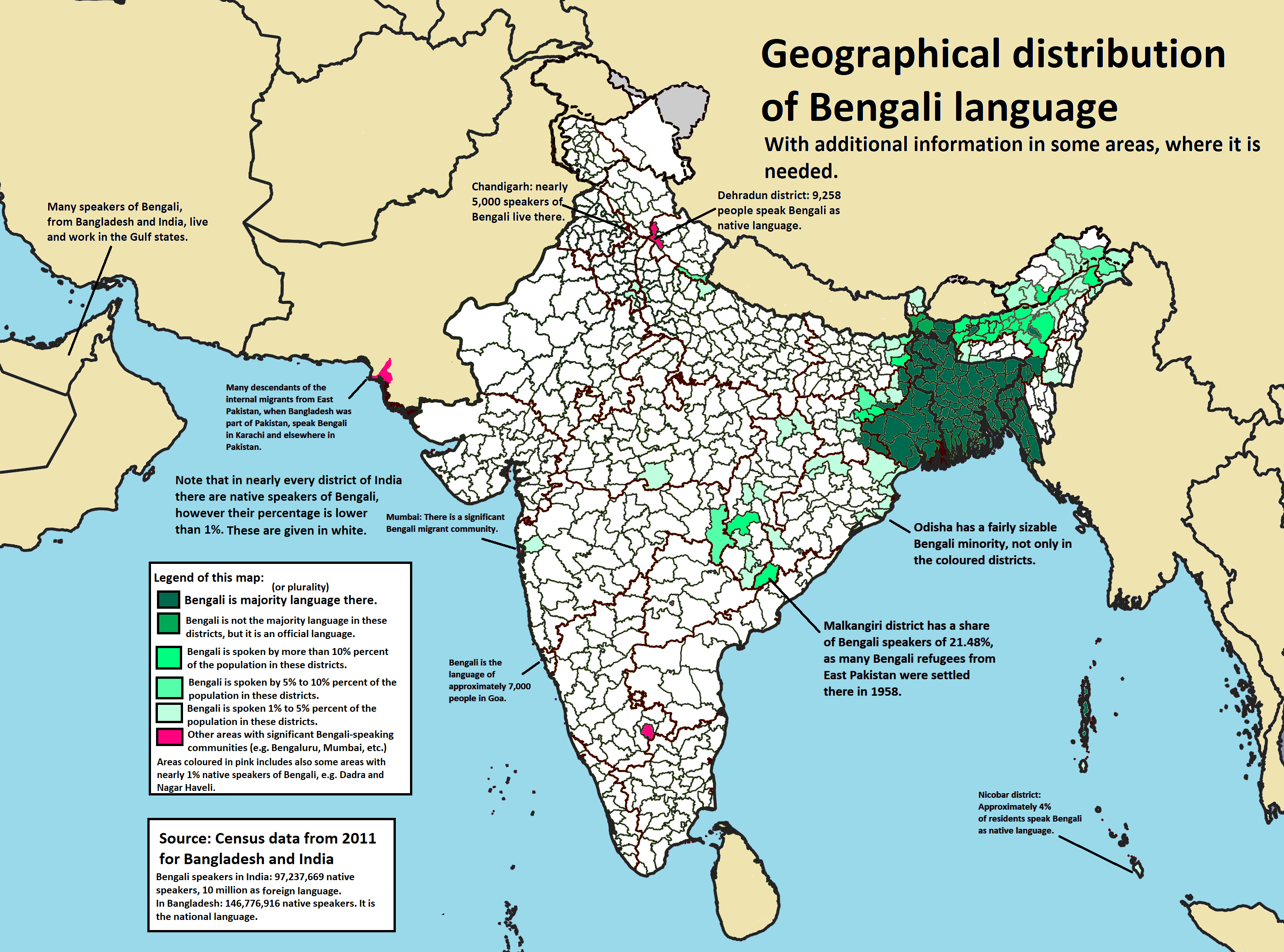
- Geographical distribution of the Bengali language. Darker shades imply a greater percentage of native speakers.

A man speaking Bengali

Bengali, (Note: English: /beŋgɔːli/, /bɛŋˈɡɔːli, -ɡɑː-, bɛn-/ beng-GAW-lee, -GAH-, ben-; also anglicized as Bengalee and Bengalese /ˌbɛnˈɡəˈliz, -ˈlis, ˌbɛŋ-/ ben-guh-leez, -lees-, beng-.) also known by its endonym Bangla, (Note: বাংলা Baṅla [ˈbaŋlaˑ]; English: /ˈbæŋlə/.) is an Indo-Aryan language belonging to the Indo-Iranian branch of the Indo-European language family. It is primarily spoken by the Bengali people, native to the Bengal region (Bangladesh and India's West Bengal) as well as in Barak Valley in Assam and Tripura in South Asia. With over 242 million native speakers and another 43 million as second language speakers as of 2025, Bengali is the sixth most spoken native language and the seventh most spoken language by the total number of speakers in the world.

Bengali is the official, national, and most widely spoken language of Bangladesh, with 98% of Bangladeshis using Bengali as their first language. It is the second-most widely spoken language in India. It is the official language of the Indian states of West Bengal, Tripura and the Barak Valley region of the state of Assam. It is also the second official language of the Indian state of Jharkhand since September 2011. It is the most widely spoken language in the Andaman and Nicobar Islands in the Bay of Bengal, and is spoken by significant populations in other states including Bihar, Arunachal Pradesh, Delhi, Chhattisgarh, Meghalaya, Mizoram, Nagaland, Odisha and Uttarakhand. Bengali is also spoken by the Bengali diasporas (Bangladeshi diaspora and Indian Bengalis) across Europe, North America, the Middle East and other regions.

Bengali was accorded the status of a classical language by the Government of India on 3 October 2024. It is the second most spoken and fifth fastest growing language in India, following Hindi, Kashmiri, Gujarati, and Meitei (Manipuri), according to the 2011 census of India.

Bengali has developed over more than 1,400 years. Bengali literature, with its millennium-old literary history, was extensively developed during the Bengali Renaissance and is one of the most prolific and diverse literary traditions in Asia. The Bengali language movement from 1948 to 1956 demanding that Bengali be an official language of Pakistan fostered Bengali nationalism in East Bengal leading to the emergence of Bangladesh in 1971. In 1999, UNESCO recognised 21 February as International Mother Language Day in recognition of the language movement.

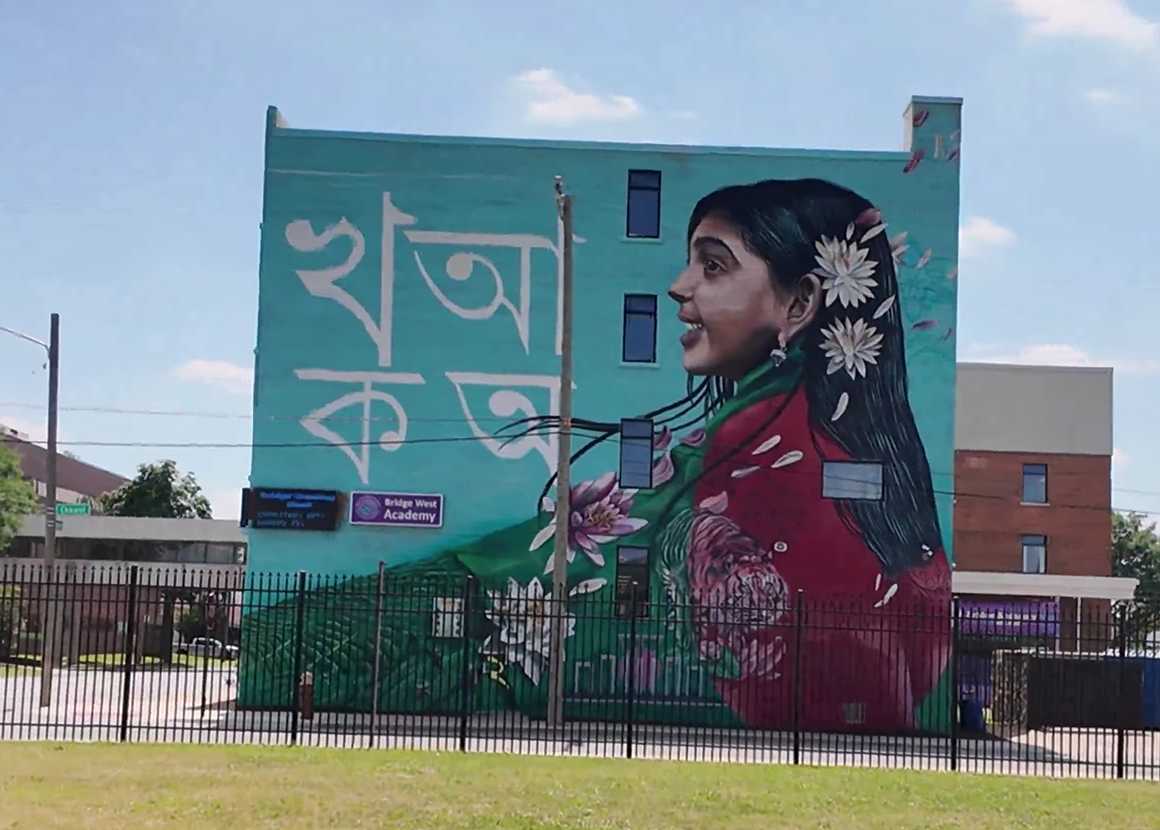
Bengali-language mural at Hamtramck, Michigan

== History ==
The descent of proto-Gauda-Bangla, the ancestor of the modern Bengali language, from the proto-Gauda-Kamarupa line of the proto-Magadhan (Magadhi Prakrit)

=== Ancient ===
With the advent of the Indo-Aryans in the 3rd century BCE, Bengal was gradually being Sanskritised. The varieties of Prakrit spoken in Bengal region were generally referred to as "eastern Magadhi Prakrit", as coined by linguist Suniti Kumar Chatterji, as the Middle Indo-Aryan dialects were influential in the first millennium when Bengal was a part of the Greater Magadhan realm. Muhammad Shahidullah attempted to trace the origin of Bengali to Old Indo-Aryan through the Gaudi Prakrit; his findings were later supported by A. B. Keith and others.

The local varieties had no official status during the Gupta Empire, and with Bengal increasingly becoming a hub of Sanskrit literature for Hindu priests and Buddhist Acharyas, the vernacular of Bengal gained much influence from Sanskrit. Magadhi Prakrit was also spoken in modern-day Bihar and Assam, and this vernacular eventually evolved into Ardha Magadhi. Ardha Magadhi began to give way to what is known as Apabhraṃśa, by the end of the first millennium. The Bengali language evolved as a distinct language over the course of time.

=== Early ===
A Sanskrit-Chinese dictionary compiled by the Chinese poet Li-Yen in 782 CE shows the presence of Bengali. A research document Classical Bangla published in 2024 by the Kolkata-based institute "Institute of Language Studies and Research" (ILSR), mentions the presence of 51 Bengali words in the dictionary. The lexicon strongly supports the existence of Old Bengali in the 8th century or earlier.

Though some archaeologists claim that some 10th-century texts were in Bengali, it is not certain whether they represent a differentiated language or whether they represent a stage when Eastern Indo-Aryan languages were differentiating. The local Apabhraṃśa of the eastern subcontinent, Purbi Apabhraṃśa or Abahatta (lit. 'meaningless sounds'), eventually evolved into regional dialects, which in turn formed three groups, the Bengali–Assamese languages, the Bihari languages, and the Odia language.

The language was not static: different varieties coexisted and authors often wrote in multiple dialects in this period. For example, Ardhamagadhi is believed to have evolved into Abahatta around the 6th century, which competed with the ancestor of Bengali for some time. The ancestor of Bengali was the language of the Pala Empire and the Sena dynasty.

=== Medieval ===
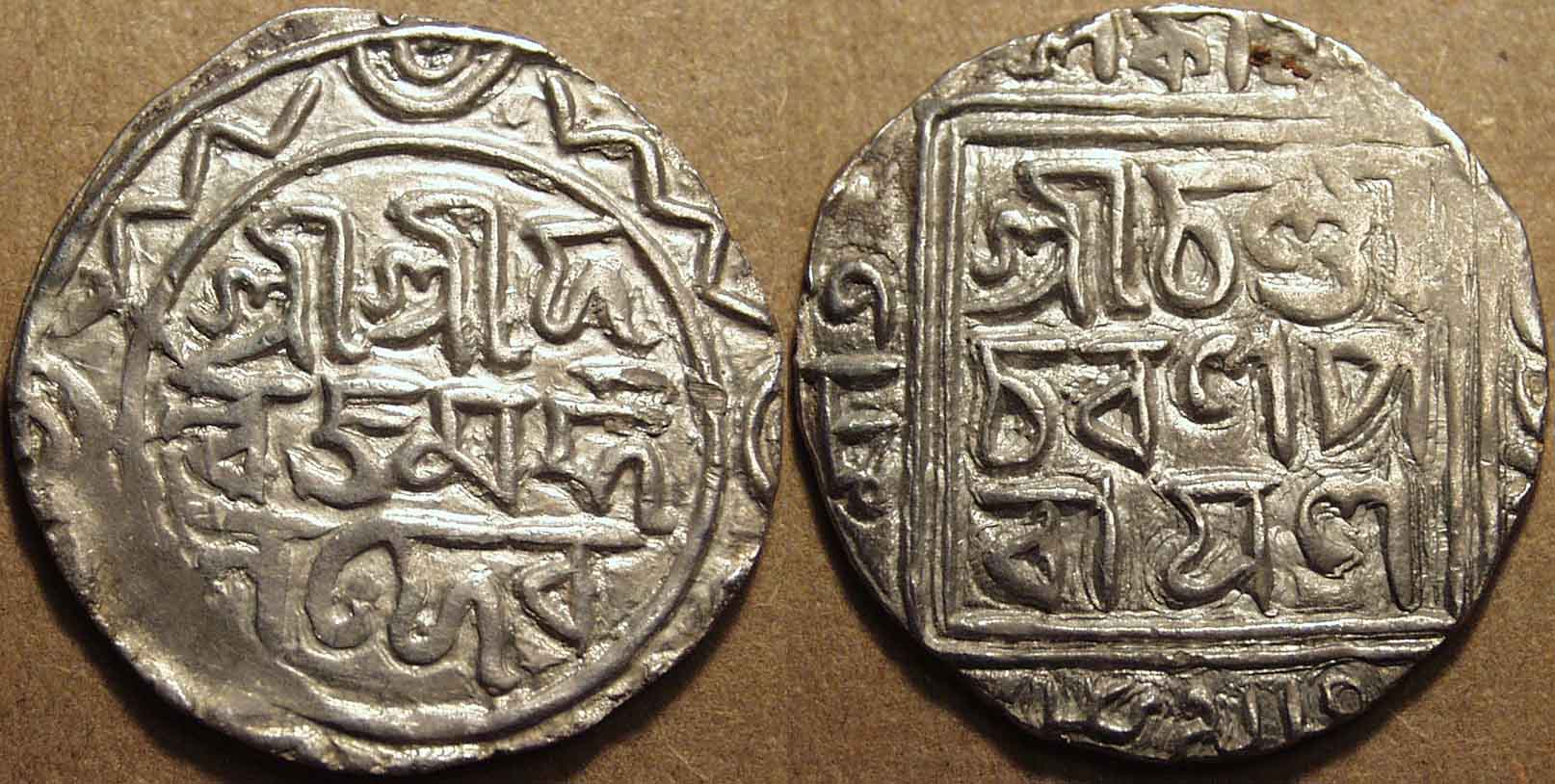
Silver coin of Maharaj Gaudeshwar Danujmardandev of Deva dynasty, c. 1417

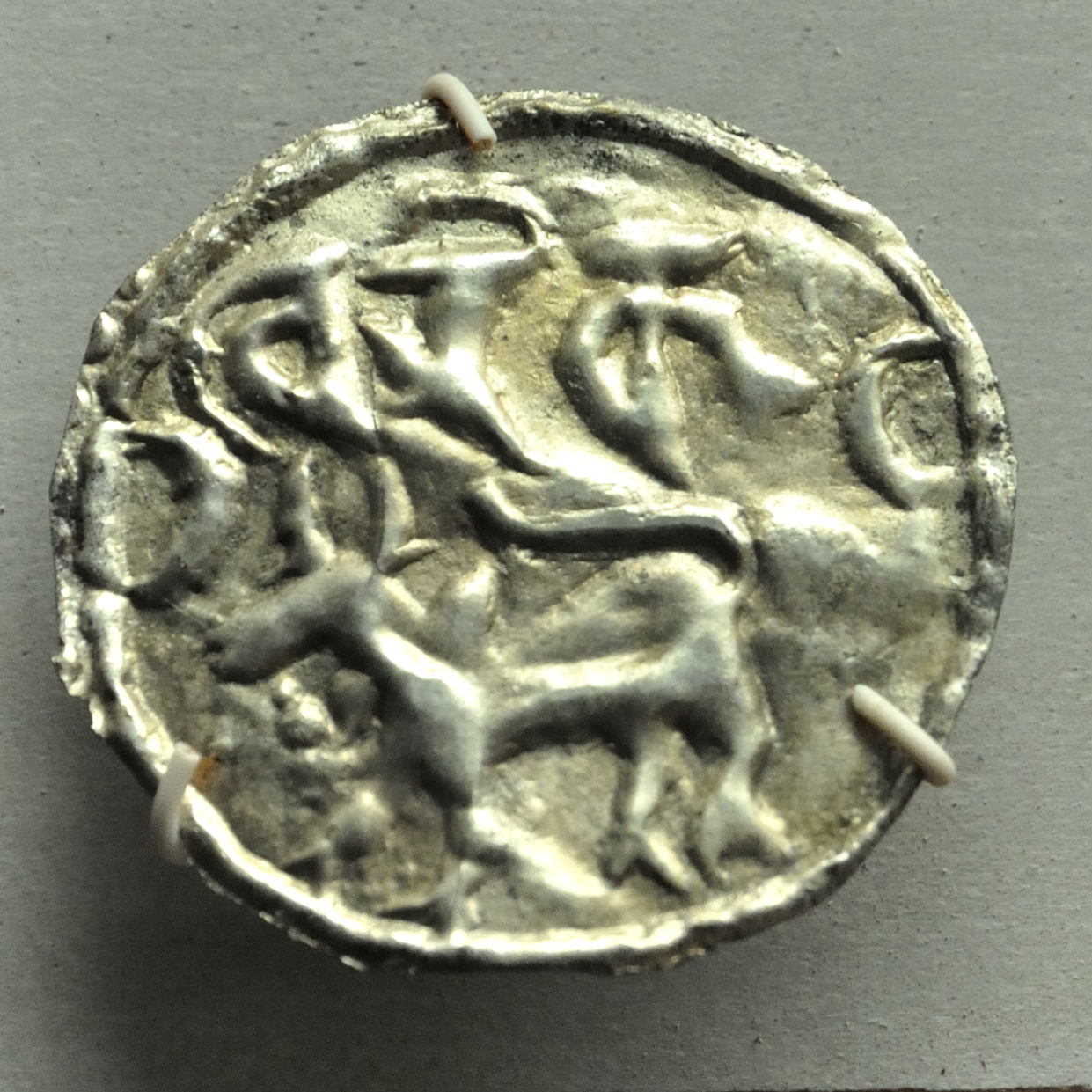
Silver coin with proto-Bengali script, Harikela Kingdom, c. 9th–13th century

During the medieval period, Middle Bengali was characterised by the elision of the word-final অ ô and the spread of compound verbs, which originated from the Sanskrit schwa. Slowly, the word-final ô disappeared from many words influenced by the Arabic, Persian, and Turkic languages. The arrival of merchants and traders from the Middle East and Turkestan into the Buddhist-ruling Pala Empire, from as early as the 7th century, gave birth to Islamic influence in the region. By the beginning of 15th century or even earlier, a literary standard form of Middle Bengali grew up which was rapidly used across all of Bengal region as the standard dialect of Middle Bengali literature. It was considered a high dialect in Bengal, which had utilised forms from the various Middle Bengali dialects.

In the 13th century, subsequent Arab Muslim and Turco-Persian expeditions to Bengal heavily influenced the local vernacular by settling among the native population. Bengali absorbed Arabic and Persian influences in its vocabulary and dialect, including the development of Dobhashi.

Bengali acquired prominence, over Persian, in the court of the Sultans of Bengal with the ascent of Jalaluddin Muhammad Shah. Subsequent Muslim rulers actively promoted the literary development of Bengali, allowing it to become the most spoken vernacular language in the Sultanate. Bengali adopted many words from Arabic and Persian, which was a manifestation of Islamic culture on the language. Major texts of Middle Bengali (1400–1800) include Yusuf-Zulekha by Shah Muhammad Sagir and Srikrishna Kirtana by the Chandidas poets. Court support for Bengali culture and language waned when the Mughal Empire conquered Bengal in the late 16th and early 17th century.

=== Modern ===
The standard literary form of Modern Bengali was developed during the 19th and early 20th centuries based on the west-central dialect spoken in Shantipur region of the Nadia district. Modern Bengali shows a high degree of diglossia, with the literary and standard form differing greatly from the colloquial speech of the regions that identify with the language. Modern Bengali vocabulary is based on words inherited from Magadhi Prakrit and Pali, along with tatsamas and reborrowings from Sanskrit and borrowings from Persian, Arabic, Austroasiatic languages and other languages with which it has historically been in contact.

In the 19th and 20th centuries, there were two standard forms of written Bengali:

- চলিতভাষা Chôlitôbhasha, a colloquial form of Bengali using simplified inflections.
- সাধুভাষা Sadhubhasha, a formal and genteel form of Bengali. Sadhu Bangla is considered a high dialect of Modern Bengali in which all the Old Bengali characteristics are preserved.

In 1948, the government of Pakistan tried to impose Urdu as the sole state language in Pakistan, giving rise to the Bengali language movement. This was a popular ethnolinguistic movement in the former East Bengal (today Bangladesh), which arose as a result of the strong linguistic consciousness of the Bengalis and their desire to promote and protect spoken and written Bengali's recognition as a state language of the then Dominion of Pakistan. On 21 February 1952, five students and political activists were killed during protests near the campus of the University of Dhaka; they were the first ever martyrs to die for their right to speak their mother tongue. In 1956, Bengali was made a state language of Pakistan. 21 February has since been observed as Language Movement Day in Bangladesh and has also been commemorated as International Mother Language Day by UNESCO every year since 2000.

In 2010, the parliament of Bangladesh and the legislative assembly of West Bengal proposed that Bengali be made an official UN language. As of January 2023, no further action has been yet taken on this matter. However, in 2022, the UN did adopt Bangla as an unofficial language, after a resolution tabled by India.

In 2024, the government of India conferred Bengali with the status of classical language.

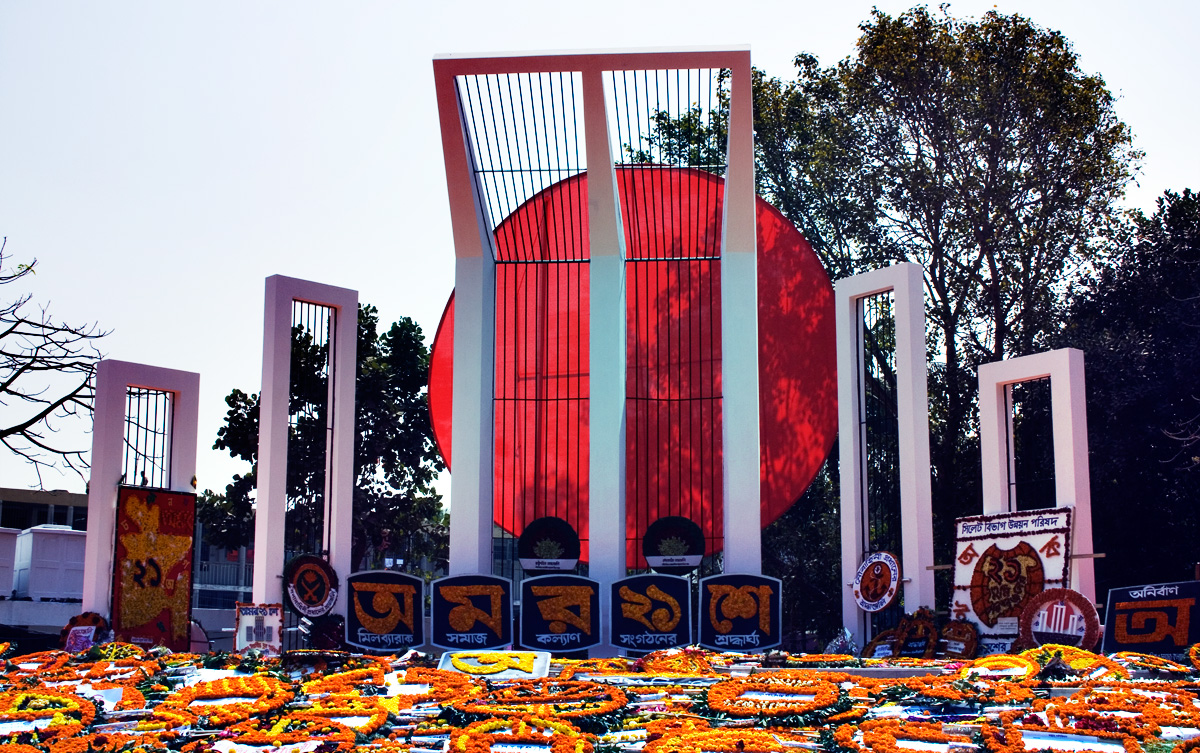
The Central Shaheed Minar in Dhaka, Bangladesh

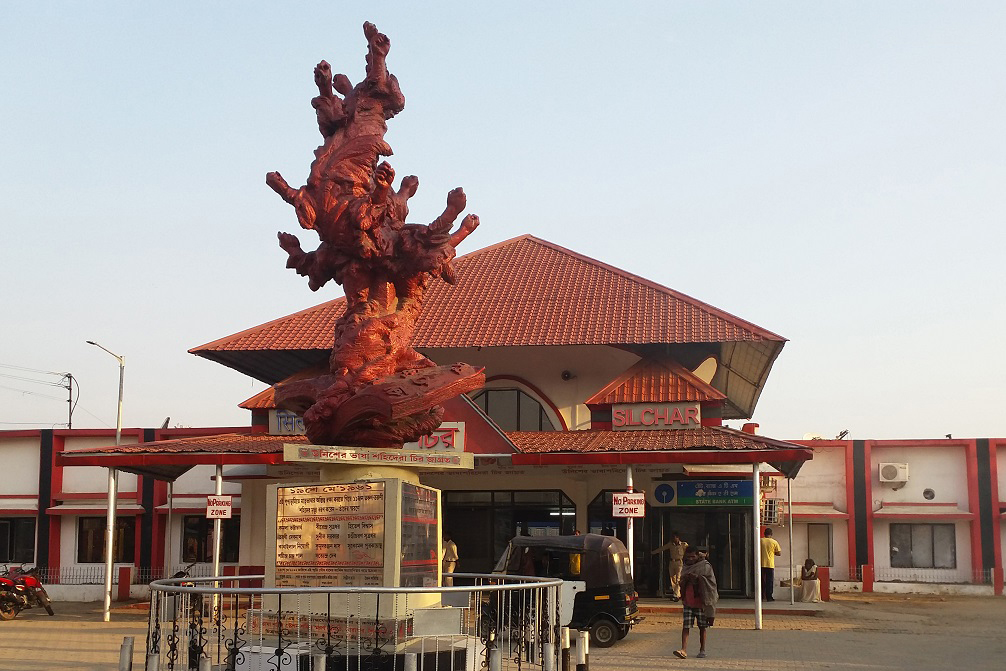
Language Martyr's Memorial at Silchar Railway Station in Assam, India

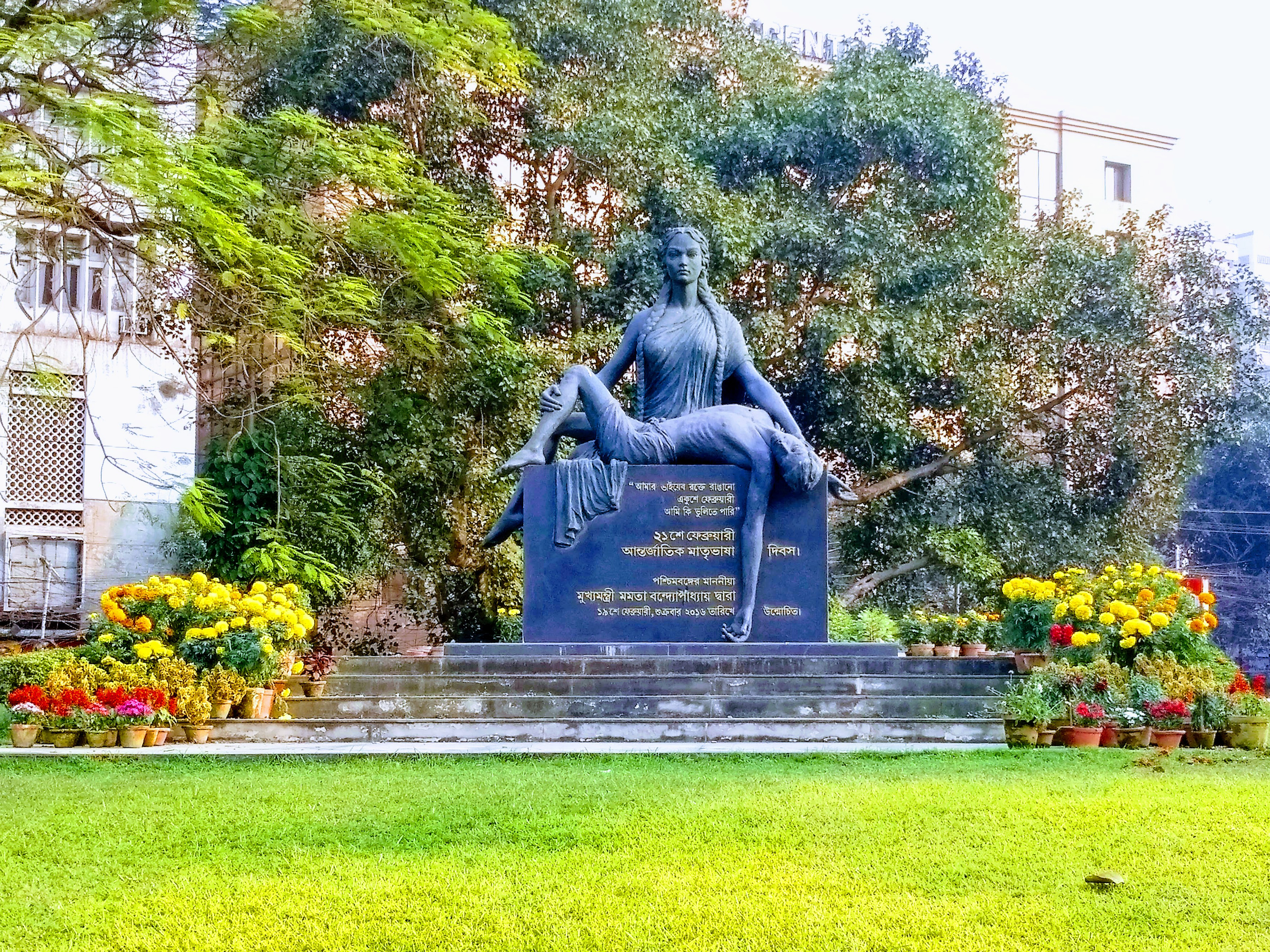
Mother Language Day Monument in Kolkata, West Bengal

== Geographical distribution ==
Approximate distribution of native Bengali speakers (assuming a rounded total of 280–290 million) worldwide (Note: The number of Bangladeshis worldwide exceeds 190 million. Nearly 15 million Bangladeshis live outside Bangladesh and are not included during national census counts. Considering the total number of Bengalis to be around 270–280 million, Bangladeshis constitute approximately 67–70% of the global Bengali population.)
1. Bangladesh or Bangladeshi origin (68.0%)
2. India or Indian origin (32.0%)

Geographical distribution of the Bengali language in the world Main language Regional language Overseas population of more than a million Overseas population of more than 100 thousand Overseas population of more than 10 thousand Overseas population of more than a thousand

Besides the native region, it is also spoken by the Bengalis living in Tripura, southern Assam and the union territory of Andaman and Nicobar Islands. Bengali is also spoken in the neighbouring states of Odisha, Bihar, and Jharkhand, and sizeable minorities of Bengali speakers reside in Indian cities outside Bengal, including Delhi, Mumbai, Thane, Varanasi, and Vrindavan. There are also significant Bengali-speaking communities in the Middle East, the United States, Singapore, Malaysia, Australia, Canada, the United Kingdom, and Italy.

=== Official status ===
The 3rd article of the Constitution of Bangladesh states Bengali to be the sole official language of Bangladesh. The Bengali Language Implementation Act, 1987, made it mandatory to use Bengali in all records and correspondences, laws, proceedings of court and other legal actions in all courts, government or semi-government offices, and autonomous institutions in Bangladesh. It is also the de facto national language of the country.

In India, Bengali is one of the 22 official languages. It is the official language of the Indian states of West Bengal, Tripura and in Barak Valley of Assam. Bengali has been a second official language of the Indian state of Jharkhand since September 2011.

In Pakistan, Bengali is a recognised secondary language in the city of Karachi mainly spoken by stranded Bengalis of Pakistan. The Department of Bengali in the University of Karachi (established by East Pakistani politicians before Independence of Bangladesh) also offers regular programs of studies at the Bachelors and at the Masters levels for Bengali Literature.

The national anthems of both Bangladesh (Amar Sonar Bangla) and India (Jana Gana Mana) were written in Bengali by the Bengali Nobel laureate Rabindranath Tagore. Notuner Gaan known as "Chol Chol Chol" is Bangladesh's national march, written by The National Poet Kazi Nazrul Islam in Bengali in 1928. It was adopted as the national marching song by the Bangladeshi government in 1972. Additionally, the first two verses of Vande Mataram, a patriotic song written in Bengali by Bankim Chandra Chatterjee, was adopted as the "national song" of India in both the colonial period and later in 1950 in independent India. Furthermore, it is believed by many that the national anthem of Sri Lanka (Sri Lanka Matha) was inspired by a Bengali poem written by Rabindranath Tagore, while some even believe the anthem was originally written in Bengali and then translated into Sinhala.

In 2009, elected representatives in both Bangladesh and West Bengal called for Bengali to be made an official language of the United Nations.

== Dialects ==
Regional varieties in spoken Bengali constitute a dialect continuum. Linguists Suniti Kumar Chatterji and Sukumar Sen grouped the dialects of Bengali language into six large clusters: Rarhi, Vangiya, Rajbanshi/Kamarupi, Manbhumi/Jharkhandi, Sundarbani and Varendri; but many alternative grouping schemes have also been proposed. The West-Central dialects (Rarhi or Nadia-Kushtia dialect) form the basis of modern standard colloquial Bengali. In the dialects prevalent in much of eastern and south-eastern Bangladesh (Barisal, Chittagong, Dhaka and Sylhet Divisions of Bangladesh), many of the stops and affricates heard in West Bengal and western Bangladesh are pronounced as fricatives. Western alveolo-palatal affricates চ [tʃɔ], ছ [tʃʰɔ~tʃɔ], জ [dʒɔ] correspond to eastern চ [tsɔ~sɔ], ছ [sɔ], জ [dzɔ~zɔ].

The potential influence of Tibeto-Burman languages on the phonology of Eastern Bengali is used to explain the lack of nasalised vowels and an alveolar articulation of what are categorised as the "cerebral" consonants (as opposed to the postalveolar articulation of western Bengal). Some varieties of Bengali, particularly Sylheti, Chittagonian, Noakhali and Chakma, have contrastive tone; differences in the pitch of the speaker's voice can distinguish words. Kharia Thar and Mal Paharia are closely related to Western Bengali dialects, but are typically classified as separate languages. Similarly, Hajong is considered a separate language, although it shares similarities to Northern Bengali dialects.

During the standardisation of Modern Bengali in the 19th century and early 20th century, the cultural centre of Bengal was in Kolkata, a city founded by the British. What is accepted as the standard form today in both West Bengal and Bangladesh is based on the West-Central dialect of Nadia and Kushtia District. There are cases where speakers of Standard Bengali in West Bengal will use a different word from a speaker of Standard Bengali in Bangladesh, even though both words are of native Bengali descent. For example, the word for 'salt' is লবণ lôbôṇ in the east, which corresponds to নুন nun in the west.

A map of Bengal (and some districts of Assam and Jharkhand) which shows the varieties of the Bengali language Bangali (Vanga) Manbhumi Varendri Rarhi Sundarbani Rajbanshi* Chittagonian* Sylheti* (those marked varieties with an asterisk * are sometimes considered dialects and sometimes as separate languages)

Bengali exhibits diglossia, though some scholars have proposed triglossia or even n-glossia or heteroglossia between the written and spoken forms of the language. Two styles of writing have emerged, involving somewhat different vocabularies and syntax:

1. Sadhu bhasha (সাধু ভাষা "upright language") was the written language, with longer verb inflections and more of a Pali and Sanskrit-derived Tatsama vocabulary. Songs such as India's national anthem Jana Gana Mana (by Rabindranath Tagore) were composed in this style. Its use in modern writing however is uncommon, restricted to some official signs and documents as well as for achieving particular literary effects.
2. Chôlito bhasha (চলিত ভাষা "running language"), known by linguists as Standard Colloquial Bengali, is a written Bengali style exhibiting a preponderance of colloquial idiom and shortened verb forms and is the standard for written Bengali now. This form came into vogue towards the turn of the 19th century, promoted by the writings of Peary Chand Mitra (Alaler Gharer Dulal, 1857), Pramatha Chaudhuri (Sabujpatra, 1914) and in the later writings of Rabindranath Tagore. It is modelled on the dialect spoken in the Shantipur and Shilaidaha region in Nadia and Kushtia Districts respectively. This form of Bengali is often referred to as the "Kushtia standard"(Bangladesh), "Nadia standard" (West Bengal), "West-Central dialect", "Shantipuri Bangla" or "Shilaidahi Bangla".

While most writing is in Standard Colloquial Bengali (SCB), spoken dialects exhibit a greater variety. People in southeastern West Bengal, including Kolkata, speak in SCB. Other dialects, with minor variations from Standard Colloquial, are used in other parts of West Bengal and western Bangladesh, such as the Midnapore dialect, characterised by some unique words and constructions. However, a majority in Bangladesh speaks dialects notably different from SCB. Some dialects, particularly those of the Chittagong region, bear only a superficial resemblance to SCB. The dialect in the Chittagong region is least widely understood by the general body of Bengalis. The majority of Bengalis are able to communicate in more than one variety – often, speakers are fluent in Cholitobhasha (SCB) and one or more regional dialects.

Even in SCB, the vocabulary may differ according to the speaker's religion: Muslims are more likely to use words of Persian and Arabic origin, along with more words naturally derived from Sanskrit (tadbhava), whereas Hindus are more likely to use tatsama (words directly borrowed from Sanskrit).. For example:

Predominantly Hindu usage	Origin	Predominantly Muslim usage	Origin	Translation
নমস্কার nômôskār	Directly borrowed from Sanskrit namaskāra	আসসালামু আলাইকুম āssālāmu ālāikum	Directly from Arabic as-salāmu ʿalaykum	hello
নিমন্ত্রণ nimôntrôṇ	Directly borrowed from Sanskrit nimantraṇa as opposed to the native Bengali nemôntônnô	দাওয়াত dāowāt	Borrowed from Arabic daʿwah via Persian	invitation
জল jôl	Native or borrowed, in either case ultimately from Sanskrit jala	পানি pāni	Native, compare with Sanskrit pānīya	water
স্নান snān	Directly borrowed from Sanskrit snāna	গোসল gosol	Borrowed from Arabic ghuṣl via Persian	bath
দিদি didi	Native, from Sanskrit devī	আপা āpā	From Turkic languages	sister / elder sister
দাদা dādā	Native, from Sanskrit dāyāda	ভাইয়া bhāiyā	Native, from Sanskrit bhrātā	brother / elder brother
মাসি māsi	Native, from Sanskrit mātṛṣvasā	খালা khālā	Directly borrowed from Arabic khālah	maternal aunt
পিসি pisi	Native, from Sanskrit pitṛṣvasā	ফুফু phuphu	Native, from Prakrit phupphī	paternal aunt
কাকা kākā	From Persian or Dravidian kākā	চাচা chāchā	From Prakrit cācca	paternal uncle
দিদিমা didimā	From Sanskrit Devī and Mātā	নানী nānī	From Hindi नानी (nānī)	maternal grandmother
ঠাকুরমা ṭhākuramā	From Sanskrit Ṭhākura and Mātā	দাদী dādī	From Hindi दादी (dādī)	paternal grandmother
প্রার্থনা prārthonā	Directly borrowed from Sanskrit prārthanā	দোয়া doyā or নামাজ nāmāj	Borrowed from Arabic duʿāʾ	prayer
আশীর্বাদ āśīrbād	From Sanskrit Āśīrvāda	দোয়া doyā	From Arabic duʿāʾ	blessings
লঙ্কা lônkā	Native, named after Lanka	মরিচ morich	Directly borrowed from Sanskrit marica	chilli

== Phonology ==
The phonemic inventory of standard Bengali consists of 29 consonants and 7 vowels, as well as 7 nasalised vowels. The inventory is set out below in the International Phonetic Alphabet.

Vowels
	Front	Back
Close	i ĩ	u ũ
Close-mid	e ẽ	o õ
Open-mid	æ æ̃	ɔ ɔ̃
Open	a ã	

Consonants
			Labial	Dental/ Alveolar	Retroflex	Palatal (-alveolar)	Velar	Glottal
Nasal			m	n			ŋ	
Plosive/ affricate	voiceless	unaspirated	p	t̪	ʈ	tʃ	k	
Plosive/ affricate	voiceless	aspirated	pʰ	t̪ʰ	ʈʰ	tʃʰ	kʰ	
Plosive/ affricate	voiced	unaspirated	b	d̪	ɖ	dʒ	ɡ	
Plosive/ affricate	voiced	aspirated	bʱ	d̪ʱ	ɖʱ	dʒʱ	ɡʱ	
Fricative		voiceless	(ɸ)	s		ʃ		(h)
Fricative		voiced	(β)	(z)				ɦ
Approximant			(w)	l		(j)		
Rhotic		unaspirated		r	ɽ			
Rhotic		aspirated			(ɽʱ)			

Bengali is known for its wide variety of diphthongs, combinations of vowels occurring within the same syllable. Two of these, /oi̯/ and /ou̯/, are the only ones with representation in script, as ঐ and ঔ respectively. /e̯ i̯ o̯ u̯/ may all form the glide part of a diphthong. The total number of diphthongs is not established, with bounds at 17 and 31. An incomplete chart is given by Sarkar (1985) of the following:

	e̯	i̯	o̯	u̯
a	ae̯	ai̯	ao̯	au̯
æ	æe̯		æo̯	
e		ei̯		eu̯
i		ii̯		iu̯
o	oe̯	oi̯	oo̯	ou̯
u		ui̯		

=== Stress ===
In standard Bengali, stress is predominantly initial. Bengali words are virtually all trochaic; the primary stress falls on the initial syllable of the word, while secondary stress often falls on all odd-numbered syllables thereafter, giving strings such as in সহযোগিতা shô-hô-jo-gi-ta "cooperation", where the boldface represents primary and secondary stress.

=== Consonant clusters ===
Native Bengali words do not allow initial consonant clusters; the maximum syllabic structure is CVC (i.e., one vowel flanked by a consonant on each side). Many speakers of Bengali restrict their phonology to this pattern, even when using Sanskrit or English borrowings, such as গেরাম geram (CV.CVC) for গ্রাম gram (CCVC) "village" or ইস্কুল iskul (VC.CVC) for স্কুল skul (CCVC) "school".

== Writing system ==
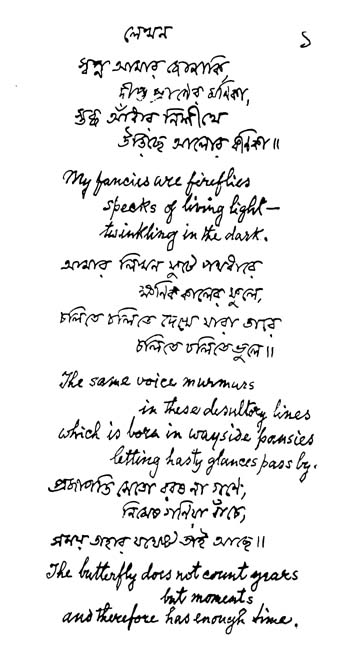
An example of handwritten Bengali. Part of a poem written in Bengali (and with its English translation below each Bengali paragraph) by Nobel laureate Rabindranath Tagore in 1926 in Hungary.

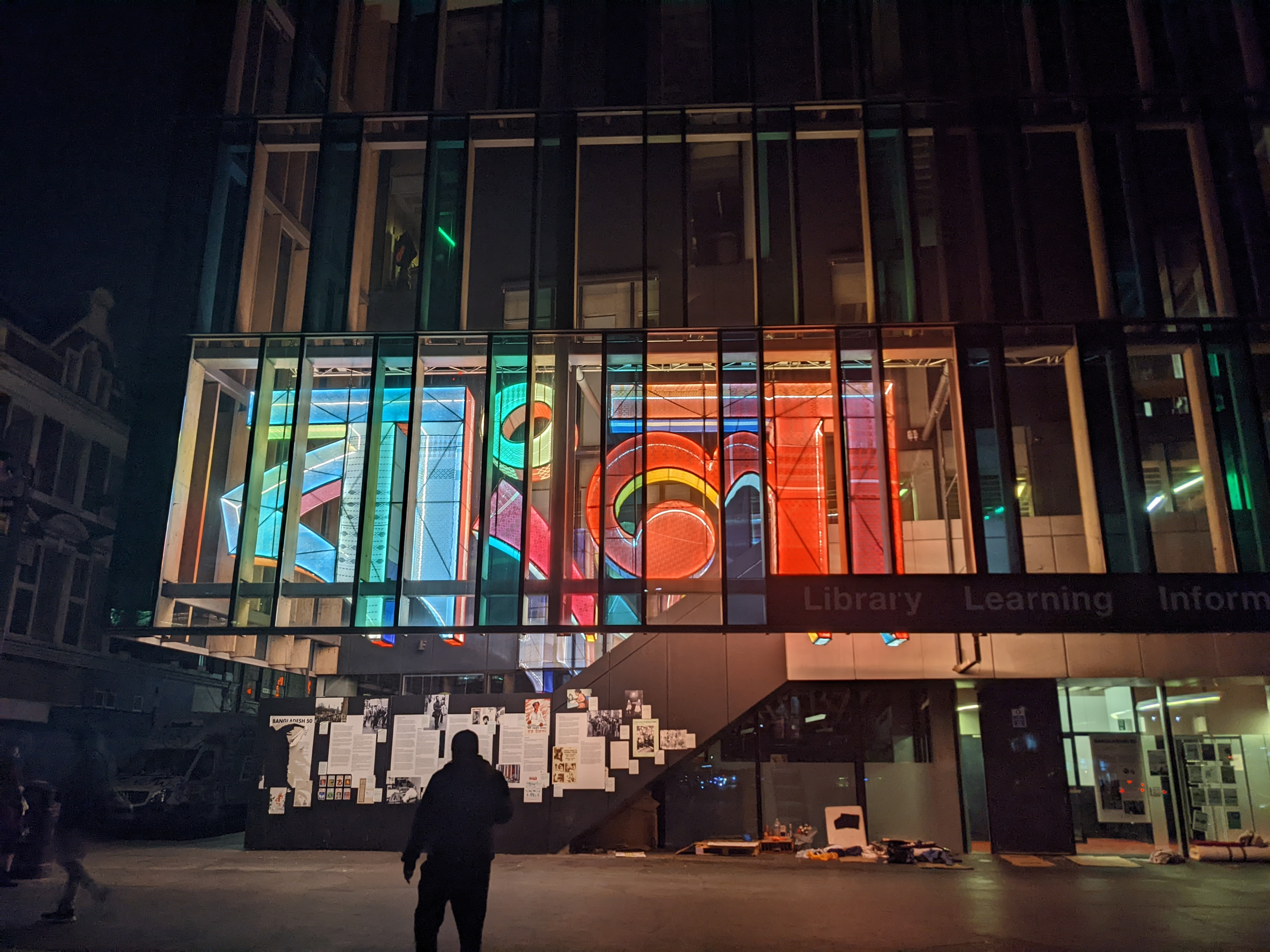
The Library of Whitechapel in East London with the word "বাংলা" illuminated on its front

The Bengali-Assamese script is an abugida, a script with letters for consonants, with diacritics for vowels, and in which an inherent vowel (অ ô) is assumed for consonants if no vowel is marked. The Bengali alphabet is used throughout Bangladesh and eastern India (Assam, West Bengal, Tripura). The Bengali alphabet is believed to have evolved from a modified Brahmic script around 1000 CE (or 10th–11th century). It is a cursive script with eleven graphemes or signs denoting nine vowels and two diphthongs, and thirty-nine graphemes representing consonants and other modifiers. There are no distinct upper and lower case letter forms. The letters run from left to right and spaces are used to separate orthographic words. Bengali script has a distinctive horizontal line running along the tops of the graphemes that links them together called মাত্রা matra.

Since the Bengali script is an abugida, its consonant graphemes usually do not represent phonetic segments, but carry an "inherent" vowel and thus are syllabic in nature. The inherent vowel is usually a back vowel, either [ɔ] as in মত [mɔt] "opinion" or [o], as in মন [mon] "mind", with variants like the more open [ɒ]. To emphatically represent a consonant sound without any inherent vowel attached to it, a special diacritic, called the hôsôntô (্), may be added below the basic consonant grapheme (as in ম্ [m]). This diacritic, however, is not common and is chiefly employed as a guide to pronunciation. The abugida nature of Bengali consonant graphemes is not consistent, however. Often, syllable-final consonant graphemes, though not marked by a hôsôntô, may carry no inherent vowel sound (as in the final ন in মন [mon] or the medial ম in গামলা [ɡamla]).

A consonant sound followed by some vowel sound other than the inherent [ɔ] is orthographically realised by using a variety of vowel allographs above, below, before, after, or around the consonant sign, thus forming the ubiquitous consonant-vowel typographic ligatures. These allographs, called কার kar, are diacritical vowel forms and cannot stand on their own. For example, the graph মি [mi] represents the consonant [m] followed by the vowel [i], where [i] is represented as the diacritical allograph ি (called ই-কার i-kar) and is placed before the default consonant sign. Similarly, the graphs মা [ma], মী [mi], মু [mu], মূ [mu], মৃ [mri], মে [me~mɛ], মৈ [moj], মো [mo] and মৌ [mow] represent the same consonant ম combined with seven other vowels and two diphthongs. In these consonant-vowel ligatures, the so-called "inherent" vowel [ɔ] is first expunged from the consonant before adding the vowel, but this intermediate expulsion of the inherent vowel is not indicated in any visual manner on the basic consonant sign ম [mɔ].

The vowel graphemes in Bengali can take two forms: the independent form found in the basic inventory of the script and the dependent, abridged, allograph form (as discussed above). To represent a vowel in isolation from any preceding or following consonant, the independent form of the vowel is used. For example, in মই [moj] "ladder" and in ইলিশ [iliʃ] "Hilsa fish", the independent form of the vowel ই is used (cf. the dependent formি). A vowel at the beginning of a word is always realised using its independent form.

In addition to the inherent-vowel-suppressing hôsôntô, three more diacritics are commonly used in Bengali. These are the superposed chôndrôbindu (ঁ), denoting a suprasegmental for nasalisation of vowels (as in চাঁদ [tʃãd] "moon"), the postposed ônusbar (ং) indicating the velar nasal [ŋ] (as in বাংলা [baŋla] "Bengali") and the postposed bisôrgô (ঃ) indicating the voiceless glottal fricative [h] (as in উঃ! [uh] "ouch!") or the gemination of the following consonant (as in দুঃখ [dukʰːɔ] "sorrow"). Like other Indic scripts, the Bengali script has Schwa deletion and does not always mark when the inherent vowel is deleted — typically at the end of words.

The Bengali consonant clusters (যুক্তব্যঞ্জন juktôbênjôn) are usually realised as ligatures, where the consonant which comes first is put on top of or to the left of the one that immediately follows. In these ligatures, the shapes of the constituent consonant signs are often contracted and sometimes even distorted beyond recognition. As in, ক্ষ (ক+ষ) or হ্ম (হ+ম) In the Bengali writing system, there are nearly 285 such ligatures denoting consonant clusters. Although there exist a few visual formulas to construct some of these ligatures, many of them have to be learned by rote. Recently, in a bid to lessen this burden on young learners, efforts have been made by educational institutions in the two main Bengali-speaking regions (West Bengal and Bangladesh) to address the opaque nature of many consonant clusters, and as a result, modern Bengali textbooks are beginning to contain more and more "transparent" graphical forms of consonant clusters, in which the constituent consonants of a cluster are readily apparent from the graphical form. However, since this change is not as widespread and is not being followed as uniformly in the rest of the Bengali printed literature, today's Bengali-learning children will possibly have to learn to recognise both the new "transparent" and the old "opaque" forms, which ultimately amounts to an increase in learning burden.

Bengali punctuation marks, apart from the downstroke । daṛi – the Bengali equivalent of a full stop – have been adopted from Western scripts and their usage is similar.

Unlike in Western scripts (Latin, Cyrillic, etc.) where the letter forms stand on an invisible baseline, the Bengali letter-forms instead hang from a visible horizontal left-to-right headstroke called মাত্রা matra. The presence and absence of this matra can be important. For example, the letter ত tô and the numeral ৩ "3" are distinguishable only by the presence or absence of the matra, as is the case between the consonant cluster ত্র trô and the independent vowel এ e, also the letter হ hô and Bengali Ôbogroho ঽ (~ô) and letter ও o and consonant cluster ত্ত ttô. The letter-forms also employ the concepts of letter-width and letter-height (the vertical space between the visible matra and an invisible baseline).

There is yet to be a uniform standard collating sequence (sorting order of graphemes to be used in dictionaries, indices, computer sorting programs, etc.) of Bengali graphemes. Experts in both Bangladesh and India are currently working towards a common solution for this problem.

=== Alternative and historic scripts ===
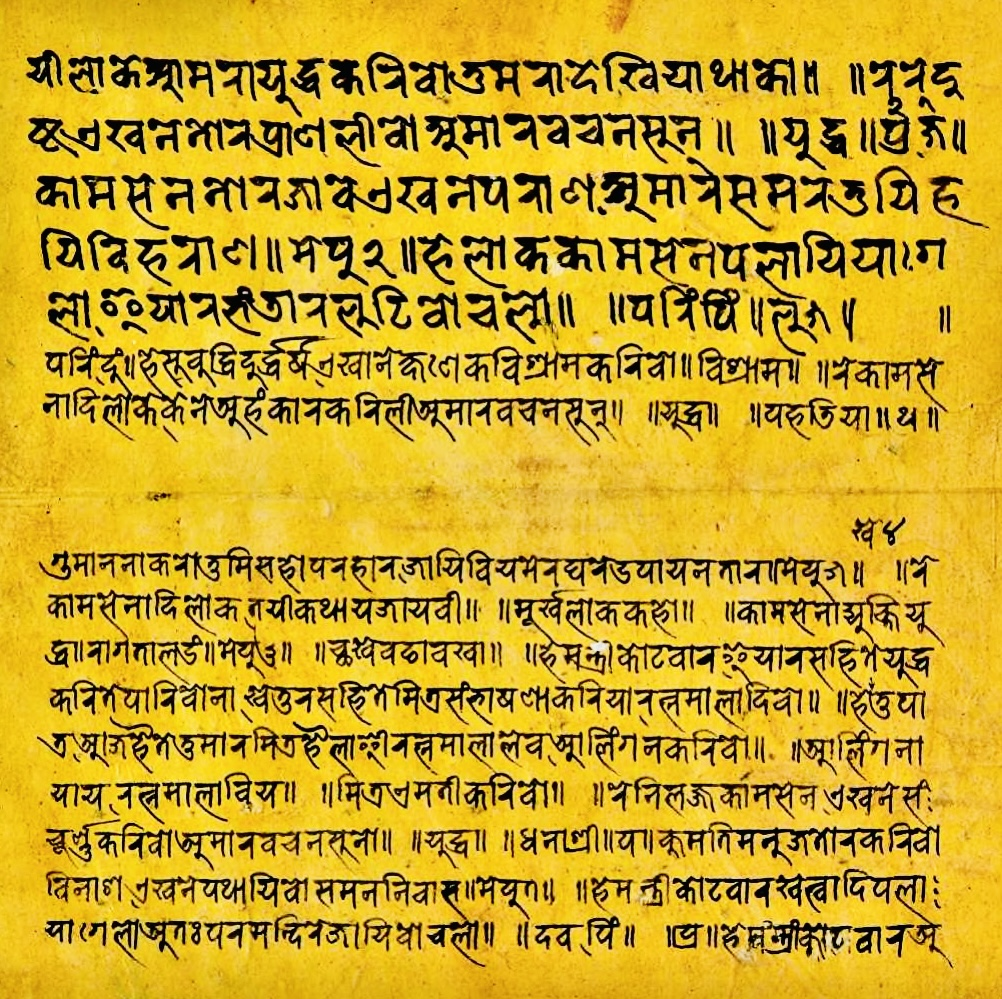
A 1729 CE manuscript of Gopīcanda Nāṭaka, a Bengali play written in the Newar script

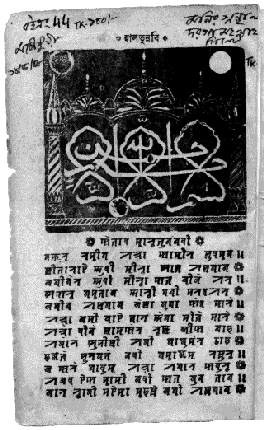
An 1855 Dobhashi manuscript of Halat-un-Nabi written by Sadeq Ali using the Sylheti Nagri script

Throughout history, there have been instances of the Bengali language being written in different scripts, though these employments were never popular on a large scale and were communally limited. Owing to Bengal's geographic location, Bengali areas bordering non-Bengali regions have been influenced by each other. Small numbers of people in Midnapore, which borders Odisha, have used the Odia script to write in Bengali. In the border areas between West Bengal and Bihar, some Bengali communities historically wrote Bengali in Devanagari, Kaithi and Tirhuta.

In the Kingdom of Bhaktapur, the Newar script was used to write Bengali plays during the 17th and 18th centuries. In Sylhet and Bankura, modified versions of the Kaithi script had some historical prominence, mainly among Muslim communities. The variant in Sylhet was identical to the Baitali Kaithi script of Hindustani with the exception of Sylhet Nagri possessing matra. Sylhet Nagri was standardised for printing in c. 1869.

Up until the 19th century, numerous variations of the Arabic script had been used across Bengal from Chittagong in the east (see Dobhashi) to Meherpur in the west. The 14th-century court scholar of Bengal, Nur Qutb Alam, composed Bengali poetry using the Persian alphabet. After the Partition of India in the 20th century, the Pakistani government attempted to institute the Perso-Arabic script as the standard for Bengali in East Pakistan; this was met with resistance and contributed to the Bengali language movement.

In the 16th century, Portuguese missionaries began a tradition of using the Roman alphabet to transcribe the Bengali language. Though the Portuguese standard did not receive much growth, a few Roman Bengali works relating to Christianity and Bengali grammar were printed as far as Lisbon in 1743. The Portuguese were followed by the English and French respectively, whose works were mostly related to Bengali grammar and transliteration. The first version of the Aesop's Fables in Bengali was printed using Roman letters based on English phonology by the Scottish linguist John Gilchrist. Consecutive attempts to establish a Roman Bengali have continued across every century since these times, and have been supported by the likes of Suniti Kumar Chatterji, Muhammad Qudrat-i-Khuda, and Muhammad Enamul Haq. The Digital Revolution has also played a part in the adoption of the English alphabet to write Bengali, with certain social media influencers publishing entire novels in Roman Bengali.

=== Orthographic depth ===
The Bengali script in general has a comparatively shallow orthography when compared to the Latin script used for English and French, i.e., in many cases there is a one-to-one correspondence between the sounds (phonemes) and the letters (graphemes) of Bengali. But grapheme-phoneme inconsistencies do occur in many cases. In fact, Bengali-Assamese script has the deepest orthography among the Indian scripts. In general, the Bengali-Assamese script is fairly transparent for grapheme-to-phoneme conversion, i.e., it is easier to predict the pronunciation from spelling of the words, though there are many cases where pronunciation is different from what is written. But the script is fairly opaque for phoneme-to-grapheme conversion, i.e., it is often quite difficult to predict the spelling from the pronunciation of the words. In general, the script is fairly transparent for "tadbhav" words (native Bengali words). But it is quite opaque for "tatsam" words (words derived from Sanskrit), for both, phoneme-to-grapheme as well as grapheme-to-phoneme conversions.

One kind of inconsistency is due to the presence of several letters in the script for the same sound. In spite of some modifications in the 19th century, the Bengali spelling system continues to be based on the one used for Sanskrit, and thus does not take into account some sound mergers that have occurred in the spoken language. For example, there are three letters (শ, ষ, and স) for the voiceless postalveolar fricative [ʃ], although the letter স retains the voiceless alveolar sibilant [s] sound when used in certain consonant conjuncts as in স্খলন [skʰɔlon] "fall", স্পন্দন [spɔndon] "beat", etc. The letter ষ also, sometimes, retains the voiceless retroflex sibilant [ʂ] sound when used in certain consonant conjuncts as in কষ্ট [kɔʂʈo] "suffering", গোষ্ঠী [ɡoʂʈʰi] "clan", etc. Similarly, there are two letters (জ and য) for the voiced postalveolar affricate [dʒ]. Moreover, what was once pronounced and written as a retroflex nasal ণ [ɳ] is now pronounced as a dental [n] when in conversation (the difference is heard when reading) (unless conjoined with another retroflex consonant such as ট, ঠ, ড and ঢ), although the spelling does not reflect this change. The near-open front unrounded vowel [æ] is orthographically realised by multiple means, as seen in the following examples: এত [æto] "so much", এ্যাকাডেমী [ækaɖemi] "academy", অ্যামিবা [æmiba] "amoeba", দেখা [dækʰa] "to see", ব্যস্ত [bæsto] "busy", ব্যাকরণ [bækorɔn] "grammar".

Another kind of inconsistency is concerned with the incomplete coverage of phonological information in the script. The inherent vowel attached to every consonant can be either [ɔ] or [o] depending on vowel harmony (স্বরসঙ্গতি) with the preceding or following vowel or on the context, but this phonological information is not captured by the script, creating ambiguity for the reader. Furthermore, the inherent vowel is often not pronounced at the end of a syllable, as in কম [kɔm] "less", but this omission is not generally reflected in the script, making it difficult for the new reader.

Many consonant clusters have different sounds than their constituent consonants. For example, the combination of the consonants ক্ [k] and ষ [ʂ] is graphically realised as ক্ষ and is pronounced [kkʰo] (as in রুক্ষ [rukkʰo] "coarse"), [kʰɔ] (as in ক্ষমতা [kʰɔmota] "capability") or even [kʰo] (as in ক্ষতি [kʰoti] "harm"), depending on the position of the cluster in a word. Another example is that there are around 7 or more graphemes to represent the sound [ʃ]. These are 'শ' as in শব্দ (śabda, pronounced as śôbdo "word"), 'ষ' as in ষড়যন্ত্র (ṣaṛayantra, pronounced as śoṛōjontrō "conspiracy"), 'স' as in সরকার (sarakāra, pronounced as śorkar "government"), 'শ্ব' as in শ্বশুর (written as śbaśura but pronounced with the ব b silent, i.e., as śōśur "father-in-law"), 'শ্ম' as in শ্মশান (written as śmaśāna but pronounced with the ম 'm' silent, i.e., as śośan "crematorium"), 'স্ব' as in স্বপ্ন (written as "sbapna" but pronounced with the ব 'b' silent, i.e., as śopnō "dream"), 'স্ম' as in স্মরণ (written as smaraṇa but pronounced with the ম 'm' silent, i.e., as śorōn "remembrance"), 'ষ্ম' as in গ্রীষ্ম (written as grīṣma but pronounced with the ম 'm' silent, i.e., as griśśō "summer") and so on. In most of the consonant clusters, only the first consonant is pronounced and rest of the consonants are silent. Examples are লক্ষ্মণ (written as lakṣmaṇa but pronounced as lokkhōn "Lakshman"), বিশ্বাস (written as biśbāsa but pronounced as biśśaś "belief"), বাধ্য (written as bādhya but pronounced as baddhō "obliged") and স্বাস্থ্য (written as sbāsthya but pronounced as śasthō "health"). Some consonant clusters have completely different pronunciation as compared to the constituent consonants. For example, 'হ্য' as in ঐতিহ্য (meaning "heritage") where hy is pronounced as jjh (written as aitihya but pronounced as ōitijjhō). The same হ্য is pronounced as 'hæ' as in হ্যাঁ (meaning "yes") (written as hyām̐ but pronounced as nasalised "hæ").

Another example of inconsistency in the script is that of words like, অন্য (written as anya but pronounced as ōnnō "other, different") and অন্ন (written as anna but pronounced as onnō "cooked rice, food"); in these words, the letter অ is combining with two different consonant clusters ন্য (nya) and ন্ন (nna), and while the same letter অ has two different pronunciations, ō and o, the two different consonant clusters have the same pronunciation. Thus, same letters and graphemes can often have different pronunciations depending on their position in a word and different graphemes and letters often have the same pronunciation.

The main reason for these numerous inconsistencies is that there have been lots of sound mergers in Bengali, but the script has failed to account for the sound shifts and consonant mergers in the language. Bengali has lots of tatsam words (words directly derived from Sanskrit) and in all these words, the original spelling has been preserved but the pronunciations have changed due to consonant mergers and sound shifts. In fact, most of the tatsam words have many grapheme-to-phoneme inconsistencies while most of the tadbhav words (native Bengali words) have fairly consistent grapheme-to-phoneme correspondence. Another reason is that Vidyasagar's reformations in the 19th century flooded the Bengali language with lots of Sanskrit words. By the 19th century, the Bengali phonology had diverged a lot from Sanskrit phonology and had lost many of the consonant clusters used in Sanskrit. So when these Sanskrit words re-entered the Bengali vocabulary as tatsam words, their pronunciations were modified, but their spellings were retained. That is why most of the tatsam words are pronounced way different from what they are written or spelt. Almost all the cases of silent letters existing in Bengali are found in the tatsam words. The Bengali writing system, therefore, is often not a true guide for pronunciation.

=== Uses ===
The script used for Bengali, Assamese, and other languages is known as Bengali script. The script is known as the Bengali alphabet for Bengali and its dialects and the Assamese alphabet for Assamese language with some minor variations. Other related languages in the nearby region also make use of the Bengali script like the Meitei language in the Indian state of Manipur, where the Meitei language has been written in the Bengali script for centuries, though the Meitei script has been promoted in recent times.

=== Number system ===
Bengali digits are as follows:

0	1	2	3	4	5	6	7	8	9
০	১	২	৩	৪	৫	৬	৭	৮	৯

Some 19th-century grammars note additional signs for fractions, quarters and sixteenths in particular.

=== Romanisation ===
There are various romanisation systems used for Bengali created in recent years, most of which have failed to represent the true Bengali phonetic sound. The Bengali alphabet has often been included with the group of Brahmic scripts for romanisation where the true phonetic value of Bengali is never represented. Some of them are the International Alphabet of Sanskrit Transliteration, or IAST system (based on diacritics); "Indian languages Transliteration", or ITRANS (uses upper case letters suited for ASCII keyboards); and the National Library at Kolkata romanisation.

In the context of Bengali romanisation, it is important to distinguish transliteration from transcription. Transliteration is orthographically accurate (i.e. the original spelling can be recovered), whereas transcription is phonetically accurate (the pronunciation can be reproduced). As the spelling often does not reflect the actual pronunciation, transliteration and transcription are often different.

Although it might be desirable to use a transliteration scheme where the original Bengali orthography is recoverable from the Latin text, Bengali words are currently romanised on Wikipedia using a phonemic transcription, where the true phonetic pronunciation of Bengali is represented with no reference to how it is written.

The most recent attempt has been by publishers Mitra and Ghosh with the launch of three popular children's books, Abol Tabol, Hasi Khusi and Sahoj Path, in Roman script at the Kolkata Book Fair 2018. Published under the imprint of Benglish Books, these are based on phonetic transliteration and closely follow spellings used in social media but for using an underline to describe soft consonants.

== Grammar ==
Bengali nouns are not assigned gender, which leads to minimal changing of adjectives (inflection). However, nouns and pronouns are moderately declined (altered depending on their function in a sentence) into four cases while verbs are heavily conjugated, and the verbs do not change form depending on the number of the noun. Romani grammar is also closer to Bengali grammar than to that of western Indo-Aryan languages.

=== Word order ===
As a head-final language, Bengali follows a subject–object–verb word order, although variations on this theme are common. Bengali makes use of postpositions, as opposed to the prepositions used in English and most European languages. Determiners follow the noun, while numerals, adjectives, and possessors precede the noun.

Yes–no questions do not require any change to the basic word order; instead, the low (L) tone of the final syllable in the utterance is replaced with a falling (HL) tone. Additionally, optional particles (e.g. কি -ki, না -na, etc.) are often encliticised onto the first or last word of a yes–no question.

Wh-questions are formed by fronting the wh-word to focus position, which is typically the first or second word in the utterance.

=== Nouns ===
Nouns and pronouns are inflected for case, including nominative, objective, genitive (possessive), and locative. The case marking pattern for each noun being inflected depends on the noun's degree of animacy. When a definite article such as -টা -ṭa (singular) or -গুলো -gulo (plural) is added, as in the tables below, nouns are also inflected for number.

In most of Bengali grammar books, cases are divided into 6 categories and an additional possessive case (the possessive form is not recognised as a type of case by Bengali grammarians). But in terms of usage, cases are generally grouped into only 4 categories.

Noun inflection
	Animate		Inanimate	
	Singular	Plural	Singular	Plural
Nominative	ছাত্রটি chatrô-ṭi the student	ছাত্ররা / ছাত্রগণ chatrô-ra {} {} the students	জুতোটা juto-ṭa the shoe	জুতাগুলা / জুতোগুলো juta-gula / juto-gulo the shoes
Objective	ছাত্রটিকে/রে chatrô-ṭi-ke/re the student	ছাত্রদের(কে) chatrô-der(ke) the students	জুতোটা juto-ṭa the shoe	জুতাগুলা / জুতোগুলো juta-gula / juto-gulo the shoes
Genitive	ছাত্রটির chatrô-ṭi-r the student's	ছাত্রদের chatrô-der the students'	জুতোটার juto-ṭa-r the shoe's	জুতাগুলা / জুতোগুলোর juta-gula / juto-gulo-r the shoes'
Locative	–	–	জুতোটায় juto-ṭa-y on/in the shoe	জুতাগুলা / জুতোগুলোতে juta-gula / juto-gulo-te on/in the shoes

When counted, nouns take one of a small set of measure words. Nouns in Bengali cannot be counted by adding the numeral directly adjacent to the noun. An appropriate measure word (MW), a classifier, must be used between the numeral and the noun (most languages of the Mainland Southeast Asia linguistic area are similar in this respect). Most nouns take the generic measure word -টা -ṭa, though other measure words indicate semantic classes (e.g. -জন -jôn for humans). There is also the classifier -khana, and its diminutive form -khani, which attaches only to nouns denoting something flat, long, square, or thin. These are the least common of the classifiers.

Measure words
নয়টা গরু Nôy-ṭa goru nine-MW cow Nine cows	কয়টা বালিশ; Kôy-ṭa balish {how many}-MW pillow How many pillows	অনেকজন লোক; Ônek-jôn lok many-MW person Many people	চার-পাঁচজন শিক্ষক; Ĉar-pãc-jôn shikkhôk four-five-MW teacher Four to five teachers

Measuring nouns in Bengali without their corresponding measure words (e.g. আট বিড়াল aṭ biṛal instead of আটটা বিড়াল aṭ-ṭa biṛal "eight cats") would typically be considered ungrammatical. However, when the semantic class of the noun is understood from the measure word, the noun is often omitted and only the measure word is used, e.g. শুধু একজন থাকবে। Shudhu êk-jôn thakbe (lit. 'Only one-'MW will remain.") would be understood to mean "Only one person will remain", given the semantic class implicit in -জন -jôn.

In this sense, all nouns in Bengali, unlike most other Indo-European languages, are similar to mass nouns.

=== Verbs ===
There are two classes of verbs: finite and non-finite. Non-finite verbs have no inflection for tense or person, while finite verbs are fully inflected for person (first, second, third), tense (present, past, future), aspect (simple, perfect, progressive), and honour (intimate, familiar, and formal), but not for number. Conditional, imperative, and other special inflections for mood can replace the tense and aspect suffixes. The number of inflections on many verb roots can total more than 200.

Inflectional suffixes in the morphology of Bengali vary from region to region, along with minor differences in syntax.

Bengali differs from most Indo-Aryan Languages in the zero copula, where the copula or connective be is often missing in the present tense. Thus, "he is a teacher" is তিনি শিক্ষক se shikkhôk, (literally "he teacher"). In this respect, Bengali is similar to Russian and Hungarian.

== Vocabulary ==
Origins of words in the Bengali language
1. Tadbhavas in Bengali (inherited Indo-Aryan vocabulary) (16.0%)
2. Tatsamas in Bengali (direct borrowings from Sanskrit) (40.0%)
3. Native words (indigenous, "Desi" words) (16.0%)
4. Foreign loanwords (words originating from Persian, Turkish, Arabic, English, Portuguese, etc.) (28.0%)

Bengali is typically thought to have around 100,000 separate words, of which 16,000 (16%) are considered to be তদ্ভব tôdbhôbô, or Tadbhava (inherited Indo-Aryan vocabulary), 40,000 (40%) are তৎসম tôtśômô or Tatsama (words directly borrowed from Sanskrit), and borrowings from দেশী deśi, or "indigenous" words, which are at around 16,000 (16%) of the Bengali vocabulary. The rest are বিদেশী bideśi or "foreign" sources, including Persian, Turkish, Arabic, and English among others, accounting for around 28,000 (28%) of all Bengali words, highlighting the significant influence that foreign languages and cultures have had on the Bengali language throughout Bengal's long history of contact with different peoples and the cultural exchanges that came with such interactions. Bengali is reportedly similar to Assamese and has a lexical similarity of 40 per cent with Nepali.

According to Suniti Kumar Chatterji, dictionaries from the early 20th century attributed a little more than 50% of the Bengali vocabulary to native words (i.e., naturally modified Sanskrit words, corrupted forms of Sanskrit words, and loanwords non-Indo-European languages). About 45% per cent of Bengali words are unmodified Sanskrit, and the remaining words are from foreign languages. However, more modern sources cite that this is not the case with Bengali vocabulary, as there are far more dominant foreign influences that accurately reflect the way modern Bengalis speak and utilise Bengali. Persian is also thought to have influenced many grammatical forms. More recent studies suggest that the use of foreign words has been increasing, mainly because of the preference of Bengali speakers for the colloquial style. Because of centuries of contact with Europeans, Turkic peoples, and Persians, Bengali has absorbed numerous words from foreign languages, often totally integrating these borrowings into the core vocabulary.

Persian influence was significant for the development of Bengali up to the modern day, and was the primary official language in the region for 600 years, until British rule, when it was changed to English in 1836. In fact, there was so much Persian influence that a register of highly Persianized Bengali, known as Dobhashi appeared in medieval Bengal.

The most common borrowings from foreign languages come from three types of contact. After close contact with several indigenous Austroasiatic languages, and later the Delhi Sultanate, the Bengal Sultanate, and the Mughal Empire, whose court language was Persian, numerous Arabic, Persian, and Chaghatai words were absorbed into the lexicon.

Later, East Asian travellers and lately European colonialism brought words from Portuguese, French, Dutch, and most significantly English during the colonial period.

== Sample text ==
The following is a sample text in Bengali of Article 1 of the Universal Declaration of Human Rights:

সমস্ত মানুষ স্বাধীনভাবে সমান মর্যাদা এবং অধিকার নিয়ে জন্মগ্রহণ করে। তাঁদের বিবেক এবং বুদ্ধি আছে; সুতরাং সকলেরই একে অপরের প্রতি ভ্রাতৃত্বসুলভ মনোভাব নিয়ে আচরণ করা উচিত।
Sômôstô manush shadhinbhabe sôman môrjada ebông ôdhikar niye jônmôgrôhôn kôre. Tãder bibek ebông buddhi achhe; sutôrang sôkôleri êke ôpôrer prôti bhratrittôsulôbh mônobhab niye achôrôn kôra uchit.
ʃɔmosto manuʃ ʃadʱinbʱabe ʃoman mɔɾdʒada eboŋ odʱikaɾ nie̯e dʒɔnmoɡrohon kɔɾe tãdeɾ bibek eboŋ budʱːi atʃʰe ʃutoraŋ ʃɔkoleɾi ɛke ɔporeɾ proti bʱratritːoʃulɔbʱ monobʱab nie̯e atʃorɔn kɔra utʃit
All human free-manner-in equal dignity and right taken birth-take do. Their reason and intelligence exist; therefore everyone-indeed one another's towards brotherhood-ly attitude taken conduct do should.
All human beings are born free and equal in dignity and rights. They possess conscience and reason. Therefore, everyone should act in a spirit of brotherhood towards each other.

== See also ==
- Bangla Academy (Bangladesh)
- Bangla Academy (West Bengal)
- Bengali numerals
- Bengali-language newspapers
