= Bengali Language Introduction Act, 1987 =

Legislation in Bangladesh

Jatiya Sangsad
- Long title: An Act to give full effect to Article 3 of the Constitution of the People's Republic of Bangladesh
- Citation: Act No. 2 of 1987
- Territorial extent: Bangladesh
- Enacted by: Jatiya Sangsad
- Enacted: 8 March 1987
- Assented to: 8 March 1987
- Status: In force

The Bangla Language Introduction Act, 1987 (Bengali: বাংলা ভাষা প্রচলন আইন, ১৯৮৭) is an Act passed by the Jatiya Sangsad to give full effect to Article 3 of the Constitution of Bangladesh. The statute states all records and correspondences, laws, proceedings in court and other legal actions must be written in the Bangla language in all courts, government or semi-government offices, and autonomous institutions in Bangladesh.

The law was considered "a revolutionary step taken by the State" intended to empower the language of the common people and remove the language barrier installed by the British colonial authorities, which was construed to have obstructed access to public services and justice for ordinary citizens. As a result of the law, all subsequent bills passed by the Jatiya Sangsad have been enacted in Bengali since 1987. Notwithstanding the Act, English is often used by the Supreme Court of Bangladesh, which has elicited criticism for its perceived violation of the constitutional right of Bangladeshi citizens following the bloodshed of the martyrs of the Bengali language movement. In February every year, the Act is discussed in seminars and newspaper op-eds.

== Background ==
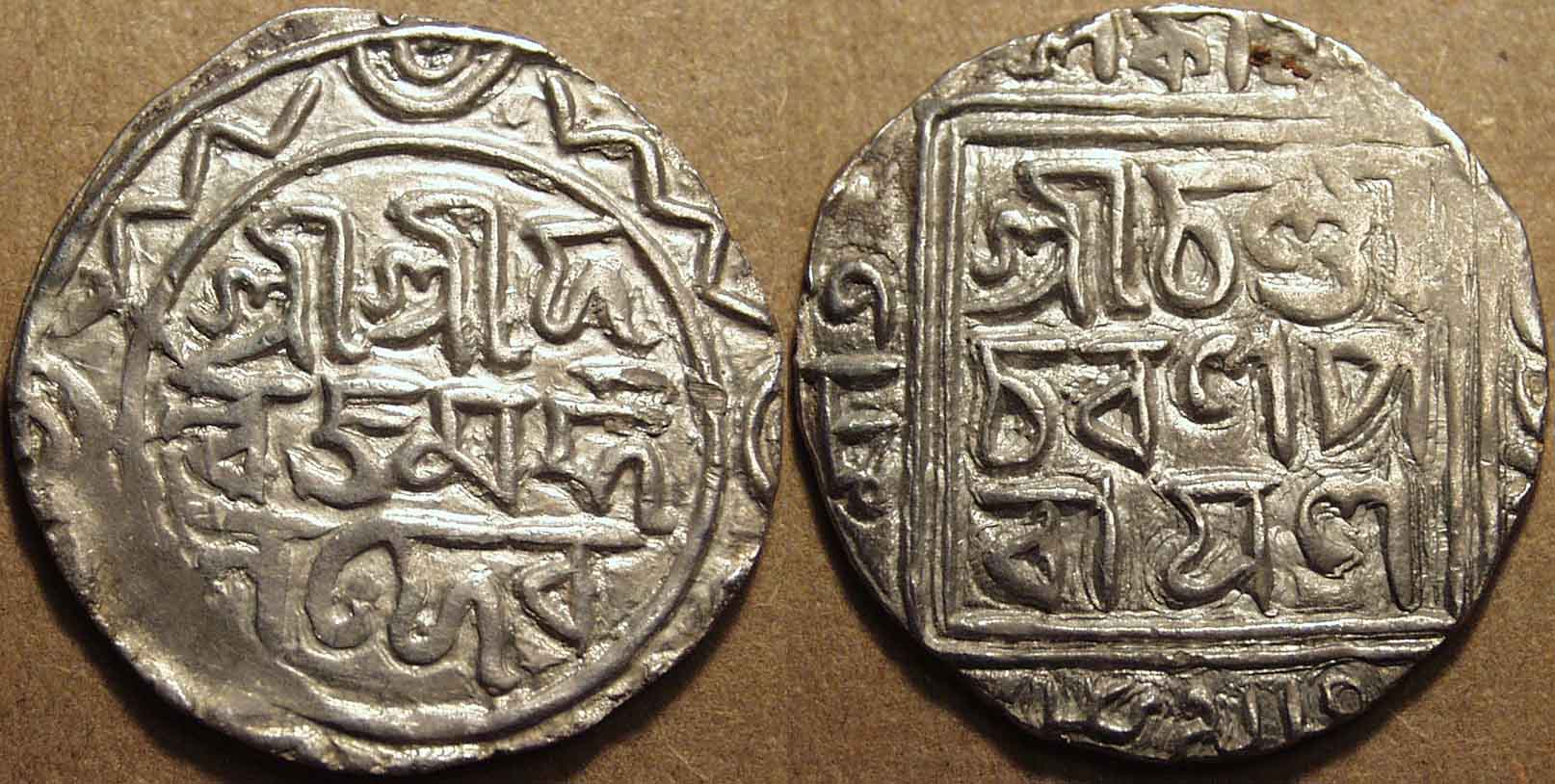
Silver Taka with Bengali script from the Sultanate of Bengal, 1339 Shaka era (1417 CE)

Bangladesh is a language-based nation state. The Bengali language has developed over the course of more than 1,300 years and became one of the most prominent and diverse literary traditions in the world. Bengali was an official court language during the Sultanate of Bengal. Muslim rulers promoted the literary development in Bengali. Bengali literature, with its millennium-old literary history, has extensively developed since the Bengali Renaissance. The Bengali language movement from 1948 to 1956 demanding Bengali to be an official language of Pakistan fostered Bengali nationalism in East Bengal (renamed East Pakistan in 1956) leading to the emergence of Bangladesh in 1971. Bengali was adopted as an official language of Pakistan along with Urdu in the article 214(1) when the first constitution of Pakistan was enacted on 29 February 1956. In 1999, UNESCO recognized 21 February as International Mother Language Day in recognition of the Bengali language movement.

After the liberation of Bangladesh in 1971, the third article of the Constitution of Bangladesh states Bengali to be the sole official language of the country. With more than 98% of Bangladeshis fluent in Bengali as their first language, Bangladesh is the only monolingual country in South Asia and Bengali is regarded as the de facto national language of Bangladesh. On 8 March 1987, the Government of Bangladesh introduced the Bengali Language Implementation Act, 1987 to ensure mandatory use of Bengali in all domestic affairs except in the cases of foreign relations. Previously on 12 March 1975, Sheikh Mujibur Rahman during his tenure as the President ordered in a government notification that all official activities in all courts and government offices must be performed in Bengali.

Bengali is the 5th largest language by number of native speakers and 7th largest language by total number of speakers in the world. The Bengali language is the quintessential element of Bangladeshi identity and binds together a culturally diverse region.

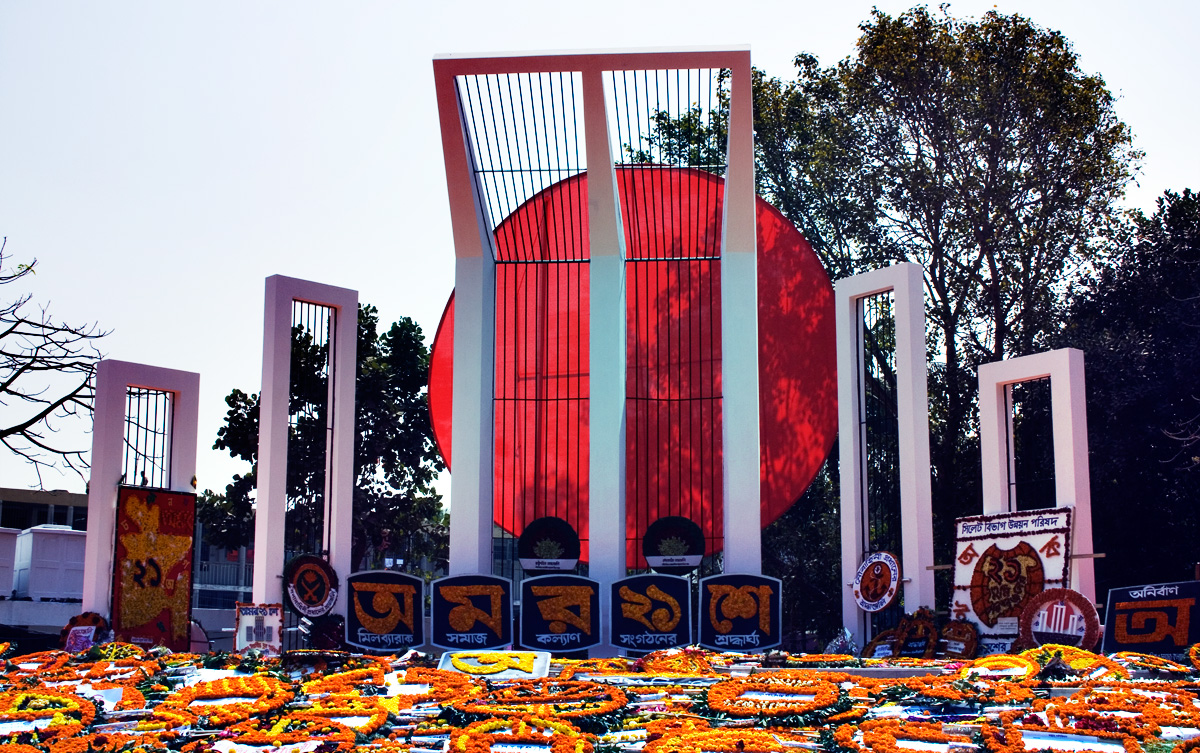
The Shaheed Minar commemorates the martyrs of the Bengali language movement who sacrificed their lives to make Bengali the official language of their country.

== Provisions ==
=== Section 3 ===
3(1) After the introduction of this Act, all records and correspondences, laws, proceedings in court and other legal actions must be written in Bengali in all courts, government or semi-government offices, and autonomous institutions in Bangladesh.

3(2) If any one submits an appeal or petition at any offices mentioned in clause 3(1) in any language other than Bengali, the appeal or petition will be considered illegal and ineffective.

3(3) If any government staff or officer breaches this act, he or she will be accused of violating Bangladesh Civil Servant Order and Appeal Rules, and necessary actions will be taken against him or her.

=== Section 4 ===
4 By notification in the official gazette, the government can create and impose necessary rules to enforce this Act.

== Implementation ==
=== Legislation and administration ===
Following the act, all legislative and administrative activities are being done in Bengali since 1987.

=== In the judiciary ===
In all district courts, Bengali is the medium of communication both for speaking and writing petitions and verdicts; but in the Supreme Court, verdicts are often delivered in English.

On 9 February 2011, Bangladesh Law Commission recommended that the Act be implemented in the Supreme Court as well to ensure easy access to justice for all. Bangladesh Law Commission also stated that application of Bengali in all sphere of public life would be the proper way to observe Language Movement Day. The then chairman of Law Commission, Shah Alam wrote that due to the vested interest of certain quarter, Bengali was not being applied properly in the Supreme Court. Some suggested that "under section 137 of the Code of Civil Procedure, 1908 and section 558 of the Code of Criminal Procedure, 1898 Bangladesh government may issue Order making use of Bengali mandatory in superior and subordinate judiciary."

=== In the financial sector ===
While Bengali is predominantly used in the official activities of Bangladesh Bank, Bengali has a marginal presence in the commercial private banks to the dismay of their respective clients as most of them find it difficult to navigate through their financial documents in English. In 2018, Bangladesh Bank instructed all banks to use Bengali "in loan approval letters for implementing the goal of the Bengali Language Introduction Act, 1987 and protecting the client's interest."

=== In other areas of public life ===
In February 2014, following a writ petition by an advocate named Yunus Ali Akand at the High Court, Justice Qazi Rezaul Haque issued a rule that Bengali should be used everywhere in Bangladesh, in all offices, courts and media, following the act of 1987. He further instructed that Bengali should be used on signboards, billboards, number plate of motor vehicles and all electronic media excluding foreign high embassies. Three months later, the Ministry of Public Administration ordered all city corporations, and cantonment boards to implement the high court rule. Then again on 23 February 2016, the Ministry of Public Administration gave the same instruction, but the proper implementation is yet to be seen.

== Reception ==
The act has been considered significant to empower people's language and remove colonial linguistic oppression. Muhammad Habibur Rahman, a former Chief Justice of Bangladesh stated that due to the lack of proper government initiative, English is still used frequently in the Supreme Court. Rahman further stated that if justice is a virtue and a service to the people, then verdicts should be given in Bengali. He also stated that if the people of the country want that all works in the Supreme Court must be operated in Bengali, then the representatives of the people in the Jatiya Sangsad (Parliament of Bangladesh) must enact and implement another law to ensure the use of Bengali in the Supreme Court. Sheikh Hasina, the longest serving Prime Minister of Bangladesh, also suggested that the judges should deliver their verdicts in Bengali so that every Bangladeshi can read them.
