= Bengali consonant clusters =

Consonant clusters in Bengali are very common word-initially and elsewhere due to a long history of borrowing from Sanskrit, a language with a large cluster inventory. A substantial number of non-initial clusters have also been borrowed from Persian. Some words borrowed from European languages also have the same features as those from the former two. A handful of words from non-standard dialects of Bengali include native clusters.

List of all Bengali consonant conjuncts.

== Syllable-initial clusters ==
Native Bengali (তদ্ভব tôdbhôbo) words do not contain initial consonant clusters; the maximum syllabic structure is CVC (i.e. one vowel flanked by a consonant on each side). Many speakers of Bengali restrict their phonology to this pattern, even when using Sanskrit or English borrowings, such as গেরাম geram (CV.CVC) for গ্রাম gram (CCVC) "village" or ইস্কুল iskul (VC.CVC) for স্কুল skul (CCVC) "school".

Sanskrit (তৎসম tôtshômo) words borrowed into Bengali, however, possess a wide range of clusters, expanding the maximum syllable structure to CCCVC. Some of these clusters, such as the mr in মৃত্যু mrittu "death" or the sp in স্পষ্ট spôshṭo "clear", have become extremely common, and can be considered legal consonant clusters in Bengali.

English and other foreign (বিদেশী bideshi) borrowings add even more cluster types into the Bengali inventory, further increasing the syllable capacity to CCCVCCCC, as commonly used loanwords such as ট্রেন ṭren "train" and গ্লাস glash "glass" are now even included in leading Bengali dictionaries.

Initial Clusters
Cluster	Source language(s)	Example(s) in orthography	Example(s) in transliteration	Translation
kr	Sanskrit; English	কৃমি ক্রিকেট	krimi krikeṭ	worm cricket (sport)
kl	Sanskrit; English	ক্লান্তি ক্লাস	klanti klash	fatigue class
khr	Greek (via English)	খ্রিস্টান	khrishṭan	Christian
gr	Sanskrit; English	গ্রাম গ্রিক	gram grik	village Greek
gl	Sanskrit; English	গ্লানি গ্লাস	glani glash	sorrow glass
ṭr	English	ট্রেন	ṭren	train
ḍr	English	ড্রাইভার	ḍraibhar	driver
tr	Sanskrit	ত্রিশ	trish	thirty
thr	English	থ্রু	thru	through
dr	Sanskrit	দৃশ্য	drishsho	view
dhr	Sanskrit	ধ্রুবতারা	dhrubotara	North star
nr	Sanskrit	নৃতত্ত্ব	nritôtto	anthropology
pr	Sanskrit; English	প্রশ্ন প্রেশার	proshno preshar	question pressure
pl	Sanskrit; English	প্লাবন প্লেন	plabon plen	flood plane
fr	English	ফ্রান্স	frans	France
fl	English	ফ্লাইট	flaiṭ	flight
br	Sanskrit; English	বৃষ্টি ব্রাশ	brishṭi brash	rain brush
bl	English	ব্লাউজ	blauj	blouse
bhr	Sanskrit	ভ্রু	bhru	brow
mr	Sanskrit	মৃত্যু	mrittu	death
ml	Sanskrit	ম্লান	mlan	melancholy
sk	Sanskrit; English	স্কন্ধ স্কুল	skôndho skul	shoulder school
skr	English	স্ক্রু	skru	screw
skh	Sanskrit	স্খলন	skhôlon	slip
sṭ	English	স্টেশন	sṭeshon	station
sṭr	English	স্ট্রেট	sṭreṭ	straight
st	Sanskrit	স্তম্ভ	stômbho	tower
str	Sanskrit	স্ত্রী	stri	Wife
sth	Sanskrit	স্থানীয়	sthanio	local
sn	Sanskrit; English	স্নান স্নো	snan sno	bath snow
sp	Sanskrit; English	স্পষ্ট স্পেশাল	spôshṭo speshal	clear special
spr	Sanskrit; English	স্পৃহা স্প্রিং	spriha spring	desire spring (coil)
sf	Sanskrit	স্ফূর্তি	sfurti	delight
sm	English	স্মার্ট	smarṭ	smart (good-looking)
sr	Sanskrit	শ্রমিক	sromik	laborer
sl	Sanskrit; English	শ্লীলতা স্লোগান	slilota slogan	(protest) chant (<slogan)
hr	Sanskrit	হৃদয়	hridôe	heart
hl	Sanskrit	হ্লাদিনী	hladini	

== Syllable-final clusters ==
Final consonant clusters are rare in Bengali. Most final consonant clusters were borrowed into Bengali from English, as in লিফ্‌ট lifṭ "lift, elevator" and ব্যাংক bêngk "bank". However, final clusters do exist in some native Bengali words, although rarely in standard pronunciation. One example of a final cluster in a standard Bengali word would be গঞ্জ gônj, which is found in names of hundreds of cities and towns across Bengal, including নবাবগঞ্জ Nôbabgônj and মানিকগঞ্জ Manikgônj. Some nonstandard varieties of Bengali make use of final clusters quite often. For example, in some Purbo (eastern) dialects, final consonant clusters consisting of a nasal and its corresponding oral stop are common, as in চান্দ chand "moon". The Standard Bengali equivalent of chand would be চাঁদ chãd, with a nasalized vowel instead of the final cluster.

Final Clusters
Cluster	Source language(s)	Example(s) in orthography	Example(s) in transliteration	Translation
kṭ	English			
kt	Arabic	ওয়াক্ত	oakt	Muslim prayer time
kf	Arabic	ওয়াক্‌ফ	oakf	waqf
ksh	Persian			
ks	English	ট্যাক্স	ṭêks	tax
ngk	English	ব্যাংক	bêngk	bank
nch	English	লঞ্চ	lônch	steamboat (<launch)
nj	dialectal	গঞ্জ	gônj	marketplace
nṭ	English	প্যান্ট	pênṭ	pants
nḍ	English	পাউন্ড	paunḍ	pound
nd	dialectal	চান্দ	chand	moon
ndh	dialectal	কান্ধ	kandh	shoulder
ns	Persian; English	চান্স	chans	chance
fṭ	English	লিফ্‌ট	lifṭ	elevator/lift
fs	Arabic	নাফ্‌স	nafs	self
mp	English	ল্যাম্প	lêmp	lamp
rk	Persian; English	পার্ক	park	park
rch	English	টর্চ	ṭôrch	torch
rj	English	লাঠি-চার্জ	laṭhi-charj	baton-charge
rṭ	English	শার্ট	sharṭ	shirt
rḍ	English	বোর্ড	borḍ	(administrative) board
rth	English			
rd	Arabic	ফর্দ	fôrd	inventory sheet
rn	English	হর্ন	hôrn	(car) horn
rp	English	শার্প	sharp	sharp
rb	English			
rbh	English	নার্ভ	narbh/narv	nerve
rm	English	ফর্ম	fôrm	form
rl	English	কার্ল	karl	curl
rs	English	নার্স	nars	nurse
rsṭ	English	ফার্স্ট	farsṭ	first
rsh	Persian			
lṭ	English	বেল্ট	belṭ	belt
sk	English	রিস্ক	risk	risk
sṭ	English	লাস্ট	lasṭ	last
st	Persian	দোস্ত	dost	friend
sht	Persian	গোশ্ত	gosht	meat
