= Institute of Language Studies and Research =

Indian research institute

- Institute of Language Studies and Research
- Abbreviation: ILSR
- Established: 1963; 63 years ago (as The Institute of English, Calcutta)
- Type: Government Institution
- Purpose: Linguistics
- Headquarters: Kolkata
- Location: Kolkata, India
- Parent organization: Department of Higher Education (West Bengal)
- Website: silsr.wb.gov.in

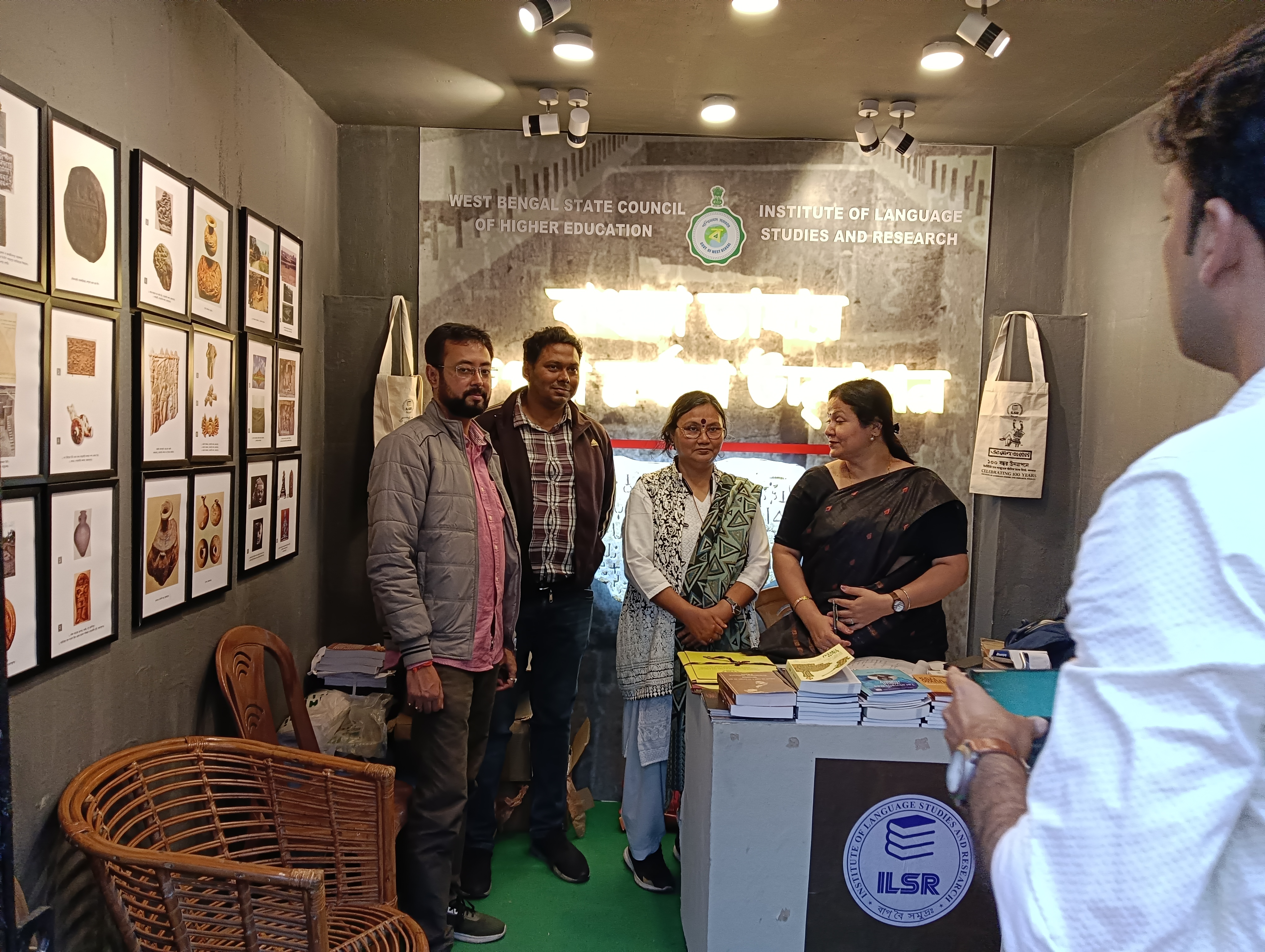
A stall of the Institute of Language Studies and Research at the International Kolkata Book Fair 2025, held at the Boimela Prangan, Salt Lake City (Bidhannagar).

The Institute of Language Studies and Research (ILSR) is a research institute based in Kolkata. ILSR functions as a nodal centre for research, documentation of language and culture-related materials, translation studies and training in cultural and linguistic interaction. The institute was originally known as Institute of English, Calcutta (IEC) which was set up in 1963 by the Government of West Bengal to impart training in English Language Teaching (ELT) to in-service school teachers and accordingly used to offer two times per year a diploma course. Later the institute was renamed as Institute of Language Studies and Research in 2021. It is an institution of higher learning with an exclusive focus on Bengali language, linguistics, translation and cultural studies. It is an institution that has helped the Bengali language achieve the status of a classical language through advanced research.

== Schools ==
The Institute of Language Studies and Research has three schools:

- School of Linguistic Studies
- School of Languages
- School of Translation and Cultural Studies
