= Old Bengali =

Early form of Bengali

- Adi Bangla
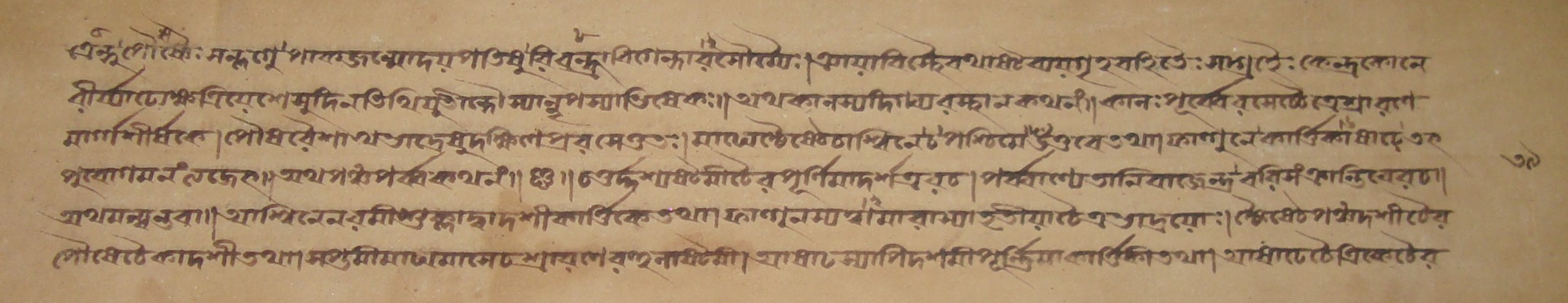
- Page no. 39 of the manuscript Charyapada, having the content in Old Bengali
- Region: Bengal region
- Ethnicity: Bengalis
- Era: Mostly developed into Middle Bengali by the 14th century
- Language family: Indo-European: Indo-Iranian; Indo-Aryan; Eastern Indo-Aryan; Old Bengali
- Early form: Gaudi Prakrit
- Writing system: Gaudi script

Language codes
- ISO 639-3: –

Old Bengali was the earliest recorded form of the Bengali language, spoken in the Bengal region of eastern Indian subcontinent during the Middle Ages. It developed from an Apabhraṃśa of Magadhi Prakrit around 650 AD, and the first Bengali literary works date from the 8th century. Between 1200 and 1350 AD, no written form or literary work of Bengali language is found; during this period the Islamic conquest took place in Bengal. It is marked as the barren age, and also marks the end of the Old Bengali era, as the Middle Bengali language developed later.

Old Bengali is an Indo-Aryan language that is one of the Eastern Indo-Aryan languages, and its closest relatives are Old Odia and Kamarupi Prakrit. Like other Old Eastern Indo-Aryan languages, it is distinct from Modern Bengali and is not fully comprehensible to Modern Bengali speakers without study. Within Old Bengali grammar, the verb evolved and a letter is omitted from a ligature formed by consonants.

== History ==
Old Bengali was spoken in the Bengal region which became the Pala Empire and the Sena kingdom. These included present-day Bangladesh, the Indian state West Bengal and its western border areas of Bihar, Jharkhand and Odisha.

According to Suniti Kumar, it overlapped the last Apabhraṃśa phase. Proto-Bengali was the last stage of an already decayed order, so it inflection less than later languages with its new postpositional affixes and other devices. Chatterji compares it to the 'Sea Old' period of modern Romance and Teutonic languages. Old Bengali is dated to 650 AD, and it originated from proto-Bengali, a form of the Bengali language of the period before 600 AD.

A Sanskrit-Chinese dictionary compiled by the Chinese poet Li-Yen in 782 AD shows the presence of Bengali. A four-volume research document "Classical Bangla" published in 2024 by the Kolkata-based institute "Institute of Language Studies and Research" (ILSR), mentions the presence of 51 Bengali words in the dictionary. The inclusion or rather Compulsion to include of the Bengali (Bengali word) as a third language in the Sanskrit-Chinese dictionary indicates the fact that—Bengali was already standardized and was the dominant language considered as the language of the geographical region (Bengal). The lexicon strongly supports the existence of Old Bengali in the 8th century or earlier, including many Bengali words, some of which are listed below:

Old Bengali	Modern Bengali	English meaning
āiśa	āśô, ēśô	(you) come
śuna	śunô, śonô	(you) hear
ki jani	ke jane	who knows
āśai	āśē	(he) comes
Taṛātāṛi	Tāṛatāṛi	hurry up
triśa	triś	thirty
chatvariśa	choutriś	thirtyfour
kachi	kôchi	small/tiny
bhātāra	bhātār	husband
moṭā	moṭā	fat
māṅsa	maṅsô	meat

Vajrayani and Sahajani Acharyas composed charyas between the tenth and twelfth centuries AD. There is disagreement among historians about the period of composition. According to Suniti Kumar Chatterji and Prabodh Chandra Bagchi, the Charyapadas were composed between the 10th and 12th centuries; but Muhammad Shahidullah and Rahul Sankrityayan put this period back by another 200 years and expressed the opinion that the period of Charya's composition was from eighth to twelfth century AD. Some of the Old Bengali songs compiled in Mānasollāsa—also known as Abhilashitartha Chintamani—were composed in the third decade of the twelfth century. Chalukya king Someshvara III was the patron of the book. The songs were composed in the Bengal and circulated as far as Maharashtra. The 12th-century text Sekhasubhodaya, written by the court poet of King Lakshmana Sena, has two songs, one proverb and five rhymed couplets in the Bengali language.

== Phonology ==
=== Sound changes ===
Some of the major sound changes that took place in the history of Old Bengali were as follows:

- One of the consonants of the ligatures was lost, and the preceding vowel was lengthened to compensate for this loss. Exception to this rule is found in the Ardha-tatsama words. There is a loss of assimilative consonant but the preceding vowel is not lengthened. Ligatures formed by joining with nasal consonants are also often unassimilated; however, in Old Bengali the preceding vowel of such added consonants is lengthened.
- The nasal consonant was lost in many cases, and as a result the preceding vowel became nasal.
- Widespread use of /s/ (স্‌) in place of (/ʃ/) (শ্‌).
- Multiple vowels located side by side were retained. But multiple vowels at the end of words were pronounced as compound vowel and eventually two together became a single vowel.

== Grammar ==
=== Morphology ===
Signs of Sanskrit, Prakrit and Avahatta can be found in the grammar of Old Bengali in various—part of speech, declension for case, genders, numbers etc.

In Old Bengali, adjectives had gender, which has declined in Modern Bengali. In the case of adverbs, the suffix /æ/ (এ) or /æm̐/ (এঁ) was added. Besides, adverbs are made by adding /i/ (ই) or /ja/ (ইয়া) to infinitive verbs.

There were two types of pronouns—personal and demonstrative. Personal pronouns were of two types, and demonstrative pronouns were of five types—general demonstrative, near demonstratives, far demonstrative, relative demonstrative and indefinite demonstrative or indefinite demonstrative. There were no gender differences in pronouns. I used to refer to any gender, male or female.

== Literature ==
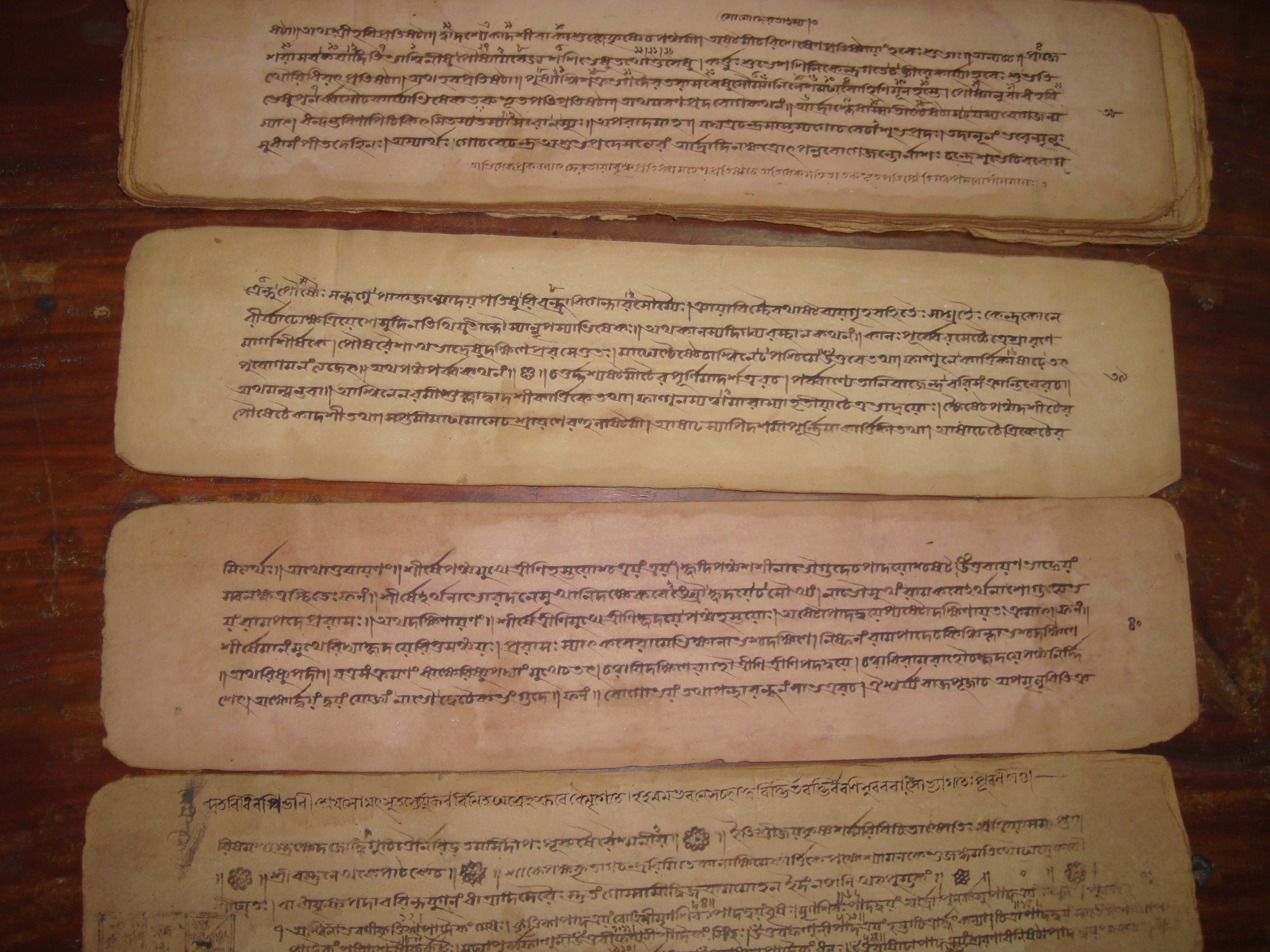
Four pages—38 to 41—of the Charyapada manuscript

The collection of Old Bengali literature is small but still significant, with only a few surviving manuscripts. Many of the written works of the Buddhist Tantric Sahajiyas mingle in Old Bengali, which is one of the richest and most significant bodies of literature preserved among the early language groups derived from Magadhi Prakrit.

The most important surviving work of Old Bengali literature is the Charyapada, a collection of devotional song; which is considered as the best sign created in Old Bengali. According to Tibetan sources, the original manuscript was called Charyagiti-koshavrtti and contained 100 verses. But till now 51 Padas or verses of the manuscript have been discovered. There are also some literary works, such as few Bengali songs and proverbs compiled in Sekshuvodaya by Halayudha Mishra, the court poet of King Lakshmana Sena, some rhymes and poems of Bidagdha Mukhomandal. Bandyaghatiya Sarbananda wrote the note on the Sanskrit lexicon Amarkosh by Amar Singh, which contains about 400 Bengali words which are consider ed to be traces of Old Bengali.

Some of the songs written in Old Bengali were compiled in Mānasōllōsa or Abhilaṣitārthacintāmaṇi. These Bengali songs were placed in the gitbinod section of the Sanskrit text. The theme of the songs was the story of Krishna's lila with the gopis and Vishnu in various incarnations.

== Bibliography ==
- Mukherji, Tarapada (1963). The old bengali language and text (PDF). Calcutta (now Kolkata): Calcutta University Press.
- Shaw, Dr. Rameswar (21 February 1984). সাধারণ ভাষাবিজ্ঞান ও বাংলা ভাষা (in Bengali). Kolkata: Pustak Bipani. ISBN 81-85471-12-6.
- Bhattacharya, Subhash (2012). ভাষার তত্ত্ব ও বাংলা ভাষা (in Bengali). Kolkata: Bangiya Sahitya Samsad. ISBN 978-93-82012-12-2.
- Chatterji, Suniti Kumar (1926a). The Origin and Development of the Bengali Language. Vol. 1. Kolkata: Calcutta University Press.
- Chatterji, Suniti Kumar (1926b). The Origin and Development of the Bengali Language. Vol. 2. Kolkata: Calcutta University Press.
- Shahidullah, Dr. Muhammad (1998). Bangla Vasar Itibritto (in Bengali). Dhaka: Mowla Brothers.
- Ray, Niharranjan (1993). বাঙ্গালীর ইতিহাস: আদি পর্ব Bāṅgālīra itihāsa: Ādiparba [History of Bengalis: Early Phases] (PDF) (in Bengali) (Dey's [3rd] ed.). Kolkata: Dey's Publishing. ISBN 81-7079-270-3.
- Ray, Niharranjan (2022). বাঙ্গালীর ইতিহাস: আদি পর্ব Bāṅgālīra itihāsa: Ādiparba [History of Bengalis: Early Phases] (in Bengali) (Dey's [17th] ed.). Kolkata: Dey's Publishing. ISBN 978-81-295-1977-1.
