= Central Bengali dialects =

Group of dialects of Bengali

Rāṛhī Bengali
- Central Bengali; Ghoti Bengali; Hooghly-Bhagirathi Bengali
- রাঢ়ী বাংলা
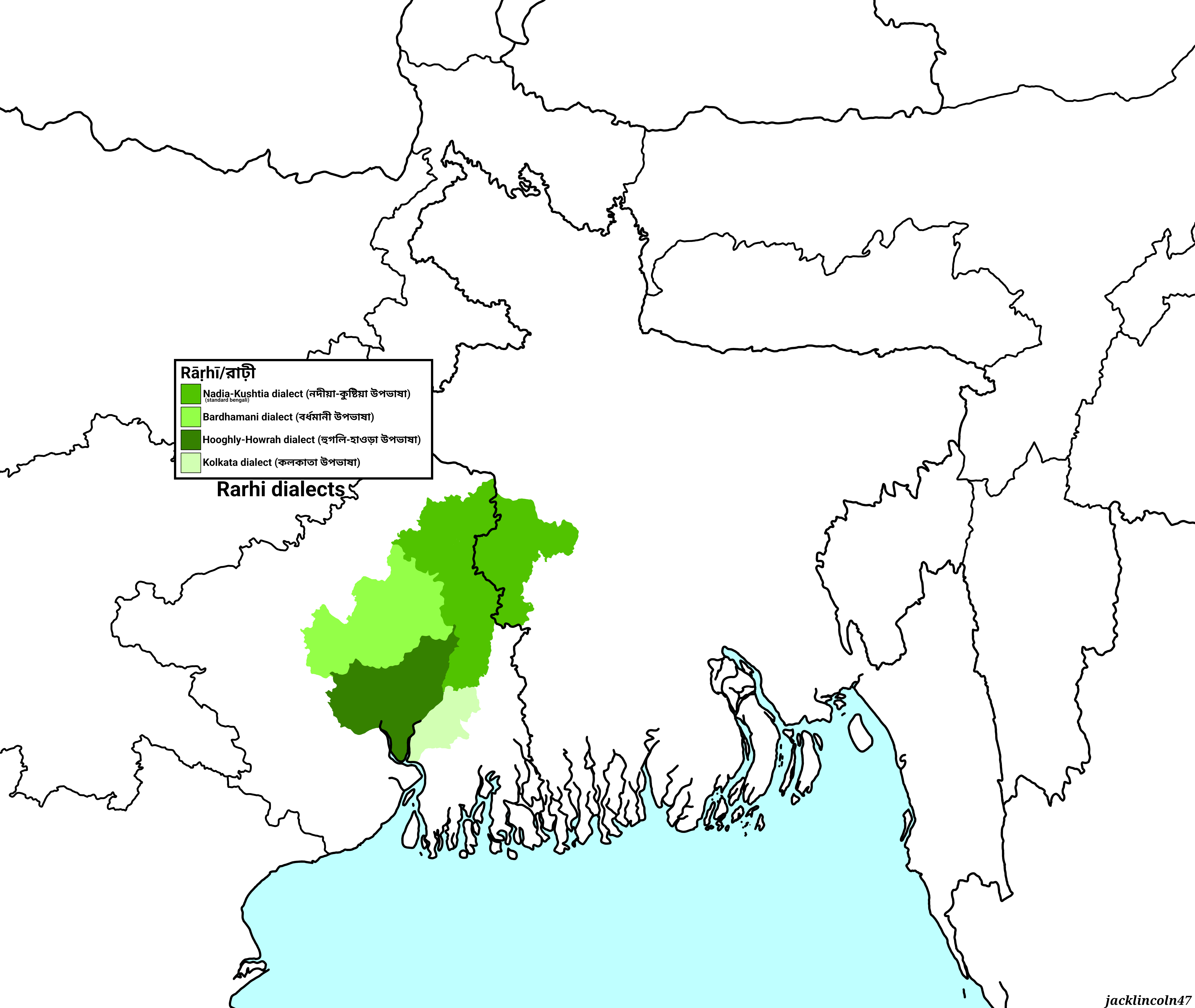
- Native to: India, Bangladesh
- Region: India: Nadia, Murshidabad, Purba Bardhaman, Hooghly, Howrah, Kolkata, parts of Midnapore Bangladesh: Kushtia, Meherpur, Chuadanga
- Ethnicity: Bengali people of Presidency Division and Greater Kushtia
- Language family: Indo-European: Indo Iranian; Indo Aryan; Eastern Zone; Bengali-Assamese; Bengali; Rāṛhī Bengali
- Early forms: Gaudi Prakrit: Old Bengali; Middle Bengali
- Writing system: Bengali alphabet

Language codes
- ISO 639-3: –
- Glottolog: cent1983 Rarhi

Central Bengali or Rāṛhī/Rāḍhī Bengali (Bengali: রাঢ়ী বাংলা, romanized: Rāṛhī Bāṅlā, pronounced [ɾaɽhiː baŋla]) is a group of dialects of the Bengali language, spoken in the West-Central part of Bengal, in and around the Bhagirathi River basin of Nadia district and other districts of the Presidency division in West Bengal, as well as the undivided Kushtia district region of western Bangladesh. Associated with the upper Delta and eastern Rarh region of Bengal, it forms the basis of the standard variety of Bengali.

== Geographical boundaries ==
This dialect is prevalent in Central Bengal specifically in the West Bengal districts of Kolkata, Nadia, Howrah, Hooghly, Ghatal and Tamluk in Midnapore, Murshidabad and Purba Bardhaman. It is also spoken natively in the Chuadanga, Kushtia and Meherpur districts of Bangladesh, which were a part of the Nadia district prior to the 1947 Partition of India. Along with Eastern Bengali dialects, Modern Standard Bengali has been formed on the basis of this dialect.

== Features ==
=== Phonology ===
- Extensive use of Obhishruti (অভিশ্রুতি, /obʱisrut̪i/, umlaut) e.g. Early Beng. Koriya (করিয়া, /koria/, meaning - having done) > Beng. Koirya (কইর‍্যা, /koira/) > Beng. Kore (করে, /kore/).
- The change of অ to ও, when অ is the first sound of a word where the অ is followed by ই(ি), ও(ো), ক্ষ or য. E.g. Ati (written অতি, means 'excess') is pronounced as Oti (ওতি, /ot̪i/).
- Use of vowel harmony. E.g. Bilati (বিলাতি, /bilat̪i/, meaning - foreign) became Biliti (বিলিতি, /bilit̪i/).
- Most of the time, if the first sound of a word is 'n', it becomes 'l' and if it is 'l', it becomes 'n' (e.g. lonka (লঙ্কা, /lônkā/) becomes nonka (নঙ্কা, /nônkā/) and lebu (লেবু, /lēbu/, meaning - lemon) becomes nebu (নেবু, /nēbu/) ইন the dialect).
- The Aspirated 'chh' at the after of a word is pronounced like not aspirated 'ch' (e.g Giyechhi (গিয়েছি, /giyēchhi/, meaning - have gone) becomes gechi (গেচি, /gēchi/) in Rarhi dialect).

=== Morphology ===
- The Standard Colloquial Bengali plural affix 'gulô' (গুলো) is pronounced 'gunô' (গুনো) in the dialect of eastern Rarh, whereas it becomes 'gulā' or 'gulān' in Western Rarhi and eastern Bengali dialects.
- The suffix for the third-person intransitive verb is "-lo" (e.g., se gelo), but the suffix for the transitive verb is "-le" in the immediate past tense (e.g. se bolle).
- In the immediate past tense, the first person affix is (i)lum or (i)nu. For example, the standard Bengali word 'kôr(i)lām' (কর'লাম) becomes kôr(i)lum (কর'লুম) or kôr(i)nu (কর'নু).
- In the locative case, the suffixes "-e" and "-te" are used like Standard Bengali.
- The 'gô' suffix which is added to the singular genetive to form the genetive plural is found in Rarhi dialect speaking areas but it is commonly used in Vanga dialects e.g āmā-gô (our), tômā-gô (your). The genetive plural suffix '-der' is commonly used in this dialect e.g āmā-der (our), tômā-der (your).

=== Obhishruti and Opinihiti ===
Ôbhishruti (অভিশ্রুতি, /obʱisrut̪i/) and Ôpinihiti (অপিনিহিতি, /opinihit̪i/, epenthesis) are two phonological phenomena that occur in spoken Bengali dialects. Opinihiti refers to the phonological process in which a i or u is pronounced before it occurs in the word. Obhishruti is the sound change in which this shifted i or u becomes removed and changes the preceding vowel. Observe the example above : Koriya (করিয়া, /koria/) > Koirya (কইর‍্যা, /koira/) > Kore (করে, /kore/). First Opinihiti changes Koriya to Koirya (notice how the I changes position.), then Obhishruti changes Koirya (কইর‍্যা) to Kore (করে).
