= Gaudi Prakrit =

Prakrit language of ancient Bengal

- Pronunciation: Gauṛí Prākrit
- Region: Gauda (or ancient Bengal)
- Era: First millennium
- Language family: Indo-European: Indo-Iranian; Indo-Aryan; Gaudi Prakrit
- Early form: Old Eastern Indo-Aryan

Language codes
- ISO 639-3: –
- Glottolog: None

Gaudi Prakrit is the Middle Indo-Aryan Prakrit language used in Gauda or ancient Bengal. The language originates from the Old Eastern Indo-Aryan and is the historical ancestor of Bengali. It was originally considered as Prakrit until 400 AD, later its Apabhraṃśa appeared which is known as Gaudi Apabhransha. Although not sufficiently proven, the existence of the language that predated the Vanga-Kamarupi and Bengali is believed to be descended from it.

Evidence of the presence of Gaudi Prakrit is found in Daṇḍin's Kavyadarsa. A reference to the Gaudí Prakrit exists in this text, written in about the 6th century.

== Etymology ==
The term 'Gaudi Prakrit' is related to a janapada or region and the language spoken in that region. The word Gaudi refers to the Gauda region, while the word Prakrit refers to a spoken form of the Middle Indo-Aryan language. This Prakrit was spoken in Gauda, that is why it is called Gaudi Prakrit.

== Characteristics ==
Most linguists support the view that the Magadhi Prakrit was used in the Bengal region in ancient times and the Bengali language originated from its Apabhraṃśa. However, on the basis of phonological features, there are opposite or opposing views. Bengali has many features that Magadhi Prakrit does not have; which gives a clear indication of the presence of some other Prakrit instead of Magadhi Prakrit.

1. At the first letter of word, য় (অন্তঃস্থ অ ôntôsthô ô) was not used, instead জ (বর্গীয় জ bôrgiyô jô) was used. Similarly জ্জ was used instead of দ্য, র্জ and র্য্য.
2. The ব (বর্গীয় ব bôrgiyô bô) was used as the first letter of the word, and the ôntôsthô bô was the bôrgiyô bô form.

== Bibliography ==
- Shahidullah, Dr. Muhammad (1998). Bangla Vasar Itibritto (in Bengali). Dhaka: Mowla Brothers.
- Ray, Niharranjan (1993). বাঙ্গালীর ইতিহাস: আদি পর্ব Bāṅgālīra itihāsa: Ādiparba [History of Bengalis: Early Phases] (PDF) (in Bengali) (Dey's [3rd] ed.). Kolkata: Dey's Publishing. ISBN 81-7079-270-3.
- Ray, Niharranjan (2022). বাঙ্গালীর ইতিহাস: আদি পর্ব Bāṅgālīra itihāsa: Ādiparba [History of Bengalis: Early Phases] (in Bengali) (Dey's [17th] ed.). Kolkata: Dey's Publishing. ISBN 978-81-295-1977-1.
- Shaw, Dr. Rameswar (21 February 1984). সাধারণ ভাষাবিজ্ঞান ও বাংলা ভাষা (in Bengali). Kolkata: Pustak Bipani. ISBN 81-85471-12-6.
- Bhattacharya, Subhash (2012). ভাষার তত্ত্ব ও বাংলা ভাষা (in Bengali). Kolkata: Bangiya Sahitya Samsad. ISBN 978-93-82012-12-2.
