= Hanif (disambiguation) =

Hanif means a true believer, a righteous person in Arabic. Hanif may also refer to

- Hanif (given name)
- Hanif (surname)
- Hanif, Iran, a village in Iran

== See also ==
- Hanife
