= Hanifa =

Hanifa (حنيفة) is an Arabic given name, the feminine form of Hanif, which means "incline" (to the right religion, i.e. Islam). Notable people with the name include:

== Given name ==
- Hanifa Abdullayev (1923–1991), Azerbaijani hematologist and health minister
- Hanifa Adan (born 1996), Kenyan activist
- Hanifa Ahmad (born 1946), Malay politician
- Hanifa Deen, Australian writer
- Hanifa Mohamed Ibrahim (born 1991), Somali politician
- Hanifa Kawooya (born 1957), Ugandan politician
- Hanifa Malikova (1856–1929), Azerbaijani educationalist
- Hanifa Mavlianova (1924–2010), Soviet and Tajik soprano
- Hanifa Nabukeera, Ugandan businesswoman and politician
- Hanifa Safi (died 2012), Afghan politician
- Hanifah Hajar Taib (born 1972), Malay politician
- Hanifa Yousoufi (born 1995), Afghan mountaineer
- Hanifah Walidah, American rapper and activist

== Surname ==
- Abu Hanifa (699–767), founder of Hanafi school of jurisprudence
- V. M. C. Haneefa (1951–2010), Indian actor

== See also ==
- Hənifə, Azerbaijan
- Hanafi (disambiguation)
- Hanife, name
