= Hanafi (disambiguation) =

The Hanafi school (Arabic: حنفي Ḥanafī) is one of the four schools of Sunni Islamic jurisprudence (Fiqh).

Hanafi, al-Hanafi, or Hanafy may also refer to:

== Name ==
=== Surname ===
- Abdullah Hanafi, Bruneian administrator
- Alam al-Din al-Hanafi (1178–1251), Egyptian mathematician
- Amal Mahmoud Hanafy (born 1978), Egyptian powerlifter
- Amer El-Hanafi (1934–??), Egyptian weightlifter
- Amira Hanafi (born 1979), American/Egyptian poet and artist active in electronic literature
- Farida Hanafi (born 2005), Egyptian-Saudi footballer
- Hassan Hanafi (1935–2021), Egyptian philosophy professor
- Hesham Hanafy (born 1973), Egyptian footballer
- Khadija Al Hanafi, Tunisian footwork music producer
- Mahboob Hanifi (born 1997), Afghan footballer
- Mohamed El-Gohary Hanafy (born 1955), Egyptian basketball player
- Najda ibn Amir al-Hanafi (655–691/92), Arabian Kharijite rebel leader
- Nahema Hanafi (born 1983), French historian
- Sari Hanafi, Syrian-Palestinian sociology professor

=== Given name ===
- Hanafi Akbar (born 1995), Singaporean footballer
- Hanafy Bastan (1922–1995), Egyptian footballer
- Hanafi Moustafa, Egyptian weightlifter

== Other ==
- Hanafi Movement, 1958–1977 African American Muslim movement founded by Hamaas Abdul Khaalis
  - Hanafi Madh-Hab Center, at 7700 16th Street NW, Washington DC; headquarters of the Hanafi Movement
  - 1973 Hanafi Muslim massacre, at the center
  - 1977 Hanafi Siege, by the Hanafi Movement
- Hanafi Mosque of Bourguiba, Tunisia
- Miss Hanafi, 1954 Egyptian comedy film

== See also ==
- Hanifa (disambiguation)
