= Hanifi Rohingya (Unicode block) =

- Range: U+10D00..U+10D3F (64 code points)
- Plane: SMP
- Scripts: Hanifi Rohingya
- Assigned: 50 code points
- Unused: 14 reserved code points

Unicode version history
- 11.0 (2018): 50 (+50)

Unicode documentation
- Code chart ∣ Web page

Hanifi Rohingya is a Unicode block containing characters for Hanifi Rohingya script used for writing the Rohingya language in Myanmar and Bangladesh.

== Block ==
Hanifi Rohingya^{[1]}^{[2]} Official Unicode Consortium code chart (PDF)
	0	1	2	3	4	5	6	7	8	9	A	B	C	D	E	F
U+10D0x	𐴀	𐴁	𐴂	𐴃	𐴄	𐴅	𐴆	𐴇	𐴈	𐴉	𐴊	𐴋	𐴌	𐴍	𐴎	𐴏
U+10D1x	𐴐	𐴑	𐴒	𐴓	𐴔	𐴕	𐴖	𐴗	𐴘	𐴙	𐴚	𐴛	𐴜	𐴝	𐴞	𐴟
U+10D2x	𐴠	𐴡	𐴢	𐴣	𐴤	𐴥	𐴦	𐴧								
U+10D3x	𐴰	𐴱	𐴲	𐴳	𐴴	𐴵	𐴶	𐴷	𐴸	𐴹						
Notes: 1. As of Unicode version 16.0; 2. Grey areas indicate non-assigned code points

== History ==
The following Unicode-related documents record the purpose and process of defining specific characters in the Hanifi Rohingya block:

Version	Final code points (Note: Proposed code points and characters names may differ from final code points and names)	Count	L2 ID	WG2 ID	Document
11.0	U+10D00..10D27, 10D30..10D39	50	L2/12-214	N4283	Pandey, Anshuman (2012-06-20), Preliminary Proposal to Encode the Rohingya Script
11.0	U+10D00..10D27, 10D30..10D39	50	L2/12-267		Anderson, Deborah; McGowan, Rick; Whistler, Ken (2012-07-21), "IX. ROHINGYA", Review of Indic-related documents and Recommendations to the UTC
11.0	U+10D00..10D27, 10D30..10D39	50	L2/13-028		Anderson, Deborah; McGowan, Rick; Whistler, Ken; Pournader, Roozbeh (2013-01-28), "24", Recommendations to UTC on Script Proposals
11.0	U+10D00..10D27, 10D30..10D39	50	L2/15-278R		Pandey, Anshuman (2015-12-31), Proposal to encode the Hanifi Rohingya script in Unicode
11.0	U+10D00..10D27, 10D30..10D39	50	L2/16-037		Anderson, Deborah; Whistler, Ken; McGowan, Rick; Pournader, Roozbeh; Glass, Andrew; Iancu, Laurențiu (2016-01-22), "4. Hanifi Rohingya", Recommendations to UTC #146 January 2016 on Script Proposals
11.0	U+10D00..10D27, 10D30..10D39	50	L2/16-311R	N4813	Pandey, Anshuman (2016-12-31), Revised proposal to encode Hanifi Rohingya
11.0	U+10D00..10D27, 10D30..10D39	50	L2/17-037		Anderson, Deborah; Whistler, Ken; Pournader, Roozbeh; Glass, Andrew; Iancu, Laurențiu; Moore, Lisa; Liang, Hai; Ishida, Richard; Misra, Karan; McGowan, Rick (2017-01-21), "7. Hanifi Rohingya", Recommendations to UTC #150 January 2017 on Script Proposals
11.0	U+10D00..10D27, 10D30..10D39	50	L2/17-016		Moore, Lisa (2017-02-08), "D.10", UTC #150 Minutes
11.0	U+10D00..10D27, 10D30..10D39	50	L2/18-115		Moore, Lisa (2018-05-09), "Consensus 154-C14", UTC #155 Minutes
11.0	U+10D00..10D27, 10D30..10D39	50		N5020 (pdf, doc)	Umamaheswaran, V. S. (2019-01-11), "M67.01", Unconfirmed minutes of WG 2 meeting 67
