= Mohammad Hanif =

Mohammad Hanif may refer to:

- Nassar (actor) (born Muhammad Hanif), Indian actor and director
- Muhamed Haneef (born 1979), Indian physician who was wrongly accused of aiding terrorists
- Mohammad Hanif (clan leader)
- Mohammad Hanif (cricketer), Pakistani cricketer who played for Pakistan Air Force
- Mohammad Hanif (mayor) (died 2006), mayor of Dhaka during 1994 to 2002
- Mohammad Hanif (scholar) (fl. 1980s), inventor of the Hanifi Rohingya script
- Muhammad Hanif (Taliban spokesperson) (died 2008), spokesman for Afghan Taliban
- Muhammad Hanif Qureshi (1877–1938), South Asian Muslim poet
- Mohammed Hanif (born 1964), British Pakistani writer and journalist
- Mohammad Hanif (Iranian writer) (born 1961), Iranian novelist and scholar
- Md. Hanif, Bangladeshi politician

== See also ==
- Hanif Mohammad (1934–2016), Pakistani cricketer
- Hanif Mohammed, Guantanamo Bay detainee
- Hanif
