= Rohingya Arabic alphabet =

Arabic alphabet for the Rohingya language

Rohingya Arabic alphabet رُحَ࣪ڠۡگَ࣪ࢬ عَرࣤبِي لࣦكَ࣪ 𐴌𐴟𐴇𐴥𐴝𐴚𐴒𐴙𐴝 𐴀𐴝𐴌𐴡𐴁𐴞 𐴓𐴠𐴑𐴤𐴝 Ruáingga Arobi leká
- Script type: Abjad
- Period: c. 19 c. to the present
- Direction: Right-to-left
- Languages: Rohingya

Related scripts
- Parent systems: Proto-Sinaitic: Phoenician; Aramaic; Nabataean; Arabic; Perso-Arabic; Urdu; Rohingya Arabic alphabet

The Rohingya Arabic alphabet is a modified Arabic script for the Rohingya language. It is one of three scripts currently used to write the Rohingya language, the other two being the Hanifi Rohingya script and the Rohingya Latin script. Rohingya was first written in the 19th century with a version of the Perso-Arabic script. In 1975, an orthographic Arabic script was developed and approved by the community leaders, based on the Urdu alphabet but with unique innovations to make the script suitable to Rohingya.

In the 1980s, Mohammad Hanif and his colleagues created the suitable phonetic script based on Arabic letters; the Hanifi Rohingya script; it has been compared to the N’ko script. This script has gained popularity among Rohingya speakers, challenging the position of Arabic script, and presenting itself as a uniquely Rohingya script.

Nevertheless, as most Rohingya children attend Arabic and Quranic classes and are intimately familiar with the Arabic script, Rohingya Arabic script remains suitable and relevant for Rohingya language. Tests that have been conducted suggest that this script can be learned in a matter of hours if the reader has learned Arabic in a madrassa.

One of the most significant advocates of Rohingya Arabic script has been Kyaw Hla Aung, a world-renowned Rohingya lawyer and civil rights activist.

One of the most important features of Rohingya Arabic alphabet, a feature which makes this script unique among other adaptions of the Arabic script, is tone markers. Another feature of Rohingya Arabic script is that unlike its parent systems, Persian and Urdu, vowel diacritics are essential for writing in Rohingya. Whereas Persian and Urdu use three diacritics (rarely written) as well as three letters to represent their 6 vowel sounds, Rohingya has been modified to eliminate the reliance on such a dual system, instead solely relying on diacritics. In doing so, 3 new diacritics have been introduced to Rohingya, which are "curly" versions of the three existing diacritics.

== Alphabet ==
=== Letters ===
Rohingya Arabic script consists of 40 letters, of which 36 are from its parent systems, Arabic, Persian, and Urdu alphabets. 4 are new characters unique to Rohingya. These new consonants represent consonants that undergo fusion with a consonant preceding them. 10 of these letters are exclusively used in writing of loanwords from Arabic or from European languages.

Letters in yellow boxes are solely used in loanwords. Letters in green boxes are uniquely Rohingya.

Primary Letters of Rohingya Arabic alphabet
Name	Forms				Sound represented	Latin equivalent	Hanifi equivalent	Notes
Name	Isolated	Final	Medial	Initial	Sound represented	Latin equivalent	Hanifi equivalent	Notes
𐴀𐴝𐴓𐴞𐴉 اَلِف alif	ا	ـا			/ʔ/	-	𐴀	Pronounced as /ʔ/. Acts as a carrier of vowel diacritic in the beginning of words that start with a vowel sound
𐴁𐴠 بࣦ be	ب	ـب	ـبـ	بـ	/b/	b	𐴁	
𐴂𐴠 پࣦ pe	پ	ـپ	ـپـ	پـ	/p/	p	𐴂	
𐴃𐴠 تࣦ te	ت	ـت	ـتـ	تـ	/t/	t	𐴃	
𐴄𐴝 ٹَ tha	ٹ	ـٹ	ـٹـ	ٹـ	/ʈ/	th	𐴄	
𐴃𐴃𐴠 ثࣦ tse	ث	ـث	ـثـ	ثـ	/ts ~ θ/	ts	𐴃𐴃	Only used in loanwords of Arabic origin
𐴅𐴞𐴔 جِيۡم jim	ج	ـج	ـجـ	جـ	/ɟ/	j	𐴅	
𐴆𐴞𐴔 چِيۡم chim	چ	ـچ	ـچـ	چـ	/c/	ch	𐴆	
𐴇𐴠 حࣦ he	ح	ـح	ـحـ	حـ	/h/	h	𐴇	
𐴈𐴠 خࣦ khe	خ	ـخ	ـخـ	خـ	/h ~ x/	h, kh	𐴈	
𐴊𐴝𐴓 دَل dal	د	ـد			/d/	d	𐴊	
𐴋𐴝𐴓 ڈَل dhal	ڈ	ـڈ			/ɖ/	dh	𐴋	
𐴎𐴝𐴓 ذَل zal	ذ	ـذ			/z/	z	𐴎	Only used in loanwords of Arabic origin
𐴌𐴠 رࣦ re	ر	ـر			/ɾ/	r	𐴌	
بࣤٹِࢬ رࣦ bottya re	ࢪ	ـࢪ			/ɽ/	r	𐴌	Unique to Rohingya. Cannot occur at beginning of words. Inextricably merged as a single sound with the preceding consonant when pronounced. Example: ٹࣦلِ࣭گَ࣪ࢪفۡ (teligráf, 𐴃𐴠𐴓𐴞𐴒𐴝𐴌𐴝𐴉𐴢) [t̪ɛ.lɪ.ˈgɾɑf] (meaning telegraph)
𐴍𐴝 ڑَ ça	ڑ	ـڑ			/ɽ/	ç	𐴍	
𐴎𐴠 زࣦ ze	ز	ـز			/z/	z	𐴎	
𐴏𐴞𐴕 سِين sin	س	ـس	ـسـ	سـ	/s/	s	𐴏	
𐴐𐴞𐴕 شِين cin	ش	ـش	ـشـ	شـ	/ʃ/	c	𐴐	
𐴏𐴝𐴊 صَد sad	ص	ـص	ـصـ	صـ	/s/	s	𐴏	Only used in loanwords of Arabic origin
𐴊𐴝𐴊 ضَد dad	ض	ـض	ـضـ	ضـ	/d/	d	𐴊	Only used in loanwords of Arabic origin
𐴃𐴝𐴀𐴠 طَاࣦ tae	ط	ـط	ـطـ	طـ	/t/	t	𐴃	Only used in loanwords of Arabic origin
𐴎𐴝𐴀𐴠 ظَاࣦ zae	ظ	ـظ	ـظـ	ظـ	/t/	z	𐴎	Only used in loanwords of Arabic origin
𐴀𐴠𐴕 عࣦين en	ع	ـع	ـعـ	عـ	/ʔ/	-	𐴀	Only used in loanwords of Arabic origin
𐴒𐴠𐴕 غࣦين gen	غ	ـغ	ـغـ	غـ	//g ~ ɣ/	g	𐴒	Only used in loanwords of Arabic origin
𐴚𐴝 ڠَ nga	ڠ	ـڠ	ـڠـ	-	/ŋ/	ng	𐴚	Also found in Jawi script. Cannot occur at beginning of words.
𐴉𐴝 فَ fa	ف	ـف	ـفـ	فـ	/f/	f	𐴉	
𐴜𐴝 ڤَ va	ڤ	ـڤ	ـڤـ	ڤـ	/v/	v	𐴜	Only used in loanwords of European origin
𐴑𐴝𐴝 قَف kaf	ق	ـق	ـقـ	قـ	/k ~ q/	k	𐴑	Only used in loanwords of Arabic origin
𐴑𐴝𐴝 كَف kaf	ك	ـك	ـكـ	كـ	/k/	k	𐴑	
𐴒𐴝𐴝 گَف gaf	گ	ـگ	ـگـ	گـ	/g/	g	𐴒	
𐴓𐴝𐴔 لَم lam	ل	ـل	ـلـ	لـ	/l/	l	𐴓	
𐴔𐴞𐴔 مِيم mim	م	ـم	ـمـ	مـ	/m/	m	𐴔	
𐴕𐴟𐴕 نُون nun	ن	ـن	ـنـ	نـ	/n ~ ɳ/	n	𐴕	
شۤ࣪نۡزُكۡ نَگَ نُون cóñzuk naga nun	ں	ـں	ـنـ	-	/◌̃/	ñ	𐴕	Cannot occur at beginning of words. Alternatively, postnasalized (double) vowel diacritics can be used. Example: شِ࣭يَ࣪اں (cíyañ, 𐴐𐴠𐴥𐴛𐴝) [ʃĩ.ˈjã] (meaning horn, shofar)
𐴖𐴢𐴖 وَاو vav	و	ـو			/ʋ, v/	v	𐴖	
بࣤٹِࢬ وَاو bottya vav	ࢫ	ـࢫ			/w/	w	𐴖	Unique to Rohingya. Inextricably merged as a single sound with the preceding consonant when pronounced. Example: تࣤلَّࢫ (tollwa, 𐴃𐴡𐴓𐴧𐴗𐴝) [ˈt̪ɑl.lu͡ɑ] (meaning dependent)
𐴇𐴠 هࣦ he	ه	ـه	ـهـ	هـ	/h/	h	𐴇	
𐴘𐴝 يَ ya	ي	ـي	ـيـ	يـ	/j/	y	𐴘	
بࣤٹِࢬ يَ bottya ya	ࢬ	ـࢬ			/j/	y	𐴘	Unique to Rohingya. Does not come after letters with no medial form (non-joinders, such as د, ر, و); Inextricably merged as a single sound with the preceding consonant when pronounced. Example: رُحَ࣪ڠۡگَ࣪ࢬ (Ruáingga, 𐴓𐴠𐴑𐴤𐴝) [ˈɾo.ɪŋ.ˌgʲa] (meaning Rohingya)

=== Vowel Diacritics ===
The purpose of vowel diacritics in an Abjad script is to give vowels to each consonants. Unlike parent system, Persian and Urdu, Rohingya cannot be written or read without diacritics. The shape and position of diacritic is very important. There are 7 diacritics in Rohingya Arabic alphabet, which include the Sukun diacritic (zero-vowel), the 3 diacritics inherited from Arabic, representing sounds /a/, /i/, and /u/, as well as three new diacritics unique to Rohingya, representing vowel sounds /ɔ~ɑ/, /e/, and /o/. All of these diacritics represent short vowel sounds.

6 Tanween (double) diacrictics are also used to represent the post-nasalized versions of the 6 vowel sounds. Alternatively, a "ں, ـں, ـنـ" (dotless "n") can be used as well.

Tashdid (◌ّ) diacritic is used for gemination (doubling of consonant).

Vowel diacritics in Rohingya Arabic alphabet
Short Vowels							
-a	-o	-i	-e	-u	-ou	Sukun (Zero-vowel)	Tashdid (Gemination)
ـ𐴝	ـ𐴡	ـ𐴞	ـ𐴠	ـ𐴟	ـ𐴡	Sukun (Zero-vowel)	◌𐴧
◌َ	◌ࣤ	◌ِ	◌ࣦ	◌ُ	◌ࣥ	◌ۡ	◌ّ
Postnasalized Vowels
◌ً	◌ࣤ	◌ٍ	◌ࣦ	◌ࣱ	◌ࣨ		

When a syllable starts with a vowel, be it the first syllable of the word, or a syllable in the middle of the word, the letter alif is used as vowel carrier. Examples include:

- اَكُوَشَّ (အကုအာဣစ္စာ, akuaicca, 𐴀𐴝𐴑𐴟𐴖𐴝𐴙𐴐𐴧𐴝) [ɑ.ku.ˈwəʃ.ˌʃʲə] (meaning inconvenient, difficult)
- بࣦاَرَمۡ (ဘီအာရာမ်, biaram, 𐴁𐴞𐴘𐴝𐴌𐴝𐴔) [ˈbi.jɑ.ɾɑm] (meaning illness)

=== Tone markers ===
Rohingya is a tonal language. Historically Arabic script has been adopted and used by many tonal languages, examples include Xiao'erjing for Mandarin Chinese as well as Ajami script adopted for writing various languages of Western Africa. However, one of the shortcomings of Arabic, especially in comparison to Latin-derived scrips or other indigenous writing systems was that Arabic did not have a way of indicating tones.

However, in the adoption of the Arabic Script for Rohingya language, in a unique modification, tone markers have been introduced to the Arabic script. Three (3) tone markers have been developed and are used in Rohingya.

Tone markers act as "modifiers" of vowel diacritics. In simpler words, they are "diacritics for the diacritics". They are written "outside" of the word, meaning that they are written above the vowel diacritic if the diacritic is written above the word, and they are written below the diacritic if the diacritic is written below the word. They are only ever written where there are vowel diacritics. This is important to note, as without the diacritic present, there is no way to distinguish between tone markers and I‘jām i.e. dots that are used for purpose of phonetic distinctions of consonants.

◌࣪ / ◌࣭

The Hārbāy (represented with diacritic ◌𐴤 in Hanifi script, and with an acute accent ◌́/á in Latin): a single dot that's placed on top of Fatḥah and Ḍammah, or curly Fatḥah and curly Ḍammah (vowel diacritics unique to Rohinghya), or their respective Fatḥatan and Ḍammatan versions, and it's placed underneath Kasrah or curly Kasrah, or their respective Kasratan version. (e.g. دً࣪ / دٌ࣪ / دࣨ࣪ / دٍ࣭) This tone marker indicates a short high tone (/˥/).

◌࣫ / ◌࣮

The Ṭelā (represented with diacritic ◌𐴥 in Hanifi script, and with double vowels with acute accent on the first; ◌́◌/áa in Latin):, is two dots that are placed on top of Fatḥah and Ḍammah, or curly Fatḥah and curly Ḍammah, or their respective Fatḥatan and Ḍammatan versions, and it's placed underneath Kasrah or curly Kasrah, or their respective Kasratan version. (e.g. دَ࣫ / دُ࣫ / دِ࣮) This tone marker indicates a long falling tone (/˥˩/).

◌࣬ / ◌࣯

The Ṭāna (represented with diacritic ◌𐴦 in Hanifi script, and with double vowels with acute accent on the first; ◌◌́/aá in Latin), is a fish-like looping line that is placed on top of Fatḥah and Ḍammah, or curly Fatḥah and curly Ḍammah, or their respective Fatḥatan and Ḍammatan versions, and it's placed underneath Kasrah or curly Kasrah, or their respective Kasratan version. (e.g. دࣤ࣬ / دࣥ࣬ / دࣦ࣯) This tone marker indicates a long rising tone (/˨˦/).

=== Diacritic Chart ===
Vowel at the beginning of syllable
A	O	I	E	U	Ou
𐴀𐴝	𐴀𐴡	𐴀𐴞	𐴀𐴠	𐴀𐴟	𐴀𐴡
اَ	اࣤ	اِ	اࣦ	اُ	اࣥ
Vowel following a consonant, no tone
Sa	So	Si	Se	Su	Sou
𐴏𐴝	𐴏𐴡	𐴏𐴞	𐴏𐴠	𐴏𐴟	𐴏𐴡
سَـ / سَ	سࣤـ / سࣤ	سِـ / سِ	سࣦـ / سࣦ	سُـ / سُ	سࣥـ / سࣥ
Vowel following a consonant, Short high tone /˥/
Sá	Sό	Sí	Sé	Sú	Sόu
𐴏𐴝𐴤	𐴏𐴡𐴤	𐴏𐴞𐴤	𐴏𐴠𐴤	𐴏𐴟𐴤	𐴏𐴡𐴤
سَ࣪ـ / سَ࣪	سࣤ࣪ـ / سࣤ࣪	سِ࣭ـ / سِ࣭	سࣦ࣭ـ / سࣦ࣭	سُ࣪ـ / سُ࣪	سࣥ࣪ـ / سࣥ࣪
Vowel following a consonant, Long falling tone /˥˩/
Sáa	Sόo	Síi	Sée	Súu	Sόou
𐴏𐴝𐴥	𐴏𐴡𐴥	𐴏𐴞𐴥	𐴏𐴠𐴥	𐴏𐴟𐴥	𐴏𐴡𐴥
سَ࣫ـ / سَ࣫	سࣤ࣫ـ / سࣤ࣫	سِ࣮ـ / سِ࣮	سࣦ࣮ـ / سࣦ࣮	سُ࣫ـ / سُ࣫	سࣥ࣫ـ / سࣥ࣫
Vowel following a consonant, Long rising tone /˨˦/
Saá	Soό	Sií	Seé	Suú	Soόu
𐴏𐴝𐴦	𐴏𐴡𐴦	𐴏𐴞𐴦	𐴏𐴠𐴦	𐴏𐴟𐴦	𐴏𐴡𐴦
سَ࣬ـ / سَ࣬	سࣤ࣬ـ / سࣤ࣬	سِ࣯ـ / سِ࣯	سࣦ࣯ـ / سࣦ࣯	سُ࣬ـ / سُ࣬	سࣥ࣬ـ / سࣥ࣬

== Sample text ==
The following is a sample text in Rohingya of Article 1 of the Universal Declaration of Human Rights with English, contrasted with versions of the text in Bengali and Assamese.

Rohingya in Rohingya Arabic Script	مَنُ࣪شۡ بࣦگُّ࣪نۡ اَزَدۡ حِ࣭سَفࣦ، اَرۡ عِزّࣤتۡ اَرۡدࣦ حࣤ࣪قۡ اࣤ࣪كّࣤلۡ اࣤ࣪تۡ، فُ࣪وَ࣪نَّ࣪ࢬ حِ࣭سَفࣦ فࣤيۡدَ اࣤ࣪يّࣦ۔ فࣤتِّ اِنۡسَ࣪نۡ اࣤ࣪تُّ هࣤنࣤ࣪ فࣤرࣤ࣪كۡ سَ࣪رَ࣪ عࣦلَنۡ اࣤتۡ اَسࣦ࣭دࣦ تَمَ࣪مۡ حࣤ࣪قۡ اࣤ࣪كّࣤلۡ اَرۡدࣦ اَزَدِ اࣤ࣪كّࣤلۡ لࣤيۡ فَ࣫يۡدَ࣪ گࣤرࣤ࣫نۡ اࣤ࣪رۡ حࣤ࣪قۡ اَسࣦ࣭۔ اَرۡ، تَرَ࣪رࣦ࣭ دِلۡ اَرۡدࣦ دࣦمَكۡ دِيࣦ࣭۔ اࣤ࣪تࣤ࣪لَّ، تَرَ࣪تُّ࣪ اࣦك زࣤنۡ لࣤيۡ اَرۡ اࣦكۡزࣤنۡ بَ࣪يۡ حِ࣭سَفࣦ مَامَلَ گࣤرࣤ࣫نۡ سَ࣬۔
Rohingya in Hanifi Script	𐴔𐴝𐴕𐴟𐴤𐴞𐴐 𐴁𐴠𐴒𐴧𐴟𐴤𐴕 𐴝𐴎𐴝𐴊 𐴇𐴞𐴤𐴏𐴝𐴉𐴠,. 𐴝𐴌 𐴞𐴎𐴧𐴡𐴃𐴝𐴌𐴊𐴠 𐴇𐴡𐴤𐴑 𐴡𐴤𐴑𐴧𐴡𐴓 𐴡𐴤𐴃, 𐴉𐴟𐴤𐴝𐴞𐴕𐴧𐴝 𐴇𐴞𐴤𐴏𐴝𐴉𐴠 𐴉𐴡𐴞𐴊𐴝 𐴡𐴤𐴞𐴘𐴠. 𐴉𐴡𐴃𐴧𐴞𐴤 𐴞𐴕𐴏𐴝𐴤𐴕 𐴡𐴤𐴃𐴧𐴟 𐴇𐴡𐴕𐴡𐴤 𐴉𐴡𐴌𐴡𐴤𐴑. 𐴏𐴝𐴤𐴌𐴝 𐴠𐴓𐴝𐴕 𐴡𐴃 𐴀𐴏𐴠𐴤𐴊𐴠 𐴃𐴝𐴔𐴝𐴤𐴔 𐴇𐴡𐴤𐴑 𐴡𐴤𐴑𐴧𐴡𐴓 𐴝𐴌𐴊𐴠 𐴝𐴎𐴝𐴊𐴞 𐴡𐴤𐴑𐴧𐴡𐴓 𐴓𐴡𐴞 𐴉𐴝𐴥𐴞𐴊𐴝 𐴒𐴡𐴌𐴡𐴥𐴕 𐴡𐴤𐴌 𐴇𐴡𐴤𐴑 𐴝𐴌, 𐴃𐴝𐴌𐴝𐴤𐴌𐴠, 𐴊𐴞𐴓 𐴝𐴌𐴊𐴠 𐴊𐴠𐴔𐴝𐴑 𐴊𐴞𐴘𐴠𐴤. 𐴡𐴤𐴃𐴡𐴓𐴧𐴝, 𐴃𐴝𐴌𐴝𐴤𐴃𐴧𐴟 𐴠𐴑𐴎𐴡𐴕 𐴓𐴡𐴞. 𐴝𐴌𐴠𐴑𐴎𐴡𐴕 𐴁𐴝𐴤𐴞 𐴇𐴞𐴤𐴏𐴝𐴉𐴠 𐴔𐴝𐴧𐴔𐴠𐴓𐴝 𐴒𐴡𐴌𐴡𐴥𐴕 𐴏𐴝𐴦.
Rohingya in Rohingya Latin alphabet	Manúic beggún azad hísafe, ar izzot arde hók ókkol ót, fúainna hísafe foida óiye. Fottí insán óttu honó forók sára elan ot aséde tamám hók ókkol arde azadi ókkol loi fáaida goróon ór hók asé. Ar, taráre dil arde demak diyé. Ótolla, taráttu ekzon loi arekzon bái hísafe maamela goróon saá.
Rohingya in Burmese Rohingya alphabet	မနုဣစ ဘေဂ္ဂုန အာဇဒ ဟိသာဖဟေ၊ အာရ ဣဇ္ဇောတ အာရဒေ ဟောက ဩကောလ ဩတ၊ ဖဟုအာဣန္နာ ဟိသာဖဟေ ဖဟောဣဒါ ဩဣယေ။ ဖဟောတ္တိ ဣနသာန ဩတ္တု ဟောနေဋ ဖဟောရောက သာရာ ဧလာန ဩတ အာသေဒေ တာမာမ ဟောက ဩက္ကောလ အာရဒေ အာဇာဒိ ဩက္ကောလ လောဣ ဖဟာအာဣဒါ ဂေါရောဩန ဩရ ဟောက အာသေ။ အာရ၊ တာရာရေ ဒိလ အာရဒေ ဒေမာက ဒိယေ။ ဩတောလ္လာ၊ တာရာတ္တု ဧကဇောန လောဣ အာရေကဇောန ဘာဣ ဟိသာဖဟေ မာအာမေလာ ဂေါရောဩန သာအာ။
English	All human beings are born free and equal in dignity and rights. They are endowed with reason and conscience and should act towards one another in a spirit of brotherhood.
