= Hanif (given name) =

- Gender: Male
- Language: Arabic, Aramaic

Origin
- Origin: uncertain
- Meaning: 1. righteous, upright; 2. true believer
- Region of origin: Middle East

Other names
- Alternative spelling: Haneef
- Cognate: hanpe
- Derivatives: Feminine; Hanifa

Hanif (Arabic: حنيف, Hebrew: חניף) is an Arabic masculine given name, which means a righteous person or a true believer. The origin of the word is uncertain, although it is generally agreed that it is derived from the Classical Syriac ܚܢܦܐ (ḥanpā, “pagan, impious”).

== Etymology ==
It is generally agreed that the word Ḥanīf (plural: ḥunafā') is derived from the Classical Syriac ܚܢܦܐ (ḥanpā, “pagan, impious”). However, there is no credible theory which can explain the transformation of the term's meaning – from heathen to monotheist. Nabataeans used Hanif's cognate to designate a follower of Hellenized religion. And Nabataean is generally considered as the region where the transformation of the term's meaning took place.

Alfred Felix Landon Beeston argues that the ambiguity associated with the shift of the term's meaning can be largely removed if one assumes that the term was introduced via Najran, instead of its direct introduction from Syria. He argues that the Najranites had adopted the term hanpe from the Syrian missionaries, who used it for all non-Christians, irrespective of them being polytheist or monotheist. The 5th century inhabitants of Mecca had strong trading ties with the Yemen, where the wealthier classes were overwhelmingly monotheist. And, as the Najranites used the term Ḥanīf to designate the Yemenis, it would have been easier for the Meccans to adopt it in the sense of monotheism.

== Notable people ==
Notable people with the given name Hanif include:

- Hanif Abbasi (born 1966), Pakistani politician and businessman
- Hanif Awan (born 1952), Pakistani politician
- Hanif Baktash (1961–2011), Pashto poet and writer
- Hanif Bali (born 1987), Swedish-Iranian politician
- Hanif Dzahir (born 1994), Malaysian footballer
- Hanif Hamir (born 1997), Bruneian footballer
- Hanif Kara (born 1958), British structural engineer
- Hanif Khan (born 1959), Pakistani field hockey player
- Hanif Khan Pitafi, Pakistani politician
- Hanif Kureishi (born 1954), British author, playwright, and filmmaker
- Hanif Kureshi (1982–2024), Indian artist

Indian artist, designer, and advertising professional

- Hanif Lalani (born 1962), British business executive
- Hanif Mohammad (1934–2016), Pakistani cricketer
- Hanif Omranzadeh (born 1985), Iranian footballer
- Hanif Pashteen (born 1992), Pashtun human rights activist
- Hanif Ramay (1930–2006), Pakistani politician
- Hanif Sanket (born 1958), Bangladeshi television host
- Hanif Shah al-Hussaini, Afghan politician
- Hanif-ur-Rehman (born 1976), Pakistani cricketer
- Hanif Willis-Abdurraqib (born 1983), American poet and music critic
- Muhammad Hanif Dhakiri (born 1972), 26th Minister of Manpower of Indonesia

== See also ==
- Hanif
- Hanifa (disambiguation)
