= Peace Kusasira =

Ugandan politician (born 1962)

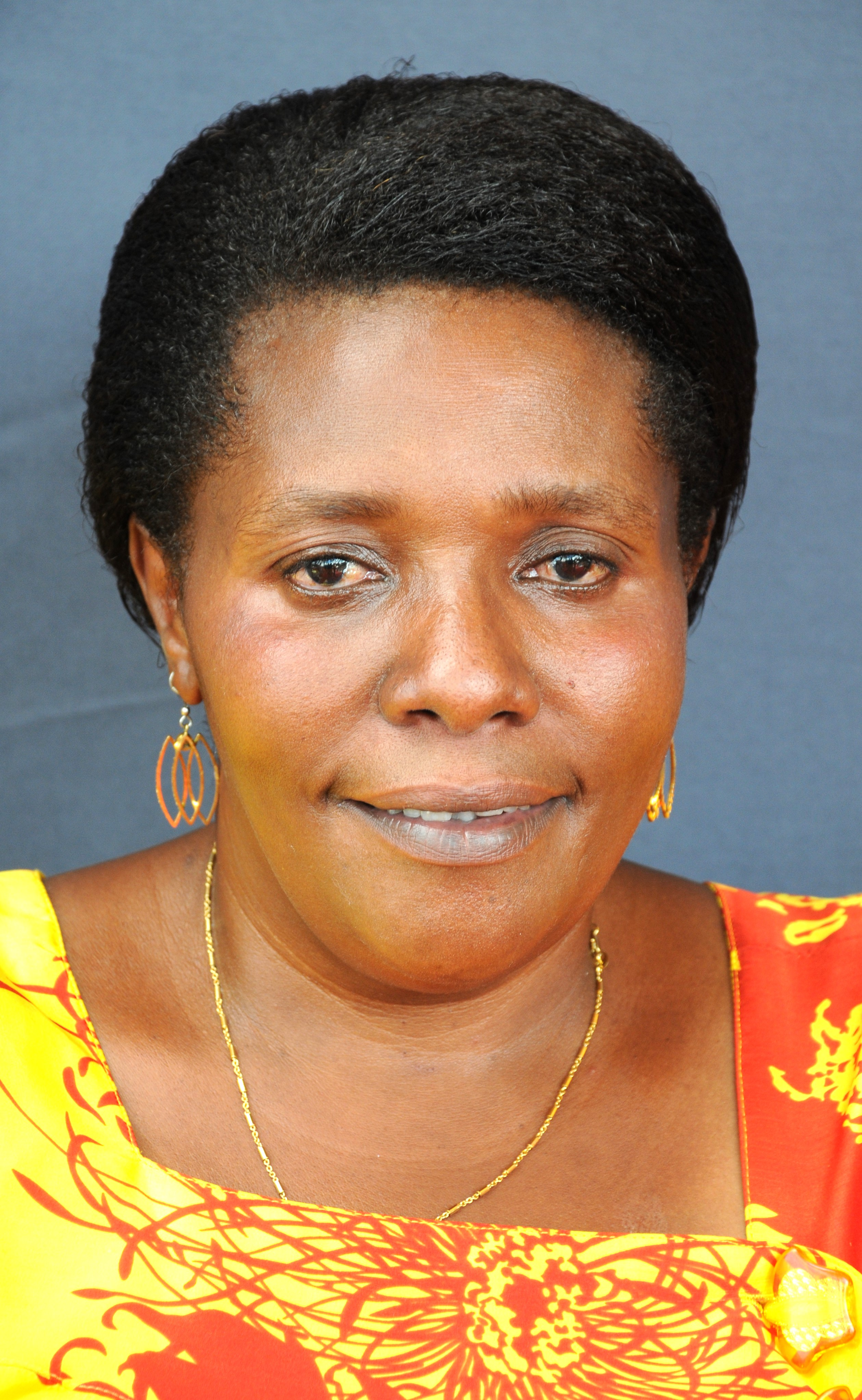
- Born: 27 February 1962 (age 64)
- Other name: Kanyesigye Mubiru
- Citizenship: Ugandan
- Education: Bugamba Boys Primary School; Bweranyangi Girls S.S; St Mary's Namagunga S.S; Makerere University
- Occupations: Politician and Social Worker
- Employer(s): PAPCO Industries, Jinja; National Organization of Trade Unions; Pasip Tribute Junior School; Parliament of Uganda
- Known for: Politics
- Political party: National Resistance Movement
- Spouse: Mubiru Kusasira

Peace Kusasira also referred to as Kusasira Peace Kanyesigye Mubiru (born 27 February 1962) is a female Ugandan politician and social worker. She was the district woman representative of Mukono District in the 9th and 10th parliament of Uganda under the National Resistance Movement political party. She later lost in the 2021 general elections. In the ninth parliament, Peace Kusasira, took the seat from outgoing MP, Margaret Nalugo (who moved to Mukono South and lost to Bakaluba Mukasa).

== Early life and education ==
Kusasira was born on 27 February 1962. In 1975, she completed her Primary Leaving Examinations from Bugamba Boys Primary School.

In 1980, she joined Bweranyangi Girls S.S for Uganda Certificate of Education.

In 1982, she obtained Uganda Advanced Certificate of Education from St Mary's Namagunga S.S and later joined Makerere University for Bachelor of Social Work and Social Administration in 1986.

== Career ==
Between 1986 and 1989, she was the Personnel Administrator at PAPCO Industries, Jinja.

From 1992 to 2000, she was employed as the Director for Women and Youth at National Organization of Trade Unions.

From 2001 to 2011, she was the Director at Pasip Tribute Junior School.

== Political career ==
From 2011 to 2021, she was the Member of Parliament at the Parliament of Uganda.

She served on additional role as the Member on Committee on HIV/AIDS & Related Disease and Committee on Agriculture. She sits on the UWOPA Round Table Committees.

== Personal life ==
She is married to Mubiru Kusasira with three children. Her hobbies are listening to religious music and farming. She has special interests in mobilizing people for poverty eradication.

== See also ==
- List of members of the tenth Parliament of Uganda
- National Resistance Movement
- Hanifa Nabukeera
- List of members of the ninth Parliament of Uganda
- Mukono District
- Parliament of Uganda
