= Hanif (surname) =

Hanif means a true believer, a righteous person in Arabic. It is the surname of the following people:

- Aamer Hanif (born 1967), Pakistani cricketer
- Abdullah Hanif (born 1982), Emirati cricketer
- Adil Hanif (born 1978), Pakistani-born Bahraini cricketer
- Mohammad Hanif (disambiguation)
- Mohammed Hanif (born 1964), British Pakistani writer and journalist
- Mohd Ikhmil Fawedz Mohd Hanif (born 1974), long-distance swimmer
- Rashid Hanif, Bangladeshi cricketer
- Saqib Hanif, Pakistani football player
