= Rohingya language =

Eastern Indo-Aryan language

Rohingya
- 𐴌𐴟𐴇𐴝𐴙𐴚𐴒𐴙𐴝; رُحانغيه; Ruáingga; روھنگيا
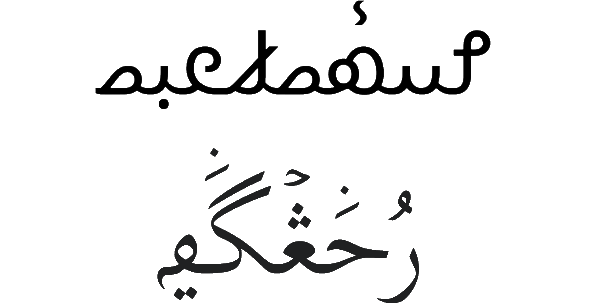
- The word "Rohingya" written in the Hanifi and Arabic scripts
- Pronunciation: [ruˈaiŋɡ(j)a]
- Native to: Myanmar and Bangladesh
- Region: Chittagong and Rakhine State
- Ethnicity: Rohingya
- Native speakers: 3.2 million (2018–2019)
- Language family: Indo-European: Indo-Iranian; Indo-Aryan; Eastern; Bengali–Assamese; Rohingya
- Writing system: Hanifi Rohingya; Bengali script; Latin (Rohingyalish); Burmese; Perso-Arabic (Rohingya Arabic Alphabet) (rare/dubious)

Language codes
- ISO 639-3: rhg
- Glottolog: rohi1238

Rohingya (رُحَ࣪ڠۡگَ࣪ـࢬ, رُحانغيه, روھنگيا Ruáingga, [ruˈaiŋɡ(j)a]) (Note: In English: /roʊˈɪndʒə, -hɪn-, -ɪŋjə/) is an Indo-Aryan language belonging to the Indo-Iranian branch of the Indo-European language family, spoken primarily by the Rohingya people, who are from Rakhine State of Myanmar. It is an Eastern Indo-Aryan language belonging to the Bengali–Assamese branch, and is closely related to the Chittagonian language spoken in neighbouring Bangladesh. The Rohingya, Chakma, Noakhali and Chittagonian languages have a high degree of mutual intelligibility.

== Phonology ==
=== Consonants ===
Rohingya has primarily the following 25 native consonant phonemes. There are some other consonant phonemes which are from foreign languages such as Arabic, Bengali, Burmese and Urdu.

Rohingya consonants
		Labial	Dental/ Alveolar	Retroflex	Palatal	Velar	Glottal
Plosive	voiceless	p	t	ʈ	tʃ	k	ʔ
Plosive	voiced	b	d	ɖ	dʒ	ɡ	
Nasal		m	n	(ɳ)	ɲ	ŋ	
Fricative	voiceless	f	s		ʃ	x	h
Fricative	voiced	(v)	z				
Flap			ɾ	ɽ			
Approximant	median	w			j		
Approximant	lateral		l				

- A dental fricative [θ] may also be heard in words of Arabic origin.
- [v] is only used in words of foreign origin.
- /n/ is heard as [ɳ] when preceding /ʈ, ɖ/.
- Allophones of /k, ɡ/ can be heard as [c, ɟ].

=== Vowels ===
1st analysis
	Front	Back
Close	i	u
Close-mid	e	o
Open-mid	e	ɔ
Open	a	

2nd analysis
	Front	Back
Close	i	u
Mid	e	ɔ
Open		ɑ

- Short allophones of /e, a/ are heard as [ɛ, æ], [ʌ, ə]. Allophones of /i, u/ are heard as [ɪ, ʊ].

There are six vowels and several diphthongs in the Rohingya language. They contrast between "open-o" ([ɔ]) and "closed-o" ([o]) by using the different spellings ⟨o⟩/⟨ó⟩ and ⟨ou⟩/⟨óu⟩ respectively. According to another, [o] is interpreted instead as a diphthong [ɔu], leaving only 5 vowels.

=== Tones ===
Accented vowels, marked with an acute accent, represent stressed (or "hard" vowels), and repeating a vowel lengthens it. Thus, tonals are marked by arranging the location of a stressed vowel in a lengthened pair, like ⟨aá⟩ and ⟨áa⟩.

== Grammar ==
=== Definite articles ===
1. If a noun ends with a vowel then the article is either an or wa if singular, or un or in if plural or uncountable.
Usually wa is used for round-fatty objects, and an for flat-thin objects.

singular		plural	
Kéti án	(the farm)	Kéti ún/ín	(the farms)
Fothú án	(the photo)	Fothú ún/ín	(the photo)
Fata wá	(the leaf)	Fata ún/ín	(the leaves)
Boro wá	(the large tree)	Boro ún/ín	(the large trees)
		Lou ún/ín	(the blood)

2. If a noun ends with a consonant then the article is the end-consonant plus án or wá for singular or ún or ín for plural.

Debal lán	(the wall)	Debal lún/lín	(the walls)
Mes sán	(the table)	Mes sún/sín	(the tables)
Kitap pwá	(the book)	Kitap pún/pín	(the books)
Manúic cwá	(the man)	Manúic cún/cín	(the men)

3. If a noun ends with r, then the article is g plus án or wá for singular or ún or ín for plural.
gún is used for human and gín for non-human.

Tar gán	(the wire)	Tar gún/gín	(the wires)
Duar gán	(the door)	Duar gún/gín	(the doors)
Kuñir gwá	(the dog)	Kuñir gún/gín	(the dogs)
Faár gwá	(the mountain)	Faár gún/gín	(the mountains)

=== Indefinite articles ===
Indefinite articles can be used either before or after the noun. Uggwá usually is used for roll/round/fatty shaped objects and ekkán is for thin/flat shaped objects.

singular		plural	
Uggwá fata	(a leaf)	Hodún fata	(some leaves)
Ekkán fothú	(a picture)	Hodún Fothú	(some pictures)
-or-		-or-	
Fata uggwá	(a leaf)	Fata hodún	(some leaves)
Fothú ekkán	(a picture)	Fothú hodún	(some pictures)

=== Word order ===
Rohingya word order-1 is Subject–Object–Verb.

Añí bát hái
I rice eat.

Ite TV saá
He TV watches.

Ibá sairkél soré
She bicycle rides.

Itará {ham ot} za
They {to work} go.

Rohingya word order-2 is Subject–Time-Place-Object–Verb.

Ibá beínna {gór ot} bát há
She {in the morning} {at home} rice eat.

Tará biale {duan ot} TV saá
They {at night} {at shop} TV watches.

Ite {sair gwá báze} {hál hañsat} sairkél soré
He {at 4pm} {at seaside} bicycle rides.

Ítara {nowá báze} {ofís ot} {ham ot} zaa
They {at 9 o'clock} {to office} {to work} go.

Rohingya word order-3 is Subject–Time-[adjective]-Place-Object–[adverb]-Verb.

Tuñí aijja noya {eskul ot} toratori/toratorigorí paathi goró.
Subject Time [Adjective] Place [Adverb] Object Verb
You today new {at school} quickly party make.

Rohingya word order-4 is Subject–Time-[adjective]-Place-Object–[adverb]-Verb_1-Verb_2.

Tuñí aijja noya {eskul ot} toratori/toratorigorí paathi goittóu modot-goró.
Subject Time [Adjective] Place [Adverb] Object Verb_1 Verb_2
You today new {at school} quickly party help {to make}.
You help to make party quickly at new school today.

More on Time extension:

1. Aijja Januari 24 tarík ót, cón 2017 beínna 4 gwá báze 15 miníth 5 sekén ót.
  Today January dated 24, year 2017 in the morning at 4 o'clock 15 minutes 5 second.
2. Hailla Januari 30 tarík ót, cón 2017 ázinna 5 swá báze 25 minith 7 sekén ót.
  Tomorrow January dated 30, year 2017 in the evening at 5 o'clock 25 minutes 7 second.
3. Goto hailla Oktubor 10 tarík ót, cón 2018 rait or 10 cwá báze 35 miníth 50 sekén ot.
  Yesterday October dated 10, year 2018 in the night at 10 o'clock 35 minutes 50 second.

=== Tenses ===
Rohingya distinguishes 3 tenses and 4 aspects, as shown in the examples below. In these tenses, the helping verb félai shows perfect action (comparable to English "has/have") and félaat shows perfect continuous action (compare English "has/have been"). The helping verb táki and táikki are comparable to English "be" and "been".

Verb-form-suffix (basic and/or helping verb) indicate both person and tense. The suffixes ~ir, ~yi, ~lám, ~youm are used for the first person, the suffixes ~or, ~yó, ~lá, ~bá for the 2nd person, and the suffixes ~ar, ~ye, ~l, ~bou for the 3rd person.

Similarly ~ir, ~or, ~ar indicate present continuous tense, ~yi, ~yó, ~ye present perfect tense, ~lám, ~lá, ~l past tense, and ~youm, ~bá, ~bou future tense.

		1st person	2nd person	3rd person
present	simple present	Añí hái. I eat.	Tuñí/Oñne hóo. Tui hós. You eat.	Ite/Ibá/Itará há. He/She/They eats/eats/eat.
present	present progressive	Añí háir. I am eating.	Tuñí/Oñne hóor. Tui hóor. You are eating.	Ite/Ibá/Itará hár. He/She/They is/is/are eating. Ite/Ibá/Itará hái boi. He/She/They is/is/are eating.
present	perfect	Añí hái félaiyi. I have eaten.	Tuñí/Oñne hái félaiyó. Tui hái félaiyós. You have eaten.	Ite/Ibá/Itará hái félaiye. He/She/They has/has/have eaten.
present	perfect continuous	Añí hái félair. I have been eating.	Tuñí/Oñne hái féloor. Tui hái féloor. You have been eating.	Ite/Ibá/Itará hái félaar. He/She/They has/has/have been eating.
Past	near past	Añí háiyi. I ate.	Tuñí/Oñne háiyo. Tui háiyós. You ate.	Ite/Ibá/Itará háaiye. He/She/They ate.
Past	far past	Añí háailam. I ate.	Tuñí/Oñne háailá. Tui háailí. You ate.	Ite/Ibá/Itará háail. He/She/They ate.
Past	past progressive	Añí háat táikkilám. I was eating.	Tuñí/Oñne háat táikkilá. Tui háat táikkilí. You were eating.	Ite/Ibá/Itará háat táikkil. He/She/They was/was/were eating.
Past	perfect	Añí hái félailám. I had eaten.	Tuñí/Oñne hái félailá. Tui hái félailí. You had eaten.	Ite/Ibá/Itará hái félail. He/She/They had eaten.
Past	perfect continuous	Añí hái félaat táikkilám. I had been eating.	Tuñí/Oñne hái félaat táikkilá. Tui hái félaat táikkilí. You had been eating.	Ite/Ibá/Itará hái félaat táikkil. He/She/They had been eating.
Future	simple future	Añí háiyoum. I will eat.	Tuñí/Oñne háiba. Tui háibí. You will eat.	Ite/Ibá/Itará háibou. He/She/They will eat.
Future	future progressive	Añí háat tákiyoum. I will be eating. Añí háiyoum boi. I will be eating.	Tuñí/Oñne háat tákibá. Tui háat tákibí. You will be eating. Tuñí/Oñne háiba goi. Tui háibi goi. You will be eating.	Ite/Ibá/Itará háat tákibou. He/She/They will be eating. Ite/Ibá/Itará háibou goi. He/She/They will be eating.
Future	perfect	Añí hái félaiyoum. I will have eaten.	Tuñí/Oñne hái félaibá. Tui hái félaibí. You will have eaten.	Ite/Ibá/Itará hái félaibou. He/She/They will has/has/have eaten.
Future	perfect continuous	Añí hái félaat tákiyoum. I will have been eating.	Tuñí/Oñne hái félaat tákibá. Tui hái félaat tákibí. You will have been eating.	Ite/Ibá/Itará hái félaat tákibou. He/She/They will has/has/have been eating.

=== Pronouns ===
Number	Person	Gender	Pronouns				Possessive adjectives
Number	Person	Gender	Subject	Object	Possessive	Reflexive	Possessive adjectives
Singular	1st	m/f (I)	añí, mui	añáre, moré	añár, mor	añínize, muinize	añár, mor
Singular	2nd	m/f (you)	tuñí tui oñne	tuáñre toré oñnoré	tuáñr tor oñnor	tuñínize tuinize oñnenize	tuáñr tor oñnor
Singular	3rd	m (he)	ite * te * uite ** íte **	itaré taré uitaré ítare	itar tar uitar ítar	itenize tenize uitenize ítenize	itar tar uitar ítar
Singular	3rd	m/f (he/she)	ibá * uibá ** íba **	ibáre uibáre íbare	ibár uibár íbar	ibánize uibánize íbanize	ibár uibár íbar
Singular	3rd	n (it)	yián ibá yían ** íba **	yiánóre ibáre yíanóre íbare	yiánór ibár yíanór íbar	yiánnize ibánize yíannize íbanize	yiánór ibár yíanór íbar
Plural	1st	m/f (we)	añára	añáráre	añárar	añáránize	añárar
Plural	2nd	m/f (you)	tuáñra	tuáñráre	tuáñrar	tuáñránize	tuáñrar
Plural	3rd	m/f (they)	itará * tará * uitará ** ítara **	itaráre taráre uitaráre ítarare	itarár tarár uitarár ítarar	itaránize taránize uitaránize ítaranize	itarár tarár uitarár ítarar
Plural	3rd	n (they)	iín * íin ** uún úun ** uuín **	iínóre íinóre uúnóre úunóre uuínóre	iínór íinór uúnór úunór uuínór	iínnize íinnize uúnnize úunnize uuínnize	iínór íinór uúnór úunór uuínór

Gender: m=male, f=female, n=neuter, *=the person or object is near, **=the person or object is far

=== Interrogative ===
The interrogative is indicated by né at the end of the sentence.

Itattú gór ekkán asé né? [Does he have a house?]
Itattú gór ekkán asé. [He has a house.]
Ibá za né? [Does she go?]
Ibá za. [She goes.]
Itará giyé né? [Did they go?]
Itará giyé. [They went.]

=== Inflection for person ===
Rohingya verbs indicate person by suffixes.

Present Tense
lek = write (command to you sg.)
lekí = I/we write.
lekó = write (command to you pl.)
lekós = You write (sg./pl.).
leké = He/she/they write(s).

Present Continuous Tense
lekír = I/we am/are writing.
lekór = You (sg./pl.) are writing.
lekér = He/she/they is/are writing.

Present Perfect Tense
lekífélaiyi = I/we have written.
lekífélaiyo = You (sg./pl.) have written.
lekífélaiyós = You (sg.) have written. (used to very closed people)
lekífélaiye = He/she/they has/have written.

Future Tense
lekíyóum = I/we will write.
lekíbá = You (sg./pl.) will write.
lekíbi = You (sg.) will write. (used to very closed people)
lekíbóu = He/she/they will write.

Past Tense (Immediate/near past)
leikkí = I/we wrote.
leikkó = You (sg./pl.) wrote.
leikkós = You (sg.) wrote. (used to very closed people)
leikké = He/she/they wrote.

Past Tense (Remote past)
leikkílám = I/we wrote long ago.
leikkílá = You (sg./pl.) wrote long ago.
leikkílí = You (sg.) wrote long ago. (used to very closed people)
leikkíl = He/she/they wrote long ago.

Past Tense (If possibility)
lekítám = I/we would have written.
lekítá = You (sg./pl.) would have written.
lekítí = You (sg.) would have written. (used to very closed people)
lekítóu = He/she/they would have written.

Forming Noun, Doer, Tool, Action
lekóon = act of writing.
e.g. Debalor uore lekóon gom noó. Writing on wall is not good.
lekóya = writer.
e.g. Itaráttú lekóya bicí. They-have many writers.
lekóni = thing with which you write.
e.g. Añártú honó lekóni nái. I-have no any writing-thing (i.e. pen, pencil)
lekát = in the action of writing.
e.g. Tui lekát asós. You are busy-in-writing.

=== Case ===
Examples of the case inflection are given below, using the singular forms of the Rohingya term for "hóliba (tailor)" which belongs to Rohingya's first declension class.

- hólibaye (nominative) "[the] hóliba" [as a subject] (e.g. hólibaye tíai táikke éçe – the tailor is standing there)
- hólibar (genitive) "[the] hóliba's / [of the] hóliba" (e.g. hólibar nam Ahmed – the tailor's name is Ahmed)
- hóliballa (dative) "[to/for the] hóliba" [as an indirect object] (e.g. hóliballa hádiya ekkán diyí – I gave a present for the tailor)
- hólibare (accusative) "[the] hóliba" [as a direct object] (e.g. Aññí hólibare deikkí – I saw the tailor)
- hólibaloi (ablative) "[by/with/from/in the] hóliba" [in various uses] (e.g. Aññí hólibaloi duan ot giyí – I went to the shop with the tailor).'
- óu hóliba / hóliba ya (vocative) "[you] the hóliba" [addressing the object] (e.g. "cúkuria tuáñre, óu hóliba (sáb)" – thank you, tailor).

=== Morphology ===
Seventy or more different forms are available in Rohingya. A hyphen (-) between letters is to be removed, it is used for initial understanding only — how the word is formed.

Command

1. lek =write (sg.) Tui yián ehón lek. You write this right now.
2. lek-ó =write (pl.) Tuñí yián ehón lekó. You write this right now.
3. lek-á =cause to write Tui/Tuñí John ór áta leká/lekó. You ask John to write.
4. lek-í-de =help to write Tui/Tuñí ibáre lekíde/lekído. You help John in writing.

Present

1. lek-í =write (I) Aññí hámicá gór ot lekí. I always write at home.
2. lek-ó =write (II) Tuñí hámicá gór ot lekó. You always write at home.
3. lek-ó-s =write (IIa) Tui hámicá gór ot lekós. You always write at home.
4. lek-é =write (III) Tará hámicá gór ot leké. They always write at home.

Continuous

1. lek-í-r =writing (I) Aññí ciñçí ekkán lekír. I am writing a letter now.
2. lek-ó-or =writing (II) Tuñí/Tui ciñçí ekkán lekóor. You are writing a letter now.
3. lek-é-r =writing (III) Tará ciñçí ekkán lekér. They are writing a letter now.

Perfect

1. lek-í-féla-iyi =have written (I) Aññí ciñçí lekífélaiyi. I have written a letter.
2. lek-í-féla-iyo =have written (II) Tuñí ciñçí lekífélaiyo. You have written a letter.
3. lek-í-féla-iyo-s =have written (IIa) Tui ciñçí lekífélaiyos. You have written a letter.
4. lek-í-féla-iye =has/have written (III) Tará ciñçí lekífélaiye. They have written a letter.

Past

1. leik-kí =wrote (I) Aññí ciñçí ekkán leikkí. I wrote a letter.
2. leik-kó =wrote (II) Tuñí ciñçí ekkán leikkó. You wrote a letter.
3. leik-kó-s =wrote (IIa) Tui ciñçí ekkán leikkós. You wrote a letter.
4. leik-ké =wrote (III) Tará ciñçí ekkán leikké. They wrote a letter.

Future

1. lek-í-youm =will write (I) Aññí ciñçí ekkán lekíyoum. I will write a letter.
2. lek-í-ba =will write (II) Tuñí ciñçí ekkán lekíba. You will write a letter.
3. lek-í-bi =will write (IIa) Tui ciñçí ekkán lekkíbi. You will write a letter.
4. lek-í-bou =will write (III) Tará ciñçí ekkán lekíbou. They will write a letter.

Alternative

1. leik-kyóum =will write (I) Aññí ciñçí ekkán leikkyóum. I will write a letter.
2. leik-bá =will write (II) Tuñí ciñçí ekkán leikbá. You will write a letter.
3. leik-bí =will write (IIa) Tui ciñçí ekkán leikbí. You will write a letter.
4. leik-bóu =will write (III) Tará ciñçí ekkán leikbóu. They will write a letter.

Passive

1. lek-á-giye =(passive I, II, III) Ciñçí ekkán lekágiyé. A letter is/was written.

Possibility

1. lek-á-za =being writable Ciñçí yián leká za. This letter is writable.
2. lek-á-za-ibou =being writable in future Ciñçí yián leká zaibou. This letter will be writable.
3. lek-á-di-ya-za =can be made writable Ciñçí yián lekádiyaza. This letter can be made writable.

Noun

1. lek-á =writing Leká yián bicí cúndor. This writing is very beautiful.
2. lek-ó-on =act of writing Email beggún óttu lekóon saá. All should write emails.
3. lek-ó-ya =person who writes Ahmed bála lekóya. Ahmed is a good writer.
4. lek-ó-ni =thing used to write Añártu honó lekóni ciz nái. I do not have anything to write with.
5. lek-á-ni =tool used to write Añártu honó lekáni boudh nái. I do not have any writing board.
6. lek-á-lekí =activities to write Tuáñrár bútore lekáleki tákoon saá. There should be writing between you.

Adjective

1. lek-é-de =thing used for writing Añártu honó lekéde ciz nái. I do not have any writable thing.
2. leik-kyá =of written Kitab ibá fura leikká. This book is fully written.
3. leik-kyé-dé=of that written Añártu honó leikkyéde juab nái. I do not have any written answer.

Adverb

1. lek-í lek-í =by writing & writing/while writing Ite gór ottu lekí lekí aiyér. He is coming from home while writing.

Immediate present

1. lek-í-lam =acted to write (I) Aññí habos sán lekílam. I write the letter.
2. lek-í-la =acted to write (II) Tuñí habos sán lekíla. You write the letter.
3. lek-í-li =acted to write (II) Tui habos sán lekíli. You write the letter.
4. lek-í-lou =acted to write (III) Tará habos sán lekílou. They write the letter.

Alternative

1. leik-lám =acted to write (I) Aññí habos sán lekílam. I write the letter.
2. leik-lá =acted to write (II) Tuñí habos sán lekíla. You write the letter.
3. leik-lí =acted to write (II) Tui habos sán lekíli. You write the letter.
4. leik-lou =acted to write (III) Tará habos sán lekílou. They write the letter.

Long past

1. leik-kí-lam =had written (I) Aññí habos sán leikkílam. I had written this paper long ago.
2. leik-kí-la =had written (II) Tuñí habos sán leikkíla. You had written this paper long ago.
3. leik-kí-li =had written (II) Tui habos sán leikkíli. You had written this paper long ago.
4. leik-kí-l =had written (III) Tará habos sán leikkíl. They had written this paper long ago.

Remote future

1. lek-í-youm éri =will write later (I) Aññí habos sán lekíyoum éri. I will write the paper sometime later.
2. lek-í-ba ri =will write later (II) Tuñí habos sán lekíba ri. You will write the paper sometime later.
3. lek-í-bi ri =will write later (IIa) Tui habos sán lekíbi ri. You write the paper sometime later.
4. lek-í-bou ri =will write later (III) Tará habos sán lekíbou ri. They will write the paper sometime later.

Conditional

1. lek-í-tam =would have written (I) Aññí email lán lekítam. I would have written the email.
2. lek-í-ta =would have written (II) Tuñí email lán lekíta i. You would have written the email.
3. lek-í-ti =would have written (IIa) Tui email lán lekíti. You would have written the email.
4. lek-í-tou =would have written (III) Tará email lán lekítou. They would have written the email.

Alternative

1. leik-tám =would have written (I) Aññí email lán leiktám. I would have written the email.
2. leik-tá =would have written (II) Tuñí email lán leiktá. You would have written the email.
3. leik-tí =would have written (IIa) Tui email lán leiktí. You would have written the email.
4. leik-tóu =would have written (III) Tará email lán leiktóu. They would have written the email.

Request/allow

1. lek-ó-na =please write Meérbanigorí lekóna. Please write the letter.
2. lek-ó-goi =allowed to write Tuñí lekó gói. Let you write.

Alternative

1. lek-se-ná =please write Meérbanigorí leksená. Please write the letter.
2. lek-gói =allowed to write Tui lek gói. Let you write.

If

1. lek-í-le =if (I/II/III) person write Tuñí lekíle gom óibou. It will be good if you write.

== Writing systems ==
=== Rohingya Hanifi script ===
The Hanifi Rohingya script is a unified script for the Rohingya language. Rohingya was first written in the 19th century with a version of the Perso-Arabic script. In 1975, an orthographic Arabic script was developed, based on the Urdu alphabet.

In the 1980s, (Maolana) Mohammad Hanif and his colleagues created the suitable phonetic script based on Arabic letters; it has been compared to the N’ko script. The script also includes a set of decimal numbers.

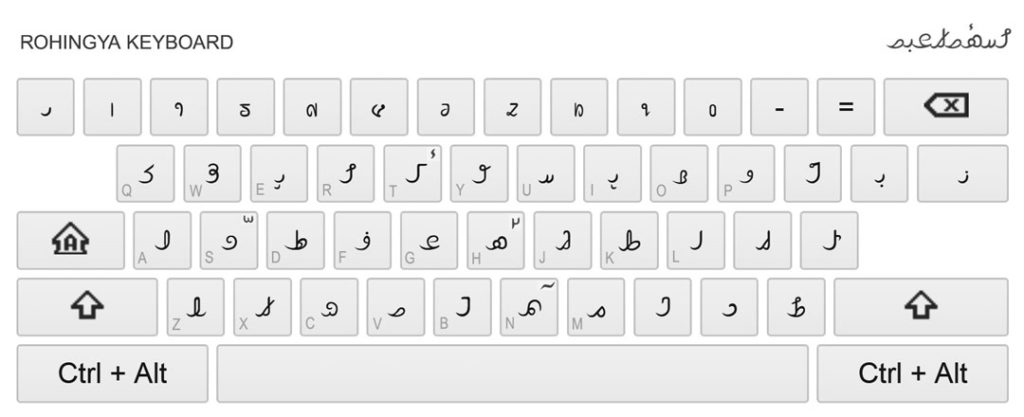
Layout of the Rohingya virtual keyboard.

A virtual keyboard was developed by Google for the Rohingya language in 2019 and allows users to type in the Rohingya script. Ahkter Husin, a Rohingya software developer developed a keyboard for Android phones which is available on Google Play Store. Ahkter Husin and Kyaw Zay Ya Lin Tun also developed a keyboard app for IOS. Rohingya programmers also developed an online Unicode keyboard converter.

==== Characters ====
Rohingya Hanifi script consonants -29
𐴌𐴟𐴇𐴥𐴝𐴚𐴒𐴙𐴝 𐴇𐴥𐴡𐴌𐴟𐴉𐴢
𐴅	𐴄	𐴃	𐴂	𐴁	𐴀
𐴋	𐴊	𐴉	𐴈	𐴇	𐴆
𐴑	𐴐	𐴏	𐴎	𐴍	𐴌
𐴗	𐴖	𐴕	𐴔	𐴓	𐴒
	𐴜	𐴛	𐴚	𐴙	𐴘

Rohingya Hanifi script vowels -7
𐴌𐴟𐴇𐴥𐴝𐴚𐴒𐴙𐴝 𐴀𐴝𐴉𐴡𐴌 𐴀𐴞𐴉𐴡𐴌𐴢
𐴢	𐴡	𐴠	𐴟	𐴞	𐴝
	◌𐴧	◌𐴦	◌𐴥	◌𐴤	𐴣

Rohingya Hanifi script numerals
𐴌𐴟𐴇𐴥𐴝𐴚𐴒𐴙𐴝 𐴓𐴡𐴔𐴁𐴡𐴌𐴢
𐴰	𐴱	𐴲	𐴳	𐴴	𐴵	𐴶	𐴷	𐴸	𐴹

=== Rohingya Arabic script ===
The first Rohingya language texts, written in Arabic script, are claimed to be more than 200 years old, though there is no concrete evidence about it. While Arakan was under British rule (1826–1948), the Rohingya people used mainly English and Urdu for written communication. Since independence in 1948, Burmese has been used in all official communications. Since the early 1960s, Rohingya scholars have advocated for a writing system suited to their own language.

Later in 1975, Rohingya community leaders in Myanmar have chosen to use the Arabic script for modern usage as well. This modern use of the script is called “Rohingya Fonna”. The Rohingya Fonna script is essentially this historic script, but with some extra symbols as the unmodifed Arabic script is unsuited to the Rohingya language. While there is minimal literature using Rohingya Fonna, it does have the approval of the community leaders. One of the most significant advocates of Rohingya Arabic script had been Kyaw Hla Aung, a lawyer and civil rights activist.

At present, a Rohingya Unicode font is available. It is based on Arabic letters (since those are far more understood by the people) with additional tone signs. Tests that have been conducted suggest that this script can be learned in a matter of hours if the reader has learned Arabic in a madrassa.

The script includes 3 Arabic vowel diacritics, as well as 3 additional diacritics. Six "double diacritics" representing nasal vowels are also present. In addition, Rohingya Fonna also has 3 tone markers. Tone markers act as "modifiers" of vowel diacritics. In simpler words, they are "diacritics for the diacritics". They are written "outside" of the word, meaning that they are written above the vowel diacritic if the diacritic is written above the word, and they are written below the diacritic if the diacritic is written below the word. They are only ever written where there are vowel diacritics. This is important to note, as without the diacritic present, there is no way to distinguish between tone markers and I‘jām i.e. dots that are used for purpose of phonetic distinctions of consonants.

The Rohingya Fonna Unicode keyboard layout as well as a free font can be found here.

Rohingya Arabic script consonants - 39
ب	پ	ت	ٹ	ث	ج
چ	ح	خ	د	ڈ	ذ
ر	ࢪ	ڑ	ز	س	ش
ص	ض	ط	ظ	ع	غ
ڠ	ف	ڤ	ق	‌ ک‌	گ
‌ ل	م	ن	ں	و	ࢫ
ه	ي	ࢬ			

Letters in yellow boxes are solely used in loanwords. Letters in green boxes are uniquely Rohingya.

Rohingya Arabic script vowels - 6
Short vowels
◌َ	◌ࣤ	◌ِ	◌ࣦ	◌ُ	◌ࣥ
Postnasalized vowels
◌ً	◌ࣧ	◌ٍ	◌ࣩ	◌ࣱ	◌ࣨ
◌ۡ	◌ّ				

Rohingya Arabic script tone markers - 3
◌࣪ / ◌࣭	◌࣫ / ◌࣮	◌࣬ / ◌࣯

=== Rohingya Latin script ===
In 1999 E.M. Siddique Basu was able to simplify the Rohingya writing using Latin letters. It is an intuitive writing system which can be learnt easily and is known as Rohingyalish or Rohingya Fonna that uses only 26 Roman letters, five accented vowels, and two additional Latin characters for retroflex and nasal sounds.

Rohingya Character Set-28
A a	B b	C c	Ç ç	D d	E e	F f
G g	H h	I i	J j	K k	L l	M m
N n	Ñ ñ	O o	P p	Q q	R r	S s
T t	U u	V v	W w	X x	Y y	Z z

Q, V, and X are used only for loan-words.

The character set table of the Rohingya writing system uses the Latin letters shown above (ç and ñ with green background). The vowels are written both unaccented (aeiou) and accented (áéíóú). The use of c, ç and ñ is adapted to the language; c represents /ʃ/ (English sh), ç is the retroflex r ([ɽ]), and ñ indicates a nasalised vowel (e.g., fañs /fãs/ 'five'). Crucially, these can all be accessed from an English keyboard, for example by using the English (US) International keyboard.

Names and pronunciation of letters
The names of the letters of the Latin Rohingya alphabet are similar to the names of the letters of the English alphabet.

Basic letters
Grapheme	Pronunciation	Name
a	/a/	ee
b	/b/	bii
c	/ʃ/	cii
ç	/ɽ/	çii
d	/d̪/	dii
e	/e/	ii
f	/f/	ef
g	/g/	jii
h	/h, x/	eech
i	/i/	ai
j	/ɟ/	jee
k	/k/	kee
l	/l/	el
m	/m/	em
n	/n/	en
ñ	/◌̃/ (nasalization)	añ
o	/ɔ/	oou
p	/p/	pii
q	/q/	kyuu
r	/r/	er
s	/s/	es
t	/t̪/	tii
u	/u/	yuu
v	/v/	vii
w	/w/	dblyuu
x	/ks/	eks
y	/j/	way
z	/z/	zed

Digraphs
Grapheme	Pronunciation
ch	/c/
dh	/ɖ/
dz	/d̪/
h'	/h/
kh	/x/
ng	/ŋ/
ny	/ɲ/
ou	/o/
th	/ʈ/
ts	/t̪/

Long vowels in Rohingyalish are spelled with double vowels: for example, a long /ɔ/ is spelled as "oo", while a long /o/ is spelled as "oou".

== Sample text ==
The following is a sample text in Rohingya of Article 1 of the Universal Declaration of Human Rights with English, contrasted with versions of the text in Bengali, Assamese, Chakma, Chittagonian and Noakhali.

Rohingya in Rohingya Latin alphabet	:Manúic beggún azad hísafe, ar izzot arde hók ókkol ót, fúainna hísafe foida óiye. Fottí insán óttu honó forók sára elan ot aséde tamám hók ókkol arde azadi ókkol loi fáaida goróon ór hók asé. Ar, taráre dil arde demak diyé. Ótolla, taráttu ekzon loi arekzon bái hísafe maamela goróon saá.
Rohingya in Hanifi Script	.𐴔𐴝𐴕𐴟𐴤𐴞𐴐 𐴁𐴠𐴒𐴧𐴟𐴤𐴕 𐴝𐴎𐴝𐴊 𐴇𐴞𐴤𐴏𐴝𐴉𐴠,. 𐴝𐴌 𐴞𐴎𐴧𐴡𐴃𐴝𐴌𐴊𐴠 𐴇𐴡𐴤𐴑 𐴡𐴤𐴑𐴧𐴡𐴓 𐴡𐴤𐴃, 𐴉𐴟𐴤𐴝𐴞𐴕𐴧𐴝 𐴇𐴞𐴤𐴏𐴝𐴉𐴠 𐴉𐴡𐴞𐴊𐴝 𐴡𐴤𐴞𐴘𐴠. 𐴉𐴡𐴃𐴧𐴞𐴤 𐴞𐴕𐴏𐴝𐴤𐴕 𐴡𐴤𐴃𐴧𐴟 𐴇𐴡𐴕𐴡𐴤 𐴉𐴡𐴌𐴡𐴤𐴑. 𐴏𐴝𐴤𐴌𐴝 𐴠𐴓𐴝𐴕 𐴡𐴃 𐴀𐴏𐴠𐴤𐴊𐴠 𐴃𐴝𐴔𐴝𐴤𐴔 𐴇𐴡𐴤𐴑 𐴡𐴤𐴑𐴧𐴡𐴓 𐴝𐴌𐴊𐴠 𐴝𐴎𐴝𐴊𐴞 𐴡𐴤𐴑𐴧𐴡𐴓 𐴓𐴡𐴞 𐴉𐴝𐴥𐴞𐴊𐴝 𐴒𐴡𐴌𐴡𐴥𐴕 𐴡𐴤𐴌 𐴇𐴡𐴤𐴑 𐴝𐴌, 𐴃𐴝𐴌𐴝𐴤𐴌𐴠, 𐴊𐴞𐴓 𐴝𐴌𐴊𐴠 𐴊𐴠𐴔𐴝𐴑 𐴊𐴞𐴘𐴠𐴤. 𐴡𐴤𐴃𐴡𐴓𐴧𐴝, 𐴃𐴝𐴌𐴝𐴤𐴃𐴧𐴟 𐴠𐴑𐴎𐴡𐴕 𐴓𐴡𐴞. 𐴝𐴌𐴠𐴑𐴎𐴡𐴕 𐴁𐴝𐴤𐴞 𐴇𐴞𐴤𐴏𐴝𐴉𐴠 𐴔𐴝𐴧𐴔𐴠𐴓𐴝 𐴒𐴡𐴌𐴡𐴥𐴕 𐴏𐴝𐴦.
Rohingya in Rohingya Arabic Script	مَنُ࣪شۡ بࣦگُّ࣪نۡ اَزَدۡ حِ࣭سَفࣦ، اَرۡ عِزّࣤتۡ اَرۡدࣦ حࣤ࣪قۡ اࣤ࣪كّࣤلۡ اࣤ࣪تۡ، فُ࣪وَ࣪نَّ࣪ࢬ حِ࣭سَفࣦ فࣤيۡدَ اࣤ࣪يّࣦ. فࣤتِّ اِنۡسَ࣪نۡ اࣤ࣪تُّ هࣤنࣤ࣪ فࣤرࣤ࣪كۡ سَ࣪رَ࣪ عࣦلَنۡ اࣤتۡ اَسࣦ࣭دࣦ تَمَ࣪مۡ حࣤ࣪قۡ اࣤ࣪كّࣤلۡ اَرۡدࣦ اَزَدِ اࣤ࣪كّࣤلۡ لࣤيۡ فَ࣫يۡدَ࣪ گࣤرࣤ࣫نۡ اࣤ࣪رۡ حࣤ࣪قۡ اَسࣦ࣭. اَرۡ، تَرَ࣪رࣦ࣭ دِلۡ اَرۡدࣦ دࣦمَكۡ دِيࣦ࣭ اࣤ࣪تࣤ࣪لَّ، تَرَ࣪تُّ࣪ اࣦك زࣤنۡ لࣤيۡ اَرۡ اࣦكۡزࣤنۡ بَ࣪يۡ حِ࣭سَفࣦ مَامَلَ گࣤرࣤ࣫نۡ سَ࣬.
Rohingya in Bengali—Assamese Script	মানুইষ বেগ্গুন আজাদ হিসাফে, আর ইজ্জত আর্দে হক অক্কল অত, ফুয়াইন্না হিসাবে ফয়দা ওইয়ে। ফোত্তি ইন্সান ওত্তু হোনো ফরক ছাড়া এলান ওত আছেদে তামাম হক অক্কল আর্দে আজাদি অক্কল লই ফাইদা গরওন অর হক আছে। অতোল্লা, তারাত্তু একজন লই আরেকজন বাই হিসাফে মামেলা গরওন সা।
English original:	"All human beings are born free and equal in dignity and rights. They are endowed with reason and conscience and should act towards one another in a spirit of brotherhood."
Bengali in Latin script	Shômosto manush shadhinbhabe shôman môrjada ebong odhikar niye jônmogrohon kôre. Tãder bibek ebong buddhi achhe; shutorang shôkoleri êke ôporer proti bhratrittoshulobh mônobhab niye achôron kôra uchit.
Assamese in Latin script	Xôkôlû manuhê sadhinbhawê xôman môrzôda aru ôdhikar lôi zônmôgrôhôn kôrê. Xihôtôr bibêk aru buddhi asê aru xihôtê pôrôspôr bhratrittôrê asôrôn kôribô lagê.
Chakma	𑄝𑄬𑄉𑄴 𑄟𑄚𑄪𑄥𑄴𑄥𑄪𑄚𑄴 𑄥𑄴𑄤𑄙𑄩𑄚𑄴 𑄉𑄧𑄢𑄨 𑄃𑄬𑄇𑄴𑄇𑄧𑄃𑄨 𑄟𑄧𑄢𑄴𑄡𑄘 𑄃𑄢𑄴 𑄃𑄧𑄙𑄨𑄇𑄢𑄴 𑄣𑄧𑄚𑄬 𑄣𑄰 𑄎𑄧𑄚𑄴𑄟𑄧 𑄃𑄧𑄚𑄴𑅁 𑄖𑄢𑄢𑄴 𑄝𑄨𑄝𑄬𑄇𑄴 𑄝𑄪𑄘𑄴𑄙𑄨 𑄝𑄬𑄇𑄴𑄇𑄚𑄨 𑄃𑄉𑄬, 𑄥𑄬𑄚𑄧𑄖𑄴𑄖𑄬 𑄃𑄟𑄢𑄴 𑄝𑄬𑄇𑄴𑄇𑄪𑄚𑄬𑄣𑄴𑄣𑄬𑄃𑄨 𑄘𑄮𑄣𑄴 𑄌𑄨𑄖𑄴𑄖𑄧𑄣𑄰 𑄥𑄧𑄁𑄛𑄧𑄢𑄕 𑄃𑄪𑄌𑄨𑄖𑄴𑅁
Chakma in Bengali-Assamese script	বেগ মানুষসুন স্বাধীনগরি এক্কই মর্যাদা আর অধিকার লনে লই জন্ম অন। তারার বিবেক বুদ্ধি বেক্কানি আগে। সেনত্তে আমার বেক্কুনেল্লেই দোল চিত্তলই সংপরানা উচিৎ।
Chakma in Latin script	Beg manussun swadhīn gori ekkoi morzada ar odhikar lone loi jonmo on. Tarar bibek buddhi bekkani age, senotte amar bekkunellei dôl cittoloi soṁporana ucit.
Chittagonian in Bengali-Assamese script	বিয়াক মানুশ ইজ্‌জত এদ‌্দে অ়কর ই়শাবে আজাদ আর উ়য়াইন্‌না অ়ইয়েরে ফ়য়দা অ়য়। ই়তারাত্‌তু আহল এদ্‌দে বিবেক আছে; এতল্‌লায় এজ্‌জন আরেজ্‌জনর উ়য়ারে ভাইয়ুর নান বেভার গরন দরহার।
Chittagonian in Latin script	Biyak manuś ijjôt edde ókôr íśabe ajad ar úyainnaa óiyere fôyda óy. Ítarattu ahôl edde bibek ase; etôllay ejjôn arejjônôr úyare bhaiyur nan bebhar gôrôn dôrhar.
Noakhali in Bengali-Assamese script	বেক মানুষ ইজ্জত আজ়্জ়ে হোকের হিসাইব্বে হোমাইন্যা ওই ফ়য়দা অয়, এতারগত্তে আক্কল আজ়্জ়ে বিবেক আজ়্জ়ে, হিল্লাই বুলি ইগ্গা আরিগ্গার লগে বাইয়ের নান বেবোয়ার করণ জরুরি।
Noakhali in Latin script	Bek mānush ijjot āzze hoker hisāibbe homāinnā oi foydā oy, etārgottē ākkol āzze bibek āzze, hillāi buli iggā ārigger loge bāyēr nān beboār koroṇ joruri.
