= Hanifa Nabukeera =

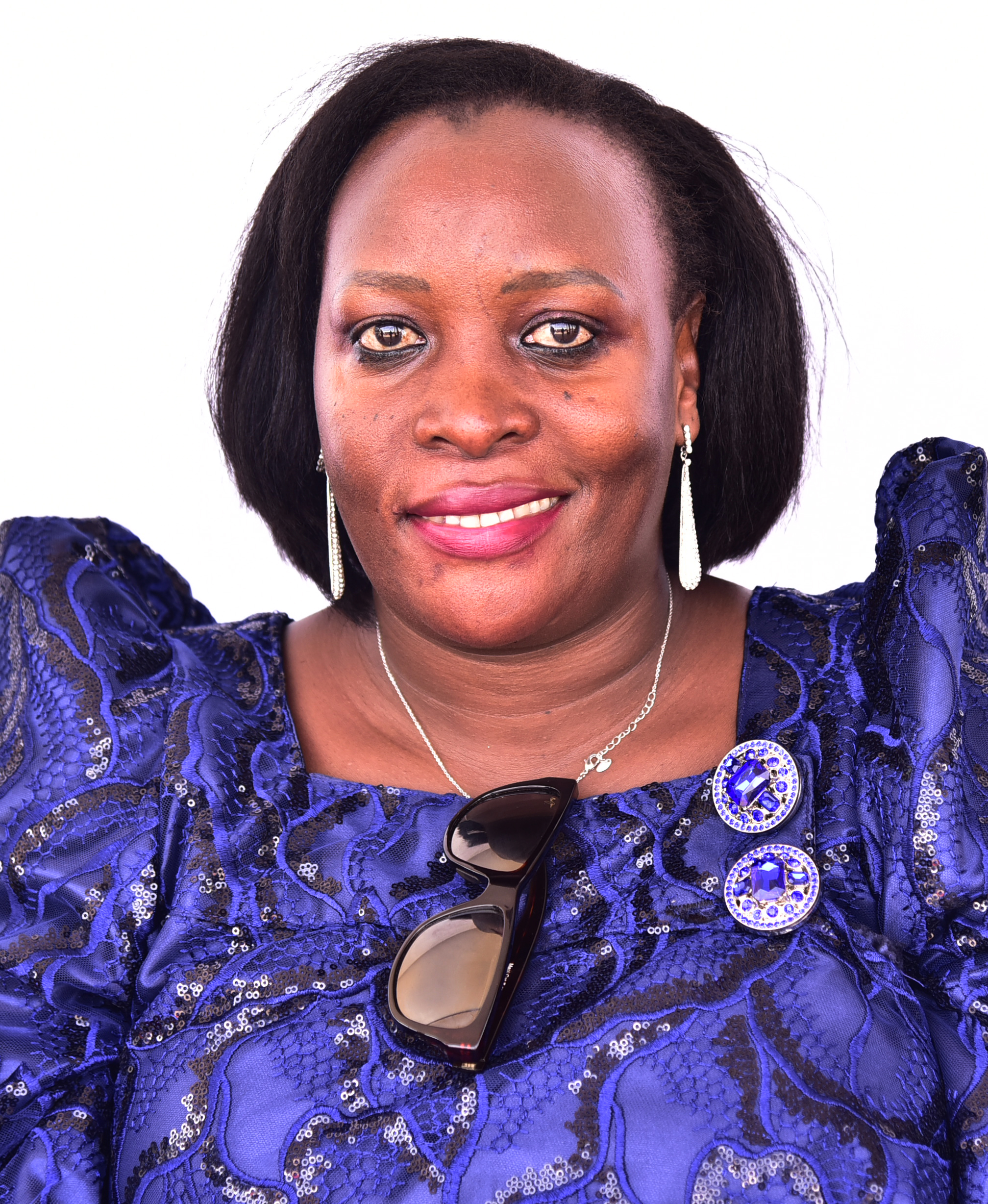
- Born: Mukono District in Central Region of Uganda
- Citizenship: Uganda
- Occupations: Business woman and politician
- Political party: National Unity Platform (NUP)
- Movement: Member of Parliament elect for Mukono District, affiliated with the National Unity Platform
- Awards: 11th parliament for Mokono District

Hanifa Nabukeera is a Ugandan business woman and a politician. She served as a woman member of Parliament for Mukono District, affiliated with the National Unity Platform (NUP) political party. She lost to Betty Nambooze in the 2026 elections.

Nabukeera succeeded Kusasira Peace Kanyesigye Mubiru, whom she defeated in the general elections in 2021.

== Early life and education ==
Nabukeera was born in Mukono District in the Central Region of Uganda. She ran for the Member of Parliament seat in 2011 and 2016, losing to Ronald Kibuule and Kusasira Peace, respectively. She was the second runner-up in the 2016 Women Parliamentary race.

Nabukeera served in the 11th Parliament for Mukono District and was affiliated with the NUP.
