= Hanifa Deen =

Australian writer, of Pakistani ancestry

Hanifa Deen is an Australian writer, of Pakistani ancestry. She won the New South Wales Premier's Literary Awards — Ethnic Affairs Commission Award in 1996, and her book, The Jihad Seminar, was short-listed for the 2008 Human Rights Awards — Literature Non-Fiction Award.

== Biography ==
She has described how one of her grandfathers was a Kashmiri who jumped ship in Melbourne, while the other was a Punjabi small business man who came in the wake of the Afghan camel drivers, who helped to facilitate access to the Australian interior.

Her non-fiction books have focused on issues concerning Muslims. Her first book, Caravanserai, portrayed the lives of Australian Muslims. Her second book, Broken Bangles, focused on Muslim women in South Asia (Pakistan and Bangladesh). The Crescent and the Pen described the author's journey on the trail of Taslima Nasreen, the author of the controversial novel Lajja ("Shame"), after she fled Bangladesh for Europe. Deen's 2008 book, The Jihad Seminar is about Melbourne's first religious hate speech case, (UWA Press). Ali Abdul vs The King was published in 2011 by UWA publishers. In 2013 The Crescent and the Pen was extensively rewritten and released as On the Trail of Taslim in paperback by Indian Ocean Press.

== Awards and honours ==
Caravansserai won the New South Wales Premier's Literary Awards — Ethnic Affairs Commission Award in 1996, and The Jihad Seminar was short-listed for the 2008 Human Rights Awards — Literature Non-Fiction Award.

== Publications ==
- Caravanserai : journey among Australian Muslims, 1995
- Broken bangles, 1998
- The crescent and the pen : the strange journey of Taslima Nasreen, 2006
- The jihād seminar, 2008
- Ali Abdul v. the king : Muslim stories from the dark days of white Australia, 2011
- On the trail of Taslima, 2013
