= Nahema Hanafi =

French historian (born 1983)

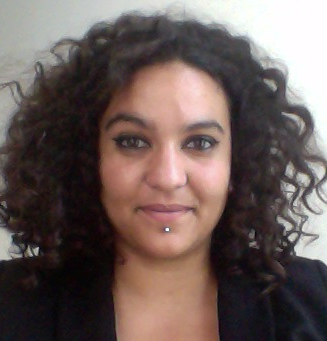
- Nahema Hanafi (2020)
- Born: July 4, 1983 (age 43); Fontainebleau, France
- Occupation: Historian
- Awards: Sigerist prize

Academic background
- Education: University of Toulouse-Jean Jaurès; University of Lausanne
- Thesis: Le frisson et le baume : souffrantes et soignantes au siècle des Lumières (France, Suisse) (2012)
- Doctoral advisor: Vincent Barras; Sylvie Mouysset

Academic work
- Discipline: Modern and contemporary history
- Sub-discipline: History of epistolary practices and self-narratives; History of medicine; Women's place in history; Gender studies
- Institutions: University of Angers
- Notable works: Le frisson et le baume. Souffrantes et soignantes au siècle des Lumières

Nahema Hanafi (Fontainebleau, 4 July 1983) is a French historian and a lecturer in modern and contemporary history at the University of Angers. She is interested in the history of epistolary practices and self-narratives, the history of medicine, women's place in history, and gender studies. She is co-editor of the journal Histoire, médecine et santé, and is the director of the master's degree in gender studies co-accredited by the University of Angers, University of Western Brittany, Le Mans University, University of Nantes, and Rennes 2 University. Hanafi is a Sigerist prize laureate.

== Education ==
In 2012, Nahema Hanafi defended a thesis in history under the direction of Vincent Barras and Sylvie Mouysset entitled Le frisson et le baume : souffrantes et soignantes au siècle des Lumières, at the University of Toulouse-Jean Jaurès and that of the University of Lausanne. This thesis studies the process of medicalization of society and the place of women in this transformation, by studying not the texts produced by the medical profession, but correspondence, diaries, and collections of feminine recipes. It was published in 2017 by Presses Universitaires de Rennes.

== Career and research ==
In the continuity of Hanafi's research on the history of medicine and gender, she is interested in the Italian castrati of the modern period by investigating the medical fabrication of sex and its possible reappropriations by the singers, as well as the notion of gender fluidity. She is also interested in epistolary practices and the self-narratives they generate over a long period of time, and in particular in the power of the written word as a tool for social transformation in her research on the fraudulent e-mails of Ivorian "grazers".

Since 2009, Hanafi is an associate researcher at the Institute of Humanities in Medicine at the University of Lausanne. In 2012, she became an associate researcher at the laboratory FRAMESPA at the University of Toulouse-Jean Jaurès. The following year, Hanafi became a lecturer in modern and contemporary history at the University of Angers, within the TEMOS (Temps, Mondes, Sociétés) (Time, World, Societies) laboratory. Since 2014, she has been co-editor of the journal Histoire, médecine et santé, a journal of sociocultural history of medicine and health published by FRAMESPA, TEMOS, and the Centre Alexandre Koyré. In 2017, she participated in the creation and became director of the master's degree in gender studies co-accredited by the University of Angers, University of Western Brittany, Le Mans University, University of Nantes, and Rennes 2 University.

== Awards ==
- 2013, History Thesis Award from the Comité des travaux historiques et scientifiques (CTHS)
- 2013, Sigerist prize, for Le frisson et le baume. Souffrantes et soignantes au siècle des Lumières

== Selected works ==
=== Books ===
- Hanafi, Nahema (2017). Le frisson et le baume: expériences féminines du corps au Siècle des Lumières (in French). Presses universitaires de Rennes. ISBN 978-2-7535-5485-6. OCLC 1002278555.
- Hanafi, Nahema (2020). L'arnaque à la nigériane: spams, rapports postcoloniaux et banditisme social (in French). Anacharsis. ISBN 979-1-02-790405-1. OCLC 1224307986.

=== Chapters ===
- Hanafi, Nahema; Rennes, Juliette (2017). "Fluides corporels". Encyclopédie critique du genre (in French). Paris: La Découverte.
