= Hanife =

- Pronunciation: [ˈhanife]
- Gender: Female

Origin
- Origin: Turkey

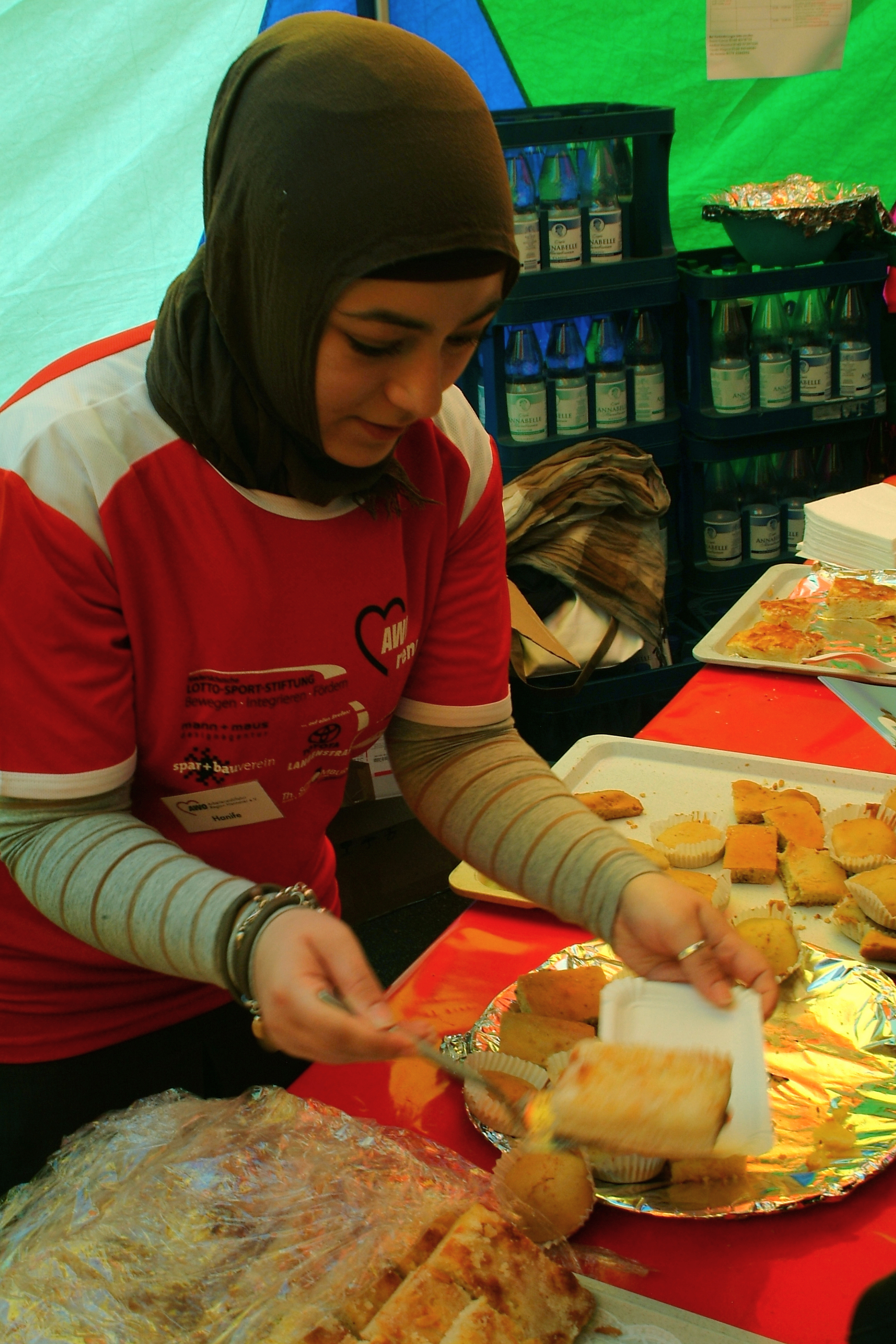
Hanife.jpg

Hanife is a female name of Turkish origin. It is the Turkish form of the Arabic name Hanifa, the feminine form of Hanif, which means "bend" (to the right religion).

== Given name ==
- Hanife Çetiner (1938–2011), Turkish fashion designer
- Hanife Demiryol (born 1992), Turkish women's footballer

== See also ==
- Hanifa (disambiguation)
