= Hanifi Rohingya script =

Unified script for the Rohingya language

Hanifi Rohingya script 𐴌𐴟𐴇𐴥𐴝𐴚𐴒𐴙𐴝 𐴇𐴝𐴕𐴞𐴉𐴞 𐴓𐴠𐴑𐴤𐴝 رُحَ࣪ڠۡگَ࣪ࢬ حَنِفِي لࣦكَ࣪ Ruáingga Hanifi leká
- The word "Rohingya" written in the script
- Script type: Alphabet with diacritics for tones and gemination
- Creator: Mohammad Hanif
- Created: 1980s
- Direction: Right-to-left script
- Languages: Rohingya language

Related scripts
- Parent systems: Egyptian hieroglyphs: Proto-Sinaitic script; Phoenician script; Aramaic script; Nabataean script; Arabic script; Hanifi Rohingya script

ISO 15924
- ISO 15924: Rohg (167), Hanifi Rohingya

Unicode
- Unicode alias: Hanifi Rohingya
- Unicode range: U+10D00–U+10D3F

The Hanifi Rohingya script is a unified script for the Rohingya language. It is one of three scripts currently used to write the Rohingya language, the other two being the Rohingya Arabic alphabet and the Rohingya Latin script. The Rohingya language was first written in the 19th century with a version of the Perso-Arabic script. In 1975, an orthographic Arabic script was developed and approved by the community leaders, based on the Urdu alphabet but with unique innovations to make the script suitable to Rohingya.

In the 1980s, Mohammad Hanif and his colleagues created a suitable phonetic script based on the Arabic alphabet; it has been compared to the N’ko script.

This script, unlike the Arabic script, is alphabetical, meaning that all vowels are independent letters, as opposed to diacritics as is the case in Arabic. However, vowels cannot stand on their own and always need to be connected to a consonant similar to diacritics. Therefore, diphthongs cannot be written as vowel-vowel combination even though typographically this is possible. Tone markers are shown as diacritics in Hanifi script. It is written from right to left, following the direction of the Arabic script.

== Characters ==
The Rohingya script has 28 consonant letters and 10 vowel markers.

Letters
𐴅	𐴄	𐴃	𐴂	𐴁	𐴀
𐴋	𐴊	𐴉	𐴈	𐴇	𐴆
𐴑	𐴐	𐴏	𐴎	𐴍	𐴌
𐴗	𐴖	𐴕	𐴔	𐴓	𐴒
	𐴛	𐴚	𐴙	𐴘	

The script has 10 vowel letters.

Vowels
𐴡	𐴠	𐴞	𐴟	𐴝
𐴧	𐴦	𐴥	𐴤	𐴣

The script has three tone markers that are shown as diacritics above the vowel letters. The tone markers indicate high, low or falling tones.

Tone marks
◌𐴦	◌𐴥	◌𐴤

== Letters, their pronunciations, and their equivalents ==
=== Consonants ===
Character	Name	Final	Medial	Latin Script	Arabic Script	Pronunciation	Unicode
𐴀	A	𐴀	ـ𐴀ـ	-	ا, ع	/ɔ/, /ʔ/	U+10D00
𐴁	BA	𐴁𐴢	ـ𐴁ـ	b	ب	/b/	U+10D01
𐴂	PA	𐴂𐴢	ـ𐴂ـ	p	پ	/p/	U+10D02
𐴃	TA	𐴃𐴢	ـ𐴃ـ	t	ت, ط	/t/	U+10D03
𐴄	TTA	𐴄𐴢	ـ𐴄ـ	th	ٹ	/ʈ/	U+10D04
𐴅	JA	𐴅	ـ𐴅ـ	j	ج	/ɟ/	U+10D05
𐴆	CA	𐴆	ـ𐴆ـ	ch	چ	/c/	U+10D06
𐴇	HA	𐴇𐴢	ـ𐴇ـ	h, h'	ح, ه	/h/	U+10D07
𐴈	KHA	𐴈𐴢	ـ𐴈ـ	h, kh	خ	/x/	U+10D08
𐴉	FA	𐴉𐴢	ـ𐴉ـ	f‌	‌ ف	/f/	U+10D09
𐴊	DA	𐴊𐴢	ـ𐴊ـ	d	‌د, ض	/d/	U+10D0A
𐴋	DDA	𐴋	ـ𐴋ـ	dh	ڈ	/ɖ/	U+10D0B
𐴌	RA	𐴌	ـ𐴌ـ	r	ر	/ɾ/	U+10D0C
𐴍	RRA	𐴍	ـ𐴍ـ	ç	ڑ	/ɽ/	U+10D0D
𐴎	ZA	𐴎	ـ𐴎ـ	z	‌ ز, ذ, ظ	/z/	U+10D0E
𐴏	SA	𐴏𐴢	ـ𐴏ـ	s	س, ث, ص	/s/	U+10D0F
𐴐	SHA	𐴐𐴢	ـ𐴐ـ	c	‌ش	/ʃ/	U+10D10
𐴑	KA	𐴑	ـ𐴑ـ	k	‌ ک‌, ق	/k/	U+10D11
𐴒	GA	𐴒𐴢	ـ𐴒ـ	g	‌ گ	/ɡ/	U+10D12
𐴓	LA	𐴓𐴢	ـ𐴓ـ	l	‌ ل	/l/	U+10D13
𐴔	MA	𐴔	ـ𐴔ـ	m	م	/m/	U+10D14
𐴕	NA	𐴕	ـ𐴕ـ	n	ن	/n/	U+10D15
𐴖	WA	𐴖𐴢	ـ𐴖ـ	v	‌ و	/ʋ/, /v/	U+10D16
𐴗	KINNA WA	𐴗𐴢	ـ𐴗ـ	u	‌ و	/u̯/ (for cluster or diphthong)	U+10D17
𐴘	YA	𐴘	ـ𐴘ـ	y	‌ ي	/j/	U+10D18
𐴙	KINNA YA	𐴙𐴢	ـ𐴙ـ	i	‌ ي	/i̯/ (for cluster or diphthong)	U+10D19
𐴚	NGA = gan	𐴚	ـ𐴚ـ	ng	ڠ	/ŋ/	U+10D1A
𐴛	NYA = nayya	𐴛	ـ𐴛ـ	ny	ني	/ɲ/	U+10D1B

=== Vowels and tone markers ===
Character	Name	Latin Script	Arabic Script	Pronunciation	Unicode	Character	Name	Latin Script	Arabic Script	Type	IPA	Unicode
𐴝	aa-for	a	◌َ	/a/	U+10D1D	𐴢	Sakin (Ttura/Les)	none	◌ۡ	Vowel silencer	none	U+10D22
𐴞	i-for	i	‌ ◌ِ	/i/	U+10D1E	𐴣	Na-Khonna	ñ (full letter)	ں, ◌ً, ◌ࣧ, ◌ٍ, ◌ࣩ, ◌ٌ, ◌ࣨ	Nasalization mark	/◌̃/	U+10D23
𐴟	u-for	u	‌ ◌ُ	/u/	U+10D1F	◌𐴤	Harbai	á (acute accent)	‌ ◌࣪ / ◌࣭	Short high tone	/˥/	U+10D24
𐴠	e-for	e	◌ࣦ	/e/	U+10D20	◌𐴥	Tela	áa (double, acute at first)	◌࣫ / ◌࣮	Long falling tone	/˥˩/	U+10D25
𐴡	o-for	o	◌ࣤ, ◌ࣥ	/o/	U+10D21	◌𐴦	Tana	aá (double, acute at second)	◌࣬ / ◌࣯	Long rising tone	/˨˦/	U+10D26
𐴧	Tassi				U+10D27			double consonant (gemination)				

== Numbers ==
Mohammad Hanif and his colleagues also created a set of numerals for the Rohingya language, The numbers are based on the Hindu–Arabic numerals but with some modifications.

Name	sifír	ek	dui	tin	sair	fañs	só	háñt	añctho	no
Name	𐴏𐴞𐴉𐴞𐴥𐴌	𐴀𐴠𐴑	𐴊𐴟𐴘	𐴃𐴞𐴕	𐴏𐴝𐴙𐴌	𐴉𐴝𐴣𐴏𐴢	𐴏𐴡𐴥	𐴇𐴝𐴥𐴣𐴃𐴢	𐴀𐴝𐴣𐴐𐴄𐴡	𐴕𐴡
Name	سِفِ࣭رۡ	اࣦكۡ	دُيۡ	تِنۡ	سَيۡرۡ	فَنسۡ	سࣤ࣪	حَ࣪نتۡ	اَنشۡٹࣤ	نࣤ
Digit	𐴰	𐴱	𐴲	𐴳	𐴴	𐴵	𐴶	𐴷	𐴸	𐴹
Number	0	1	2	3	4	5	6	7	8	9
Unicode	U+10D30	U+10D31	U+10D32	U+10D33	U+10D34	U+10D35	U+10D36	U+10D37	U+10D38	U+10D39

== Four lines ==
The Rohingya script is written from right to left, similar to the Arabic script. There are 28 consonants and 10 vowel markers in the Rohingya language.

Each letter sits differently on the four-line writing system:

- 21 letters are written above the middle three lines
- 6 letters are written within the middle two lines
- 1 letter is written below the middle two lines

Understanding these positions is important for learning proper handwriting and preserving the beauty of the Rohingya script.

=== Above the middle three lines ===
𐴀	𐴁	𐴃	𐴄	𐴅	𐴆	𐴈	𐴋	𐴌	𐴍	𐴎	𐴑	𐴓	𐴔	𐴕	𐴖	𐴗	𐴘	𐴚	𐴛

=== Within the middle two lines ===
𐴂	𐴇	𐴉	𐴊	𐴏	𐴐	𐴒

=== Below the middle two lines ===
𐴙

== Unicode ==
The Hanifi Rohingya script was added to the Unicode Standard in June 2018 with the release of version 11.0. Proposals to include it in Unicode were written by linguist Anshuman Pandey.

The Unicode block for Hanifi Rohingya is U+10D00–U+10D3F and contains 50 characters:

Hanifi Rohingya^{[1]}^{[2]} Official Unicode Consortium code chart (PDF)
	0	1	2	3	4	5	6	7	8	9	A	B	C	D	E	F
U+10D0x	𐴀	𐴁	𐴂	𐴃	𐴄	𐴅	𐴆	𐴇	𐴈	𐴉	𐴊	𐴋	𐴌	𐴍	𐴎	𐴏
U+10D1x	𐴐	𐴑	𐴒	𐴓	𐴔	𐴕	𐴖	𐴗	𐴘	𐴙	𐴚	𐴛	𐴜	𐴝	𐴞	𐴟
U+10D2x	𐴠	𐴡	𐴢	𐴣	𐴤	𐴥	𐴦	𐴧								
U+10D3x	𐴰	𐴱	𐴲	𐴳	𐴴	𐴵	𐴶	𐴷	𐴸	𐴹						
Notes 1.As of Unicode version 18.0 2.Grey areas indicate non-assigned code points

== Fonts ==
- Google's Noto Sans has developed a Rohingya script font called Noto Sans Hanifi Rohingya, available at GitHub.
- Rohingya Hanifi Script font styles Google Playstore
- Rohingya Hanifi Script font styles App Store

== Rohingya keyboard ==
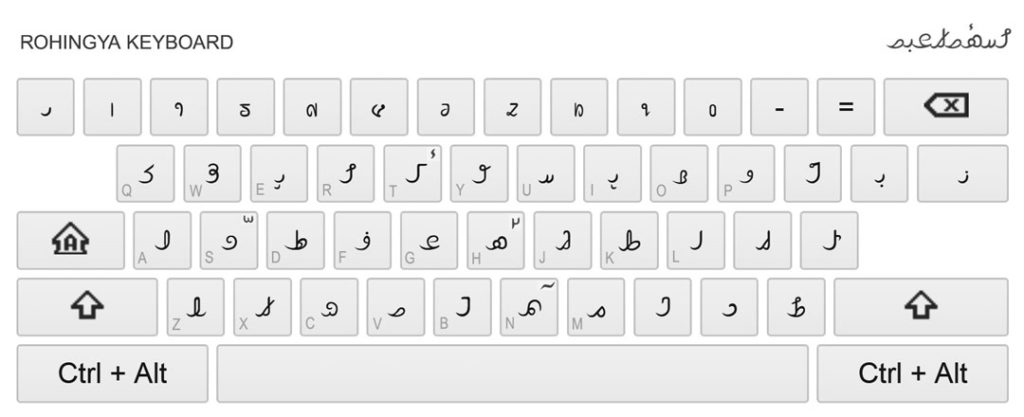
Layout of the Rohingya virtual keyboard.

A virtual keyboard was developed by Google for the Rohingya language in 2019 and allows users to type in the Rohingya script. Ahkter Husin, a Rohingya software developer developed a keyboard for Android phones which is available on Google Play Store. Users can download here. Ahkter Husin and Kyaw Zay Ya Lin Tun developed a keyboard app for iOS which can be found here. The Rohingya Unicode keyboard layout can be found here.

== Sample text ==
The following is a Rohingya translation of Article 1 of the Universal Declaration of Human Rights, comparing the Hanifi and Arabic scripts.

Rohingya in Hanifi Script	.𐴔𐴝𐴕𐴥𐴟𐴙𐴐𐴢 𐴁𐴠𐴒𐴧𐴟𐴤𐴕 𐴀𐴝𐴎𐴝𐴊𐴢 𐴇𐴤𐴞𐴏𐴝𐴉𐴠,. 𐴀𐴝𐴌 𐴀𐴞𐴎𐴧𐴡𐴃𐴢 𐴀𐴠𐴊𐴧𐴠 𐴇𐴤𐴡𐴑 𐴀𐴥𐴡𐴑𐴧𐴡𐴓𐴡𐴃𐴢 ،𐴉𐴤𐴟𐴖𐴝𐴙𐴕𐴧𐴝 𐴇𐴤𐴞𐴏𐴝𐴉𐴠 𐴉𐴡𐴘𐴊𐴝 𐴀𐴥𐴡𐴘𐴧𐴠. 𐴉𐴡𐴃𐴧𐴞𐴤 𐴀𐴞𐴕𐴏𐴝𐴤𐴕𐴡𐴃𐴧𐴟 𐴇𐴡𐴕𐴤𐴡 𐴉𐴡𐴌𐴥𐴡𐴑.𐴏𐴤𐴝𐴌𐴝 𐴀𐴠𐴓𐴝𐴕𐴡𐴃𐴢 𐴀𐴝𐴏𐴤𐴠𐴊𐴠 𐴃𐴝𐴔𐴦𐴝𐴔 𐴇𐴤𐴡𐴑 𐴀𐴥𐴡𐴑𐴧𐴡𐴓𐴢 𐴀𐴠𐴊𐴧𐴠 𐴀𐴝𐴎𐴝𐴊𐴞 𐴀𐴡𐴑𐴧𐴡𐴓𐴢 𐴓𐴡𐴘 𐴉𐴝𐴥𐴘𐴊𐴝 𐴒𐴡𐴌𐴥𐴡𐴕𐴡𐴌 𐴇𐴤𐴡𐴑 𐴀𐴝𐴌, 𐴃𐴝𐴌𐴤𐴝𐴌𐴠, 𐴊𐴞𐴓𐴢 𐴀𐴠𐴊𐴧𐴠 𐴊𐴠𐴔𐴝𐴑 𐴊𐴞𐴘𐴧𐴠𐴤. 𐴀𐴥𐴡𐴃𐴡𐴓𐴧𐴝, 𐴃𐴝𐴌𐴤𐴝𐴃𐴧𐴟 𐴀𐴠𐴑𐴎𐴡𐴕 𐴓𐴡𐴘. 𐴀𐴝𐴌 𐴀𐴠𐴑𐴎𐴡𐴕 𐴁𐴤𐴝𐴘 𐴇𐴤𐴞𐴏𐴝𐴉𐴠 𐴔𐴦𐴝𐴔𐴠𐴓𐴝 𐴒𐴡𐴌𐴥𐴡𐴕 𐴏𐴝𐴦.
Rohingya in Rohingya Arabic Script	مَنُ࣪شۡ بࣦگُّ࣪نۡ اَزَدۡ حِ࣭سَفࣦ، اَرۡ عِزّࣤتۡ اَرۡدࣦ حࣤ࣪قۡ اࣤ࣪كّࣤلۡ اࣤ࣪تۡ، فُ࣪وَ࣪نَّ࣪ࢬ حِ࣭سَفࣦ فࣤيۡدَ اࣤ࣪يّࣦ. فࣤتِّ اِنۡسَ࣪نۡ اࣤ࣪تُّ هࣤنࣤ࣪ فࣤرࣤ࣪كۡ سَ࣪رَ࣪ عࣦلَنۡ اࣤتۡ اَسࣦ࣭دࣦ تَمَ࣪مۡ حࣤ࣪قۡ اࣤ࣪كّࣤلۡ اَرۡدࣦ اَزَدِ اࣤ࣪كّࣤلۡ لࣤيۡ فَ࣫يۡدَ࣪ گࣤرࣤ࣫نۡ اࣤ࣪رۡ حࣤ࣪قۡ اَسࣦ࣭. اَرۡ، تَرَ࣪رࣦ࣭ دِلۡ اَرۡدࣦ دࣦمَكۡ دِيࣦ࣭ اࣤ࣪تࣤ࣪لَّ، تَرَ࣪تُّ࣪ اࣦك زࣤنۡ لࣤيۡ اَرۡ اࣦكۡزࣤنۡ بَ࣪يۡ حِ࣭سَفࣦ مَامَلَ گࣤرࣤ࣫نۡ سَ࣬.
English original:	"All human beings are born free and equal in dignity and rights. They are endowed with reason and conscience and should act towards one another in a spirit of brotherhood."
