= Amer El-Hanafi =

Egyptian weightlifter (born 1934)

Personal information
- Nationality: Egyptian
- Born: 16 December 1934; Cairo, Egypt

Sport
- Sport: Weightlifting

Amer El-Hanafi (16 December 1934, date of death unknown) was an Egyptian weightlifter. He competed at the 1960 Summer Olympics and the 1964 Summer Olympics. El-Hanafi died prior to 2013.
