= Hanifa Kawooya =

Ugandan politician

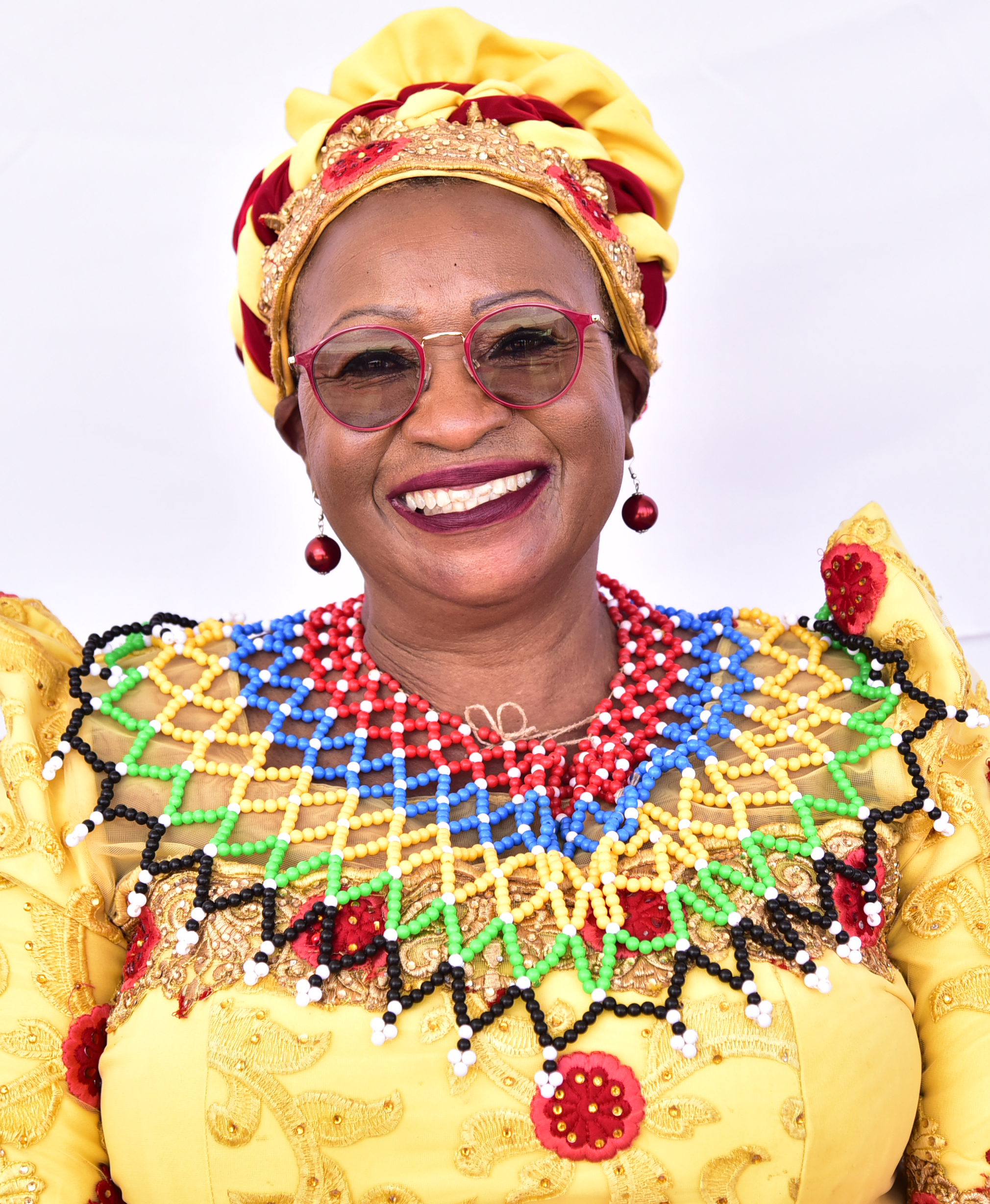
- Born: 21 January 1957 (age 69)
- Citizenship: Uganda
- Education: Bachelor's degree, Master's degree
- Alma mater: Nkumba University
- Occupation: Politician
- Political party: National Resistance Movement

Hanifa Kawooya (21 January 1957) is a Ugandan politician and an administrator. She is the district woman representative of Sembabule. Kawooya belongs to National Resistance Movement (NRM) political party.

== Background and education ==
In 2004, she attained a bachelor's degree of arts in Development Studies from Nkumba University. She later joined and completed Master of International Relations and Diplomacy in the same university in 2007.

== Career and political life ==
From 1993 to 1995, she worked as the Constituent Assembly Delegate at National Assembly. Between 1998 and 2002, she served as the Executive Publicity Secretary at National Women Council. From 1980 to 1992, she was employed as the Sales and Marketing Officer at Uganda Airlines & Zambia Airways. From 2016 to date, she has been the member of Pan African Parliament. Hanifa also worked as the Caucus Treasurer of the National Resistance Movement. She was also the speaker of Sembabule District Local Government. She served as the Senior Principal Revenue Officer of Uganda Revenue Authority. In 2001, she worked as the Deputy Resident District Commissioner of Rakai district. From 2001 to date, she as served as the Member of Parliament at the Parliament of Uganda.

== Additional role ==
She serves on the following additional role at the parliament of Uganda;

- Member of committee on Equal opportunities
- Member of committee on Foreign Affairs

== See also ==
- Sembabule District
- List of members of the ninth Parliament of Uganda
- List of members of the tenth Parliament of Uganda
- Parliament of Uganda
