= Culture of Jharkhand =

Culture of the Indian state of Jharkhand

The state of Jharkhand in India is located in the eastern part of the country and is known for its vivid culture, distinct paintings, traditions and festivals.

== Languages ==
Hindi is the official language of Jharkhand. There are many regional and tribal languages in Jharkhand.

The regional languages that belong to the Indo-Aryan branch; in Jharkhand, they are Khortha/Magahi(most spoken language of Jharkhand), Nagpuri, and Kudmali spoken by the Sadan, the Indo-Aryan ethnic groups of Chotanagpur. Other Indo-Aryan languages include Bhojpuri, Angika, Bengali, and Odia. The languages that belong to the Austroasiatic branch are Mundari, Santali, Bhumij and Ho. The languages that belong to the Dravidian language family are Kurukh and Malto.

== Cuisine ==
The staple foods in Jharkhand are rice, dal, vegetables, and tubers. Some dishes include Chilka Roti, Malpua, Dhooska, Arsa roti, and Pitha. Rugra (a type of mushroom) and bamboo shoots are also used as vegetables. The leaves of the Munga tree (Moringa oleifera) and the Koinar tree (Bauhinia variegata) are used as leafy vegetables or Saag.

Local alcoholic drinks are Handia made from rice and Mahua ,daru made from flowers of the Mahua tree.

== Festivals ==
=== Chhath Puja ===
Chhath Puja is celebrated on the sixth day of the lunar month of Kartika (October–November). It's a major festival in Jharkhand. The rituals are observed over four days. They include holy bathing, fasting and abstaining from drinking water (vrata), standing in water, and offering prasad (prayer offerings) and arghya to the setting and rising sun. Some devotees also perform a prostration march as they head for the river banks. Chhath puja is dedicated to the sun god "Surya" and his sister "Chhathi Maiya".

=== Karam ===
Karam is a major native harvest festival of Jharkhand. It is celebrated on the 11th day of a full moon of the month of Bhado by the tribal (Munda, Bhumij, and Oraon) and the Sadan (Khortha, Nagpuri, Kurmali-speaking group) people of Jharkhand. During this festival, people bring branches of the Karam tree to the village and then place them on the ground. The branches are washed with milk and handia, and decorated with garlands, curd, rice, flowers and grains. The village priest "Pahan" offer sacrifice of Karam devta for good harvest.

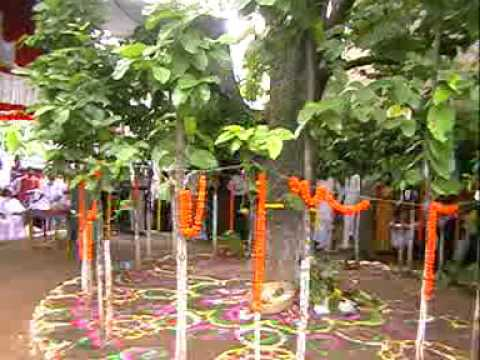
Karam puja in Jharkhand

=== Jitia ===
During the festival of Jitia, mothers fast for the well being of their children. It is celebrated from the seventh to the ninth lunar day of Krishna-Paksha, in the month of Ashwin.

=== Nawakhani ===
Nawakhani is an important festival that occurs in Jharkhand. During this festival, grains are eaten following the harvest.

=== Sohrai/Bandna ===
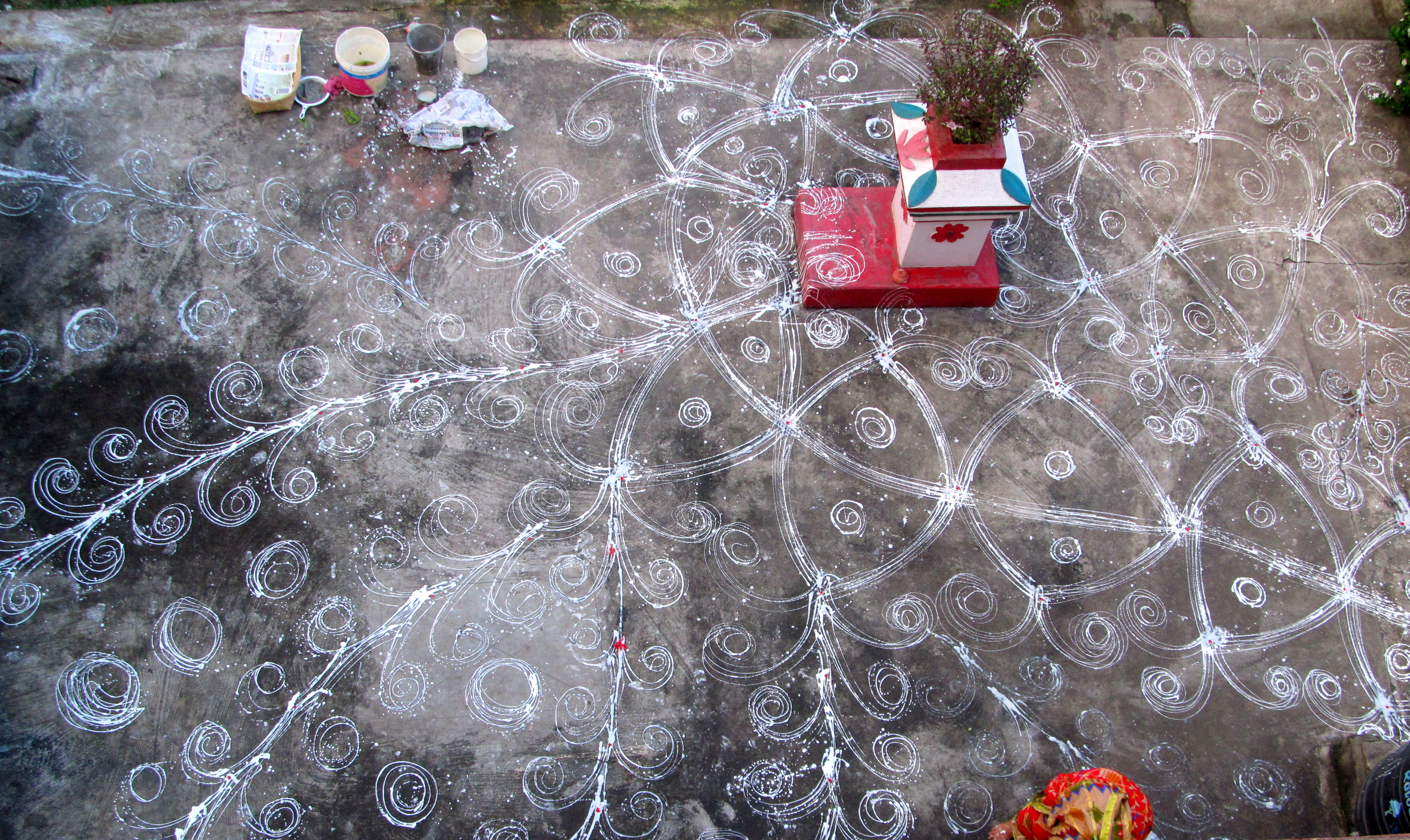
Chawk Pura During Bandna Festival in a Courtyard

Sohrai is a cattle festival of Jharkhand's. It is celebrated during the Amavasya of the month of Kartik. It coincides with the Diwali festival. People fast throughout the day, and bathe their cattle. In the evening, sacrifices are offered to the cattle deity.

=== Holi ===
Phaguwa, or Holi, is the spring festival which falls in the month of Phalgun. In spring, people collect sal flower blossoms and place them on their roofs. There are special songs and dances for this festival. Holi/Fagua is also celebrated as new year in North Jharkhand along with South Bihar. The Fagua, folk song is also sung during holi to welcome new year.

=== Other festivals ===
Other festivals include Tusu, Durga Puja, Diwali, Dussehra, Kali Puja, Sarhul, Baha, Ashadhi, Jantal and Sendra festivals.

Durga Puja celebration in Ranchi, Jharkhand

An idol of Goddess Kali worshipped during Kali Puja in Madhupur, Jharkhand

== Folk dances ==
Documentary video of some folk dance of Jharkhand

There are several folk dances in Jharkhand, including Jhumair, Domkach, Lahasua, Vinsariya, Jhumta, Fagua, Firkal, Painki, and Chhau.

- Jhumair: Being a popular folk dance in Jharkhand, it is performed during harvest and festival season in which people hold hands and dance in circles. It is folk dance of Sadan, native Indo-Aryan ethnic groups of Jharkhand. The musical instruments used in this festival include Mandar, Dhol, Bansi, Nagara, Dhak, Shehnai, and Khartal. There are varieties to this dance, such as Khortha Jhumair, Nagpuri Jhumair, and Kurmali Jhumair. The Nagpuri version also have Mardani Jhumar and Janani Jhumar as varieties.
- Domkach: A Nagpuri folk dance performed by the family of the bridegroom on the occasion of marriage. The theme of the songs carried in this dance is satirical. Some of the many songs played are ek haria, dohri, adh ratia, bihanwa.
- Paiki: Also known as Paika is a nagpuri martial dance performed by men wearing ghungroos. The dance is composed of sword and shield carrying accompanied by music played on the Nagara, Dhak, and Shehnai.
- Chhau dance: A semi-classical dance with martial, tribal, and folk traditions. Seraikella Chhau is found in Seraikella district of Jharkhand.
- Mundari dance: A dance performed by the Munda tribe during harvest and festival season.
- Santali dance: A dance performed by the Santal tribe during harvest and festival season.

Musical instruments used include Mandar, Dholki, Bansi, Nagara, Dhak, Shehnai, Khartal, and Narsinga, among others.

A Khadia Bidaai song, sung when the bride bids farewell to her father's home

== Paintings ==
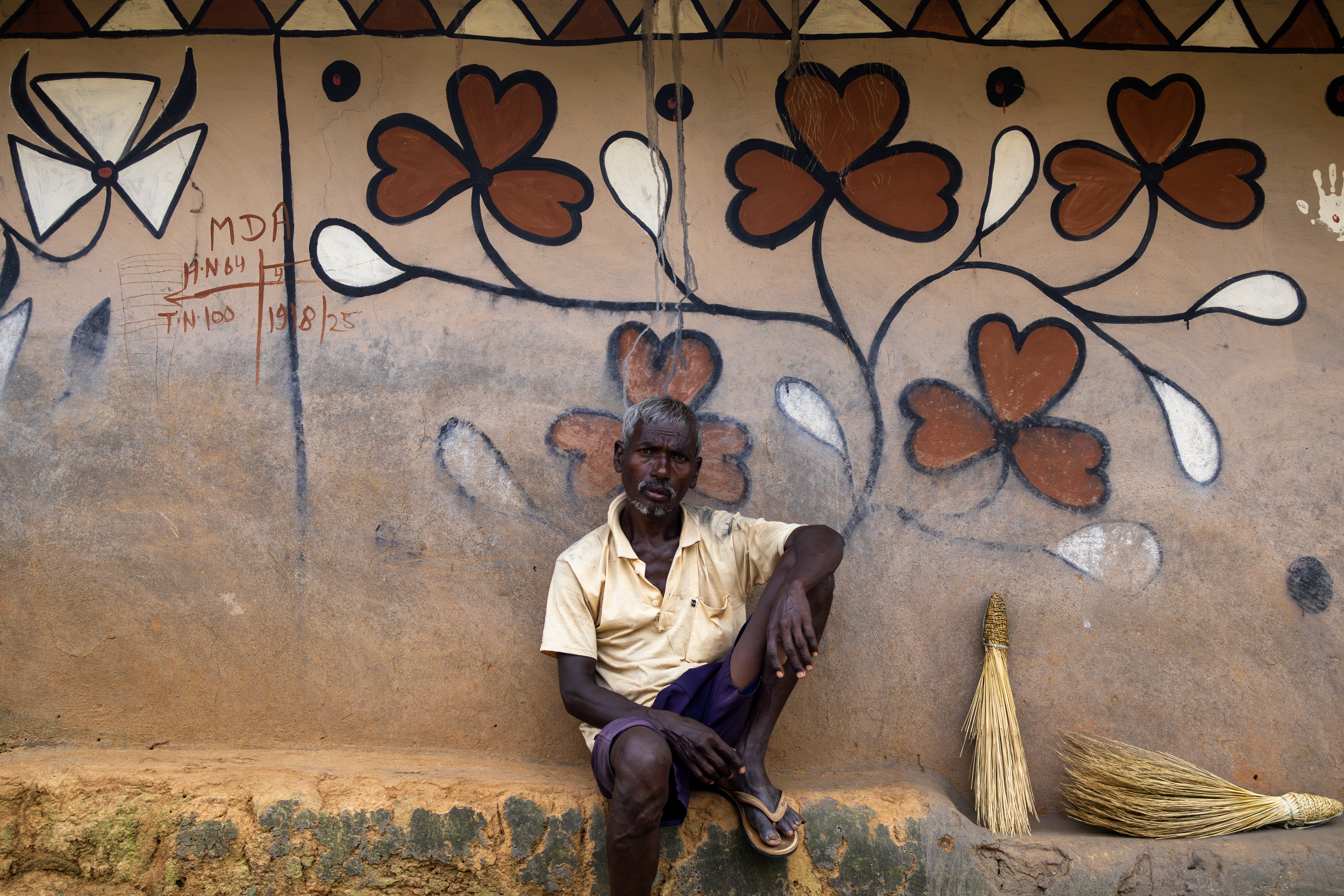
Sohrai wall painting at Isko Village, Hazaribagh district, Jharkhand

Sohrai painting is performed during the Sohrai festival. Various designs are painted in courtyards and on walls.

== Tattoo ==
The local tattoo tradition of Godna is an essential part of local tradition.

== Cinema ==
Jharkhand produces many films in regional languages, including Nagpuri, Khortha, Santali, Ho, and Kurukh. The first feature film of Jharkhand was Aakarant, made under the banner of Drishyantar International in 1988. The first Nagpuri film was Sona Kar Nagpur (1994), produced and directed by Dhananjay Nath Tiwari.
