= Folk dances of Jharkhand =

Folk dances of a state in India

Folk dances of Jharkhand represent its vibrant culture and tradition. There are various folk dance in the state of Jharkhand which are performed during harvest season, festival and social gatherings. Some folk and tribal dances in Jharkhand are Jhumair, Mardana Jhumair, Janani Jhumair, Domkach, Lahasua, Jhumta, Fagua, Paika, Chhau, Firkal, Mundari and Santali.

Documentary videos of some folk dance of Jharkhand

== List of Folk dances ==
Some folk dances are as follows:

=== Jhumair ===
Jhumair is popular folk dance of Jharkhand. It is performed during harvest season and festivals. Musical Instruments used are Mandar, Dhol, Nagara, Dhak, Bansi Shehnai.

=== Mardani Jhumair ===
Mardani Jhumar is Nagpuri folk dance performed by men. Men wear ghungroo, hold sword and dance in the circle.

=== Janani Jhumair ===
Janani Jhumair is Nagpuri folk dance performed by women. The dance has feminine grace.

=== Domkach ===
Domkach is a folk dance performed in Jharkhand in marriages and festivals.

=== Fagua ===
Fagua is a folk dance performed by both men and women during festival of Fagua. The musical instruments used are Mandar, Dhol and Bansi(flute).

=== Paiki ===
Paiki is a Nagpuri ceremonial martial dance. It is performed by men. Men wear ghungroo, dance holding sword and shield. Music instruments used are Nagara, Dhak, and Shehnai.

=== Chhau dance ===
Chhau dance is a semi-classical Indian dance with tribal and folk tradition, Chhau dance form of manbhum style is found in Nimdih Block of Saraikela kharsawan district of Jharkhand since undivided Manbhum district. Some famous Chhau dance artist are Shri Sudhir Kumar, Shri Paresh Kumar from Jamdih Village, Shri Chandi Mahato from Kushputul Village of Nimdih block.

Sukesh Mukherjee, Assistant Teacher and Mathematics Textbooks Writer of Jharkhand Government has played a remarkable role in the field of Chhau dance. He has performed chhau dance in Centre for Cultural Resources and Training, Udaipur, Rajasthan which is under the Ministry of Culture, Government of India.

=== Firkal dance ===
Firkal is a martial art folk-dance of Bhumij tribes. The main instruments of Firkal are swords, arrows, bows and shields. It can be found in Potka block in East Singhbhum district of Jharkhand.

=== Mundari dance ===
Munda tribe have its own dance which performed during harvest season and festival accompanied by musical Instrument Madal, Nagara and Bansi. Munda refer to their dance and song as durang and Susun respectively Mundari folk dance are Jadur and Jena.

=== Santali dance ===
Santal tribe have its own unique dance. They performed it during harvest season and festival accompanied by instruments such as Madal and Nagara..

=== Kurukh dance ===
Kurukh tribe perform folk dances during different occasions such as harvesting, festival, marriage etc. In Kurukh language dance is called "dandi". Some folk dance of Kurukh tribe are Jagra Matha, Jadur, Karam dandi, khaddi and dudhiya etc.

Ranga is also folk dance of Jharkhand.
