= Nagpuri culture =

Nagpuri culture refers to the culture of the Nagpuria people, the native speakers of the Nagpuri language, which includes literature, festivals, folk song and dance. It is also referred to as the culture related to the Nagpuri language.

A Sadri/Nagpuri bidaai (farewell) song

== Language ==
Nagpuri is the native language of Sadan, the Indo-Aryan ethnolinguistic group of Chotanagpur. It is spoken in the western and central Chota Nagpur plateau region. It is spoken by around 12 million people, 5 million as a native language and 7 million as a second language. The first evidence of poetry written in this language is from the 17th century. The Nagvanshi king Raghunath Shah and Dalel Singh, the king of Ramgarh were the poets. Some prominent poets were Hanuman Singh, Jaigovind Mishra, Barju Ram Pathak, Ghasiram Mahli and Das Mahli. Some prominent writers in the modern period are Praful Kumar Rai, Lal Ranvijay Nath Shahdeo, Bisheshwar Prasad Keshari, Girdhari Ram Gonjhu and Sahani Upendra Pal Singh.

== Festivals ==
Several festivals are observed by Sadans including Ashadhi Puja, Karam, Jitiya, Chhath, Nawakhani, Sohrai/Diwali, Surjahi Puja, Makar Sankranti, Fagun, Bad Pahari and Sarhul.

== Folk music and dance ==
=== Folk dance ===
Some Nagpuri folk dances are jhumair, mardani jhumar, janani jhumar, domkach, angnai, fagua, jadur, matha, natua and paiki. Paiki is ceremonial martial folk dance performed at marriages and other occasions in the Sadan community. The musical instruments used are dhol, mandar, bansi, nagara, dhak, shehnai, khartal, and narsinga. These instruments are traditionally made by the Ghasi and Mahli community. Akhra is important part of the Nagpuri culture which is where people dance in village. The Ghasi community has played important role in preservation of folk music. They have been playing musical instruments in marriage ceremonies.

=== Folk song ===
Nagpuri folk songs can be divided into four categories: seasonal, festival, Sanskar and dance songs. Seasonal songs are sung according to season, such as Udasi, Pawas, Fagua. Pawas songs are sung during the rainy season, Fagua during spring till Holi festival and Udasi during summer season. Festival songs are sung during festivals such as Karam, Jitiya, Teej, Sohrai. Sanskar songs are sung during major rites such as child birth and weddings. Dance songs are dance oriented such as Mardani Jhumar, Janani Jhumar, Domkach and Khemta.

Theth Nagpuri is a genre of typical Nagpuri music which is based on traditional ragas of folk songs such as Jhumar, Pawas, Udasi and Fagua. It is connected to the Nagpuri tradition. Notable exponent of Nagpuri folk music and dance are Govind Sharan Lohra, Mahavir Nayak and Mukund Nayak.

==

== Household goods and tools ==
Sadan people traditionally use household items of earthenware, iron and bronze which includes gagri, handi, chuka, dhakni for cooking. Hunting tools used are nets, kumni, bow arrow, sword, spear and tangi.

== Cuisine ==
The Staple food of the region is rice. People also eat forest products such as wild flowers and fruits. Some traditional dishes are Chhilka Roti, Arsa roti, Malpua, Dhooska, Til laddu and Dudhauri. Some traditional leafy vegetables or Saag are Khesari, Kohnda, Koinar, Methi, Munga, Poi, Putkal and Sarla saag. Some wild edible wild flowers are as Jilhur phool and Sanai phool (Crotalaria juncea). Gunda is a traditional dish which is a powder of leafy vegetables which are dried and grinded and made into soup with rice water. Some Gunda are Chakod gunda, Munga Gunda and Sarla gunda etc. Karil, the new bamboo shoots are edible. Some edible mushrooms are khukdi, especially the white mushroom, Putu (white puffball) and rugda (puffball), which grow during the rainy season in field and forest. Mahua flower is edible and its seed used for preparation of oil. The traditional alcoholic beverages are Handi, a rice bear and Mahua daru, a wine prepared by Mahua flowers. People drink it during festivals and marriage feasts.

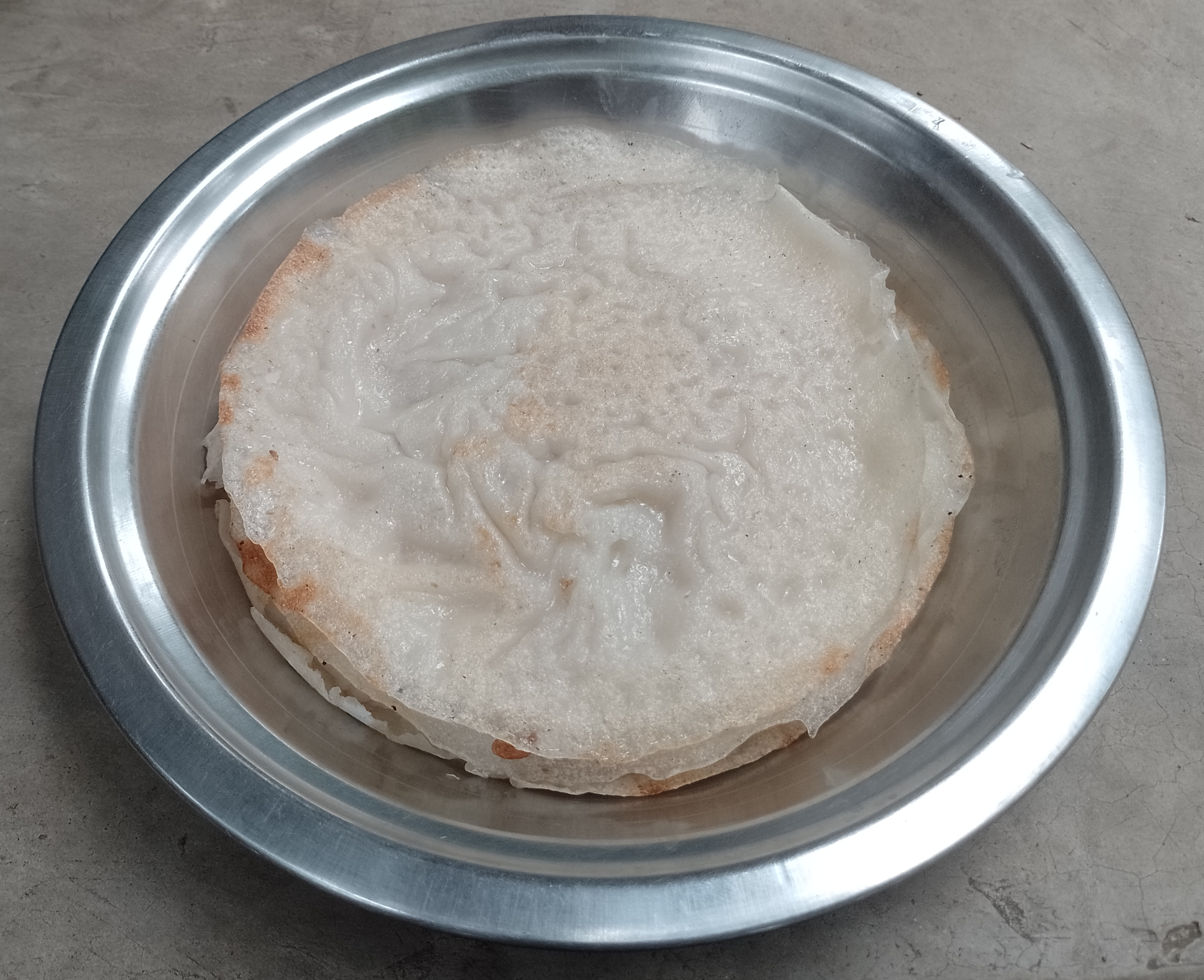
Chilka Roti, traditional bread of Chotanagpur

== Religion ==
Sadan people observe festivals such as Asari, Karam, Jitiya, Nawakhani, Sohrai, Fagun and Bad Pahari. In these festivals the elder of family members propitates Sun, Moon, ancestors and other deities by offering sacrifices and liquor. In the village festival, the rituals are performed by the village priest "Pahan" and his assistant "Pujar", who offer sacrifice to village deity. According to scholars, the deities which are not found in Hindu scriptures are deities of folk tradition which is a non-vedic tradition. According to June McDaniel, folk Hinduism is based on local traditions and cults of local deities and is the oldest, non-literate system. It is a pre-vedic tradition extending back to prehistoric times, or before the writing of the Vedas. The influence of Vedic religion reached in the region during the reign of the Nagvanshi. The Nagvanshi kings constructed several temples during their reign and invited Brahmins from various parts of the country for priestly duties. But rituals in the village are carried out by village priest Pahan.

Megasthenes, the Greek Ambassador to Maurya, Emperor Chandragupta Maurya, mentioned India in his book Indica. According to him, Indians make wine from rice, drink rice bear in sacrifice and mainly eat rice pottage. In 1989, the Jharkhand Co-ordination committee (JCC), who was instrumental in the demand for a separate Jharkhand state in front of the central government, also stated in their paper that Sadan may be the earliest Aryan population and could be the subcategoriable as Naga people as they differ from dominant Aryan group and did't strictly follow Brahmanical religion.

== Marriage tradition ==
Nagpuri weddings are held for several days. Prior to marriage, the groom's relatives go bride's home to see and negotiate for marriage and a token amount (bride price) is paid by the groom's family to the family of the bride. Some wedding rituals are madwa, baraat, parghani, sindoordan, bidai. Domkach folk dance is performed during the wedding. The musical instruments used in the nagpuri wedding are nagara, dhak and shehnai.

The practice of bride price was mentioned in Ramayana and Mahabharata where during weddings of Kaikeyi, Gandhari and Madri, bride price was given. The practice of giving bride price was considered Asura Vivah in Smriti texts such as Grihas Sutra and Dharma Sutra.

== Traditional administrative System ==
In Chotoanagpur, there was a traditional administrative system to govern villages known as to the Parha system. In the Parha system, there were the posts of Mahto (village chief), Pahan (village priest), Pujar or Pani bharwa (assistant of Pahan), Bhandari (treasurer), Chowkidar (watchman), Diwan (minister) and Raja (king). During the reign of Nagvanshi, the landowners were known as Bhuinhar. Bhuinhar refers to the first people who cleared forest, built farmland and houses in a village. Sadans were in the post of Diwan, Thakur, Pandey, Karta (executive), Lal, Mahato, Pahan and Raja.

The owner of lands known as Bhuinhars. Mahto made assessments and settlement of all land not held by hereditary cultivators. He collects rent. Pahan, the village priest, does all the rituals for village deities. Bhandari assists with the collection of rents and summoning ryots who work for farmers or Zamindars. There was Gorait, who was a messenger to Zamindar, and Kotwar, who was a police officer in each village. The village has a blacksmith and a Gowala who rear the cattle of the village.

== Cinema ==
Nagpuri language films have been produced since 1992. Sona Kar Nagpur (1992) was the first nagpuri film produced and directed by Dhananjay Nath Tiwari. The Nagpuri cinema faces several challenges, such as lack of funds and lack of infrastructure, as the majority of the audience reside in villages. Despite all these, several films are produced per year and few get released.

== See also ==
- Culture of Jharkhand
- Culture of India
