= Ghasi =

Caste in India

Regions with significant populations
- India
- Jharkhand: 1,50,520
- Odisha: 1,14,066

Languages
- Nagpuri, Kurmali, Odia

Religion
- Hinduism

Related ethnic groups
- Ghasiya

Ghasi is a caste found in Jharkhand, Chhattisgarh, Odisha and West Bengal. They are traditionally village musicians and caretakers of horses. They are known as Ghasiya in Uttar Pradesh.

== Etymology ==
The name ghasi derive from ghas which means grass. In past, they were cutting grass to feed horses.

== History ==
The Ghasi caste is found in Jharkhand, Chhattisgarh, Odisha and West Bengal. They are also found in Uttar Pradesh known as Ghasiya. They were serving Nagvanshi as militia, musician and ritual specialist. They also worked as agricultural worker and palanquin bearers. The title of Naik was bestowed upon them by Nagvanshi kings due their expertise in music. The word Naik derived from Naikha which means leader of a band. The title of Sahani or Sohani Rajput was given to them by a Nagvanshi king because they had quenched his thrist by providing water.

According to Dr.Ball, they are known for their gold washing and playing musical instruments in Singhbhum district. They were treated as untouchable due to their profession of beating drums and disposing dead animals.

== Present Circumstances ==
They are found in the state of Jharkhand, Chhattisgarh, Odisha and West Bengal. In West Bengal, they are concentrated in Purulia district. They are an endogamous group. They are patrilocal and patrilinial. They practice clan exogamy. They have number of clans such as Bagh (tiger), Bangar, Bhainsa (buffalo), Hathi (elephant), Kachhua (turtle), Kasriar (bronze), Katihari, Maltiar (a flower), Mohdiar (honey bee), Nag (Cobra), Pandki (dove), Sindur (vermillion), Simarlasa (simal tree gum), Sonwan (gold water) etc.

== Culture ==
They speak Nagpuri and Kurmali in Jharkhand and Odia in Western Odisha. Their traditional occupation was caretaker of horses along with village musician. They along with Mahli community are the traditional maker of musical instruments such as dhol, mandar, nagara and dhak etc. They play musical instruments in weddings. They have an important role in the preservation of ethnic music. Their folk dance are Jhumar and Domkach. They practice Nacni dance and Chhau dance in Purulia of West Bengal. They observe the festivals of Holi, Diwali, Karma, Sarhul, Ramnavami. They practice animism with a mixture of Hinduism.

== Official classification ==
In 1931, during British Period, they were listed as semi hinduised aboriginal. In 1936, they were listed as Backward tribe in Chotanagpur division of Bihar. In Patna division, Palamu, Hazaribagh, Manbhum and Bengal, they were included in Scheduled Caste. They are included in the list of Scheduled Castes in Jharkhand, Bihar, Chhattisgarh, Odisha and West Bengal.

== Notable people ==
- Mukund Nayak, folk artist
- Nandlal Nayak, music composer and director
