= Mahavir Nayak =

Indian Singer (born 1942)

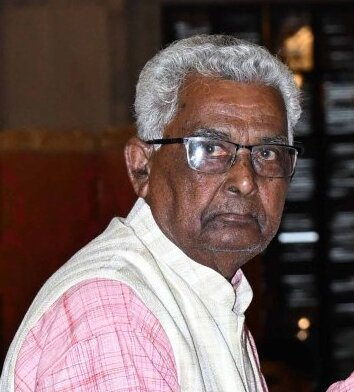
- Nayak in 2025
- Born: Mahavir Nayak; 26 March 1942 (age 84); Uruguttu, Kanke, Ranchi, Bihar (now Jharkhand), India
- Other name: Mahabir Nayak
- Occupations: Singer; Songwriter
- Years active: 1962 - present
- Known for: Typical Nagpuri music
- Awards: Padma Shri (2025); Sangeet Natak Akademi Award (2022); Praful Samman (2019); Lok Kala Ratna Award (2014)

Mahavir Nayak (born 26 March 1942), is an Indian Nagpuri-singer and songwriter. He is an exponent of Theth Nagpuri music, which is a genre of typical Nagpuri music, based on traditional Nagpuri folk music. He is recognised for his Nagpuri Bhinsariya, Faguwa, Pawas and Mardani Jhumar ragas. He is the recipient of Sangeet Natak Akademi Amrit Award (2022), Lok Kala Ratna Award (2014) and Praful Samman (2019) for his contribution in folk music. In 2025, he was awarded Padma Shri, India's fourth highest civilian award in the field of arts.

== Early life ==
He was born in the village of Uruguttu in the Kanke block of Ranchi district on 26 March 1942, on the day of Ramnavami. He belongs to Ghasi community. His father, Khuddu Nayak, was a folk singer and Mardani Jhumar dancer. He learnt folk music in the arkhra, the village ground. He was getting chances to sing songs in school on Saturday. He was appreciated by his friends for his songs and he wished to become a singer.

== Career ==
He joined Heavy Engineering Corporation in 1963. He started writing songs. He tried to preserve traditional nagpuri music. He is the singer of theth nagpuri songs, which is typical Nagpuri music based on traditional Nagpuri folk music since 1962. He was invited by Bisheshwar Prasad Keshari to the Nagpuri Sansthan, where he came to know about the poetry of Nagpuri poets such as Hanuman Singh, Barju Ram, Ghasi Ram Mahli and Das Mahli. Then he started composing nagpuri music with Dr Bishweswar Prasad Keshari. He started to sing on stage in the year of 1976. In 1977, he started organising stage programs and gave the elderly singers the opportunity to sing. He has sung in more than 1000 stage shows. He is known as king of Vinsaria, which is a title given by the people of Simdega district.

He gave an audition and joined the radio and television show in 1984. Then he sang several songs on radio and television. He also composed many songs for the movement of the separate Jharkhand state.

In 1985, he established the Kunjban organisation with folk artist Mukund Nayak and other artists, to teach traditional nagpuri music to the young generation. He went to Taipei for a show in 1992.

On 31 March 2021, he retired from HEC. He had written around 300 songs and collected 5000 songs written by old poets. He also organised the Nagpuri poet conference in Hatia. He has been a member of Chotanagpur Sanskritik Sangh since 1971. He published the magazine Darpan in 1993, which has songs written by many old poets. According to him, the Theth Nagpuri music is a form of classical music. Its song and dance are based on festivals and seasons such as Jhumar, Pawas, Udasi and Fagua. It includes social, ethics, culture and literature. Modern nagpuri songs have been affected by pollution.

== Awards and honours ==
In 2014, he was awarded the Lok Kala Ratna Award. In 2020, he was awarded Praful Samman for the year 2019. In 2022, he was awarded the Sangeet Natak Akademi Award.

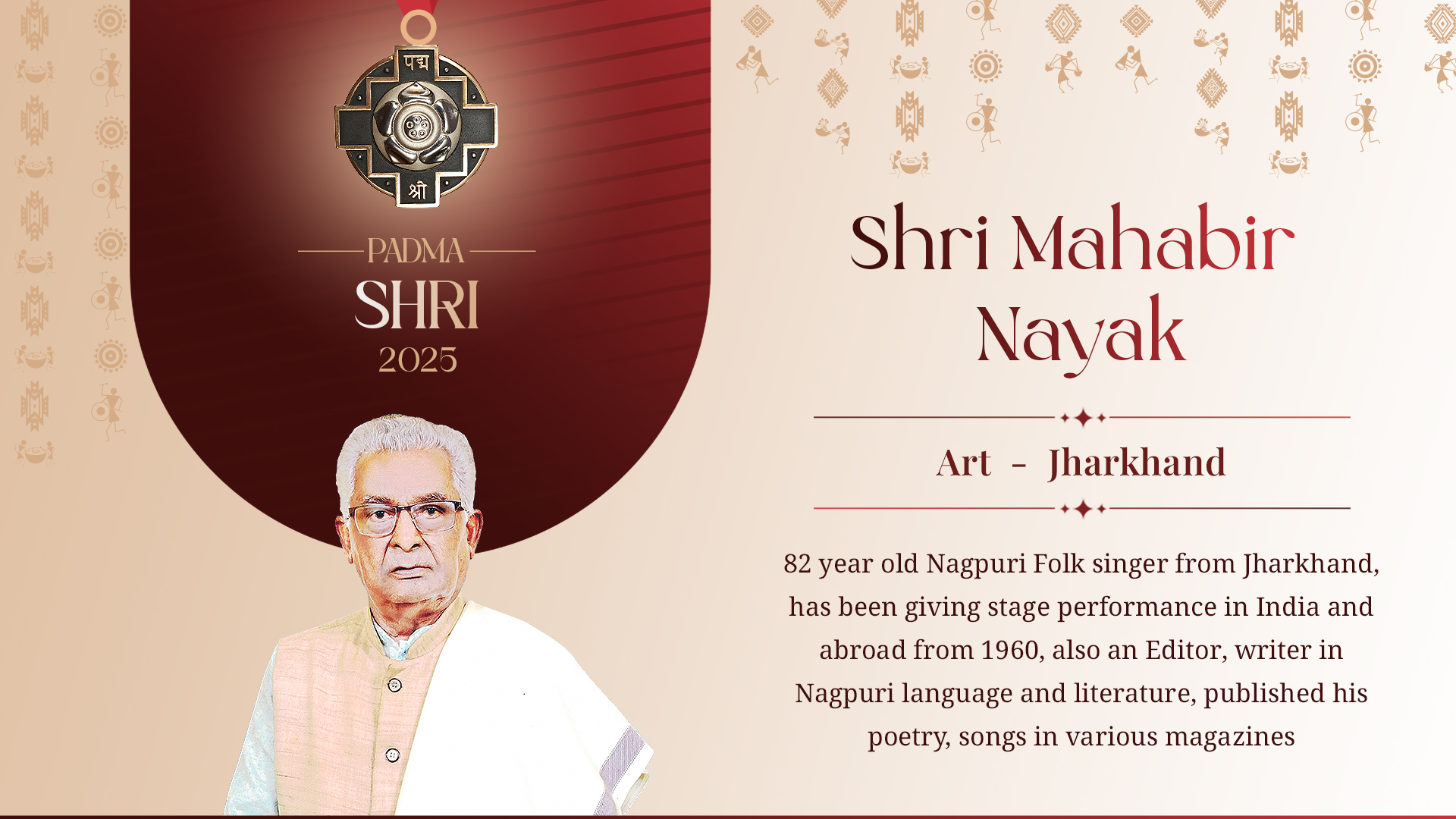
Mahabir Nayak Padma Shri

In 2025, he was awarded Padma Shri, India's fourth highest civilian award in the field of arts.
