= List of folk dances of Odisha =

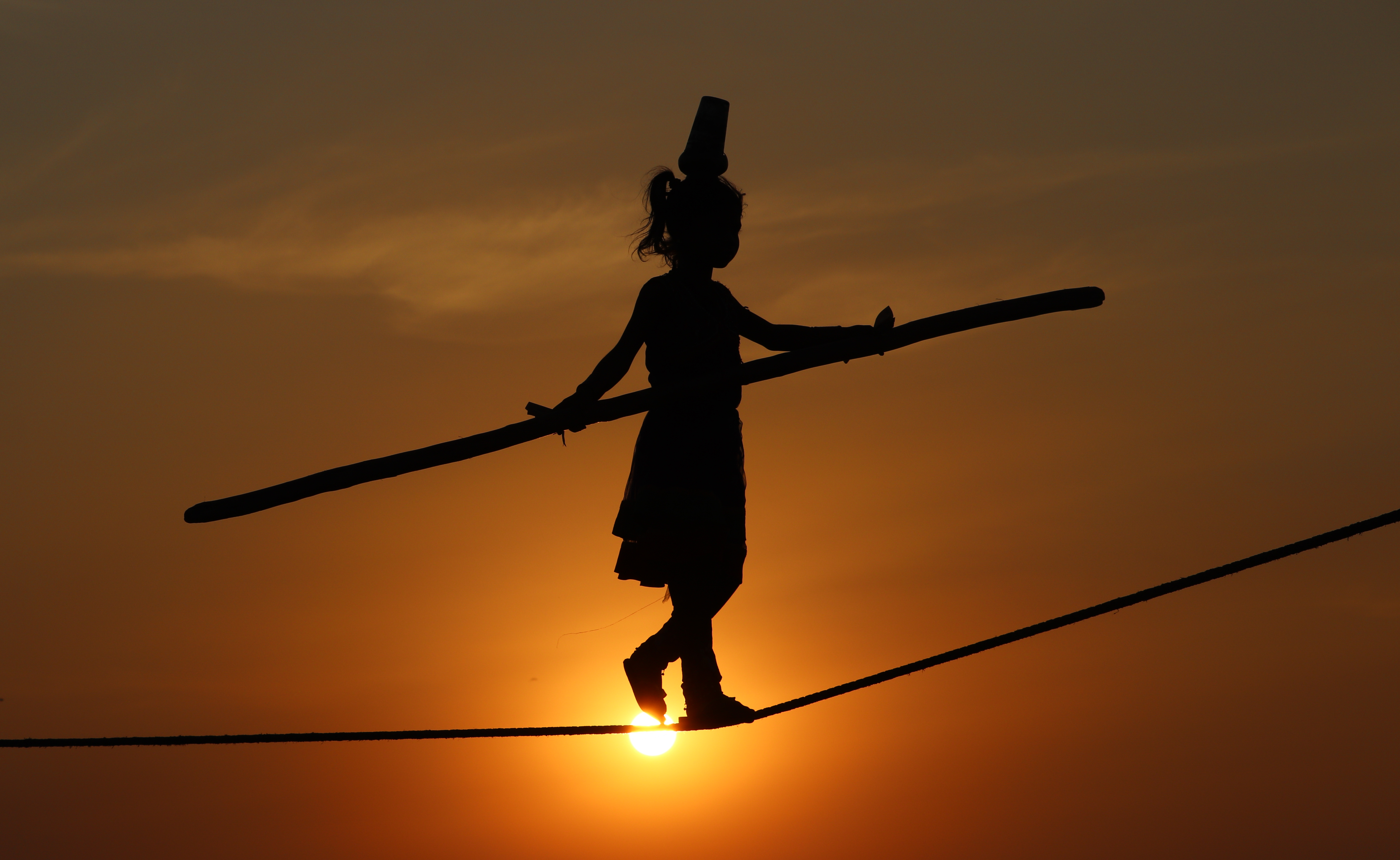
Indian tightrope girl performing folk art Baunsa Rani

This is the main list of folk dances of the Indian state of Odisha. It is a non-categorized, index list of specific dances. There may also be listed dances which could either be considered a specific dance or a family of related dances, depending on your perspective. For example, Jatra, Chhau dance and Ravana Chhaya can be considered a single dance style or a family of related dances. The purpose of the page is to have as complete an index as possible.

Specific dances are listed below in alphabetical order the districts of Odisha.

== Anugul ==
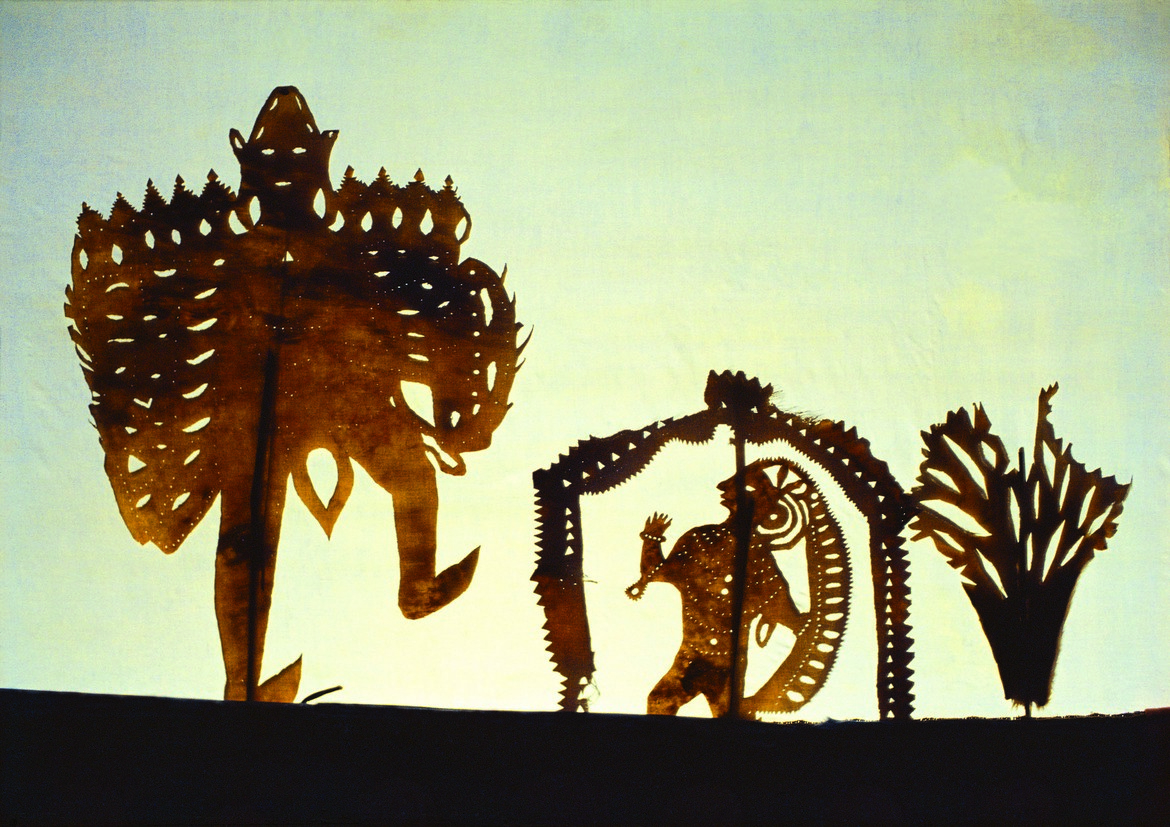
Ravana Chhaya: Ravana tries to kidnap Sita

- Rabana Chhaya
- Changu (Pauti Bhuyan- Palahada)
- Dhol Nishan Dance
- Danda Venakar Nacha
- Kharia Dance
- Singha Badya
- Animal Pallet

== Balangir ==
- Bajasal
- Bangrori
- Chhilolai
- Dalkhai
- Danda Nacha
- Dhaap
- Dulduli
- Ghoomr
- Humo
- Jaiphula
- Jamera Ghoda Nacha
- Kalanga Danda
- Karma
- Keisabadi
- Laxmi Puran
- Nachnia
- Paguna Nacha
- Parbha
- Rasarkeli
- Samprada
- Sanchar
- Sankirtan

== Bargarh ==
- Dalkhai
- Rasarkeli
- Mawla Jhula
- Jai Phula
- Janhi Phula
- Nachnia
- Bajnia
- Dhap
- Parva
- Karma
- Sanchar
- Sabda Nrutya
- Nuni Bhuasen
- Laxmi Pura
- Kaisa Badi

== Balasore ==
- Chhow Dance
- Jhumar Dance
- Kathi Dance
- Chadheiya-Chadheiyani Dance
- Women Pala
- Laudi Dance

== Bhadrak ==
- Mugal Tamasa
- Baunsa Rani
- Chadheiya Dance
- Kathi Pala
- Sakhi Pala
- Daskathia
- Women pala

== Boudh ==
- Karma Dance
- Danda Nacha
- Dalkhai and subvariants
- Ramaleela

== Cuttack ==
- Chaiti Ghoda
- Ghanta Patua
- Medha Nacha
- Jodi Nagara
- Women Pala
- Dhana Koila (Kalatirtha, Badamba)
- Ram Leela
- Krushna Leela
- Bamboo Dance
- Kandhei Dance
- Kela Keluni Dance
- Laudi Dance
- Paika Dance
- Pala
- Dasa Kathia
- Kendara geeta
- Halia Geeta
- Maipi Kandana Geeta
- Dhuduki Geeta
- Jhamu Nacha
- Jatra
- Raja Doli Geet

== Dhenkanal ==
- Laudi and Ogal Dance
- Gopal Laudi
- Danda Nacha
- Paika Akhada
- Changu Dance
- Gumura
- Bandi Nacha
- Odissi Kirtan
- Dhuduki Nacha
- Kendera Song
- Kandhei Dance (puppet dance)
- Mahila (women) Pala
- Baunsa Nacha
- Chhou Dance

== Deogarh ==
- Karma Dance
- Danda Nacha
- Parva Dance
- Rasarkeli
- Women Pala
- Laxmi Puran

== Ganjam ==
- Jodi Shankha
- Ranappa
- Chadheiya Dance
- Pasumukha Dance
- Bagha Nacha (tiger body paint)
- Danda Nacha
- Patara Saura
- Dhana Koila
- Sakhi Nacha
- Dhumpa
- Ghudki
- Naba Durga Nacha
- Baunsa Rani Nacha
- Gola Nacha
- Kandhei Nacha (puppet dance)
- Bharat Leela
- Radha Prema Leela
- Prahallada Nataka
- Rama Leela
- Changu Nacha
- Krushna Leela
- Hari Katha
- Bhoot Keli

== Gajapati ==
- Paika Akhada (Paralakhemundi Mandi)
- Lanjia Saura Dance
- Bir Badya (war time drumming)
- Gola Nata
- Bhoot Keli Dance (Kasinagar)
- Muan Dance (Paralakhemundi)
- Tribal dance of Tetisingi

== Jajpur ==
- Mugal Tamasa
- Kathi Pala
- Sakhi Pala
- Dasakathi
- Women Pala
- Jhipa nacha
- Folk Opera

== Jagatsinghpur ==
- Chaiti Ghoda
- Ghanta Patua
- Medha Nacha
- Jodi Nagara
- Women Pala
- Kumar purnima Gita
- Rama Lila
- Kendera Gita

== Jharsuguda ==
- Dalkhai
- Rasarkeli
- Mayla Joda
- Sanchar
- Samprada
- Jhumar
- Dand Dance
- Women pala
- Bharni
- Sulaha Bharni
- Laxmi Purana

== Kendrapada ==
- Ghanta patua
- Chaiti ghoda
- Women Pala
- kalika Nacha
- Laudi Nacha
- Bull Dance
- Guduki
- Giti Natya

== Kandhamal ==
- Singha Badya
- Danda Nacha
- Dhangeda - Dhangigedi
- Krahenda
- Pitha khia Dance

== Keonjhar ==
- Kandhei (puppet) Dance (Roda puppet)
- Changu Dance
- Juang Dance
- Ho-Ho Dance
- Women Pala
- Daskathia

== Kalahandi ==
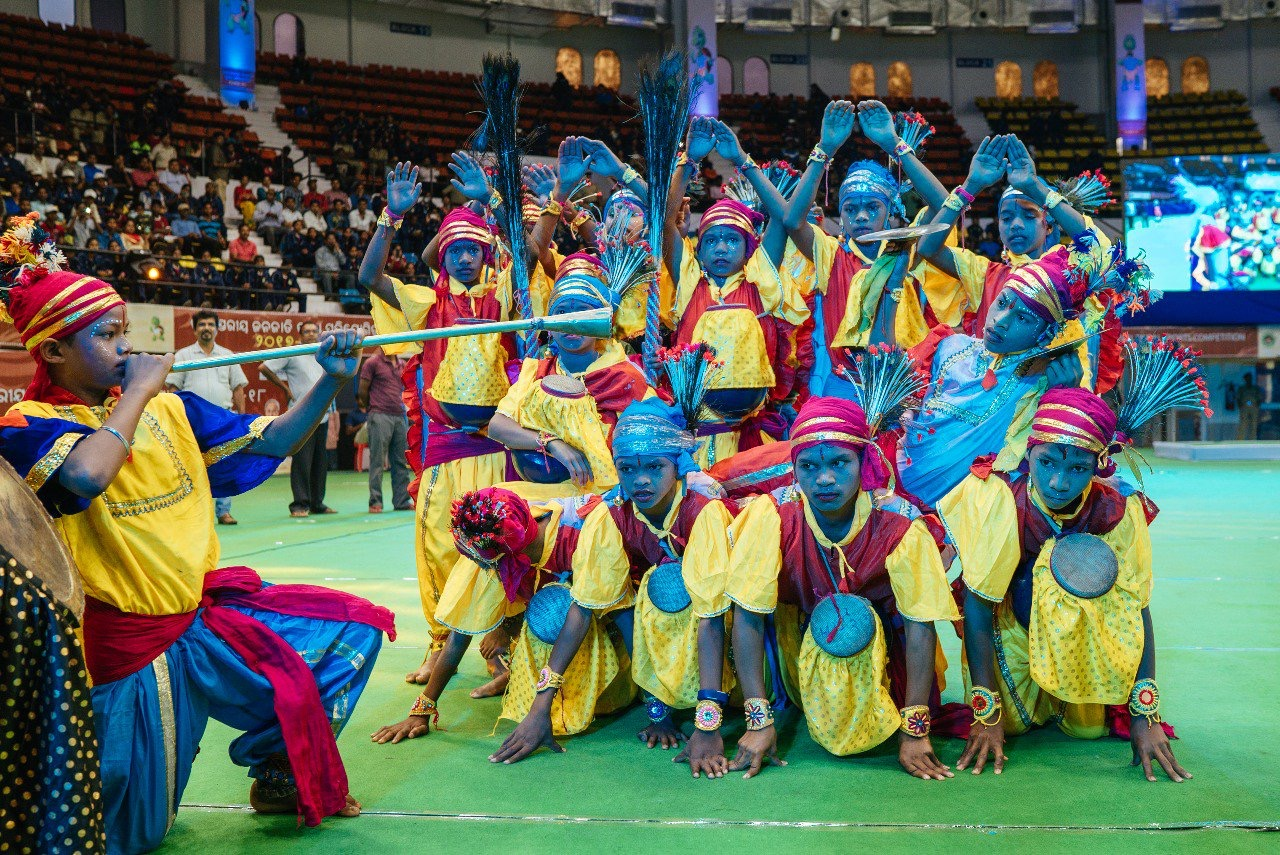
Ghumura Dance during Odisha Tribal sports meet.

- Ghumura Dance
- Dalkhai
- Parva
- Dhaap
- Lariha Dance
- Tukel Ghumra
- Bajasal, Banabadi

== Khurda ==
- Paika Akhada Dance
- Gotipua Dance
- Women Pala
- Chaiti Ghoda Nacha
- Danda Nata
- Gouda Nata
- Kela Keluni Nata
- Puppet (String)
- Guduki
- Rama Lila

== Koraput ==
- Desia nata
- Kandha Dance
- Kathi Dance (Patangi)
- Dhemsa
- Durua Dance
- Changu Dance
- Salapa Nisan (Kasipur)
- Paraja Dance
- Gadaba

== Mayurbhanj ==
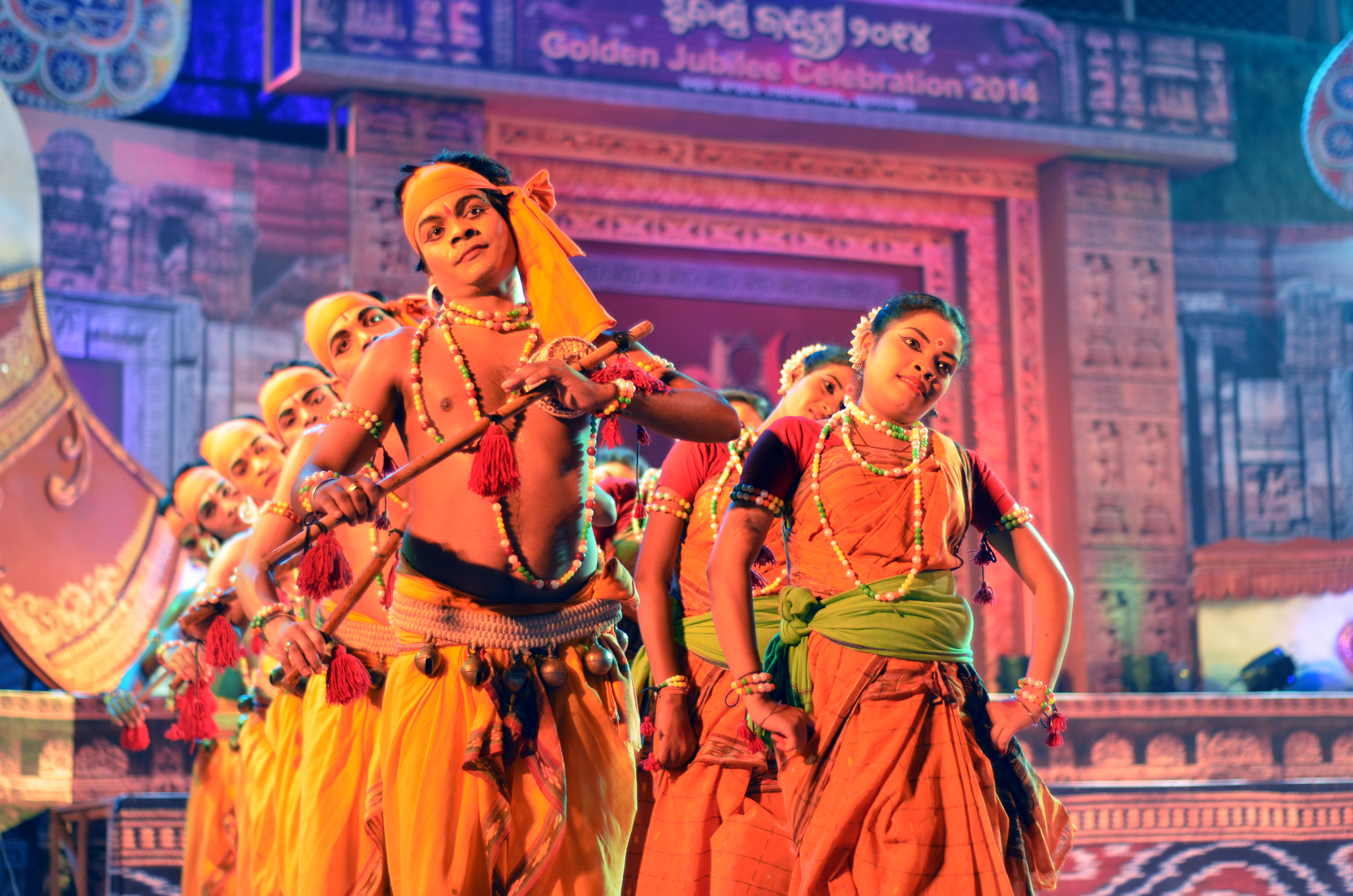
Mayurbhanj Chhau artists performing at Bhubaneswar

- Jhumair
- Chhau dance
- Firkal dance
- Kathi Nacha
- Santali Dance
- Women Pala
- Sakhi Nacha
- Tuila Dance
- Kharia Dance
- Karma

== Malkangiri ==
- Koya Dance
- Changu Dance
- Paraja Dance
- Sakhi Dance

== Nawarangpur ==
- Kui Dance
- Dudra Dance
- Kathi Nacha
- Koya Dance
- Dondahalia Dance

== Nayagarh ==
- Dhumpa Dance
- kalesi Dance
- Dinda Dhangedi Dance
- Matia Dance
- Dubu Duba Dance
- Dala mankudi Dance
- Paika Dance
- Kela Keluni Dance
- Dhudki Nacha
- Sankirtana
- Pala
- Dasakathia
- Rasa
- Rama Leela
- Dauri Dance
- Danda Nacha
- Bir Badya

== Nuapada ==
- Lariha Dance
- Tukel Ghumra
- Devi Dance
- Jura Juri Dance
- Madli Dance
- Laxmi Puran
- Dhaap
- Parva
- Ghoomra

== Puri ==
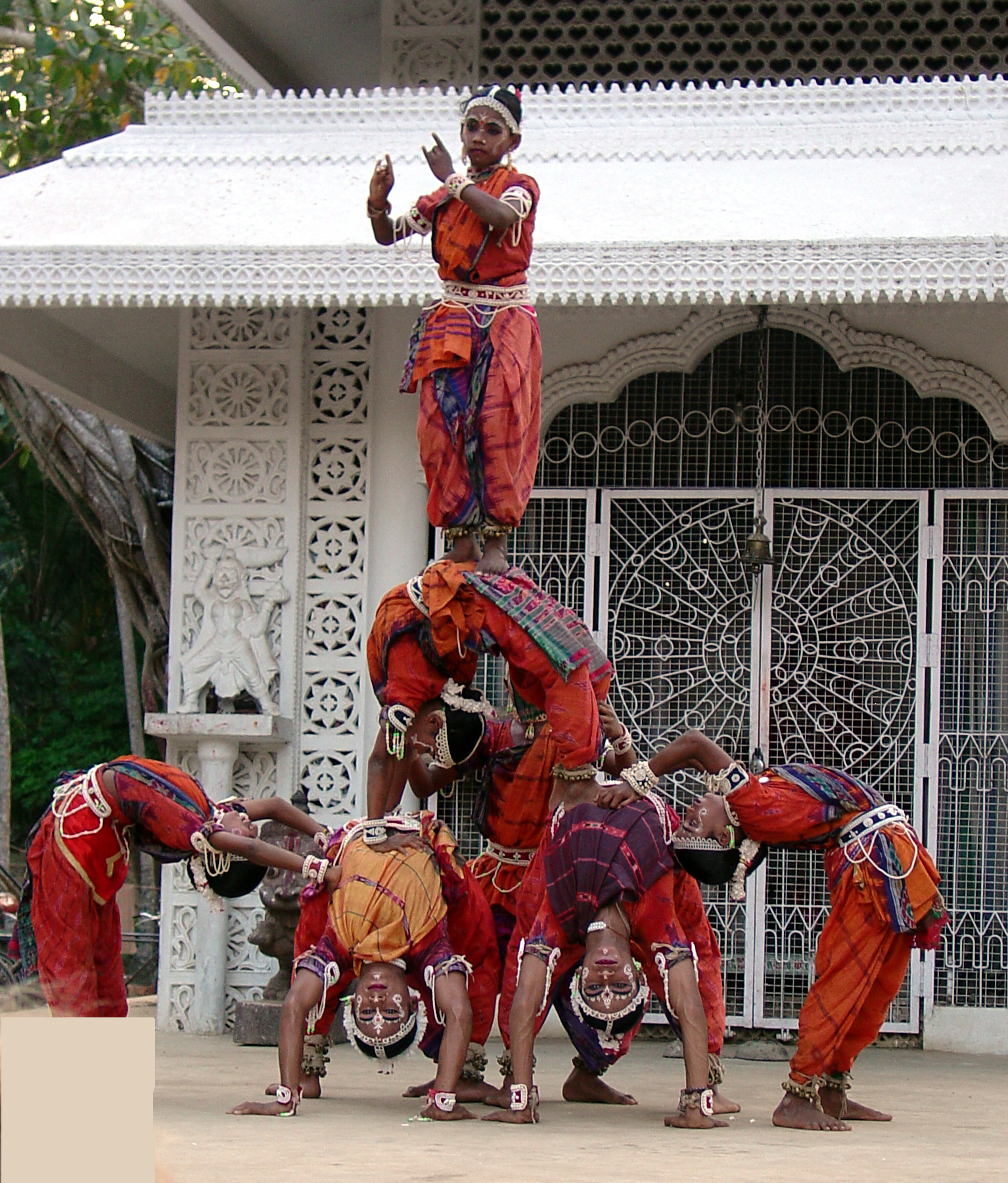
Gotipua dance in Raghurajpur

- Gotipua Dance
- Mahari Dance
- Paika Akhada
- Banati Dance
- Stick Dance
- Medha Dance
- Mask Dance
- Pattachitra Painting (visual art)
- Stone Carving (sculpture)
- Applique art
- Radha Premalila (Nimapada)
- Mahari Dance
- Naga Dance

== Rayagada ==
- Lanjia Saura Dance
- Paraja Saura Danc
- Saura painting

== Sambalpur ==
- Dalkhai
- Rasarkeli
- Jaiphula
- Janhiphula
- Dulha Biha
- Mayla Joda
- Bharni
- Ghudka
- Dhaap
- Parva
- Karma
- Khanjani Dance
- Sanchar
- Chutku Chuta
- Kishan Dance
- Huma Bouli
- Chena Guda Dance
- Sua Dance

== Sonepur ==
- Laxmi Puran
- Rasarkeli
- Jaiphula
- Janhiphula
- Rasarkeli
- Mayla Joda
- Bharni
- Ghudka
- Dhaap
- Parva
- Karma
- Khanjani Dance
- Painri Dance

== Sundargarh ==
- Jhumair
- Domkach
- Karma Naach
- Laxmi Puran
- Rasarkeli
- Jaiphula
- Janhiphula
- Oram Dance
- Mayla Joda
- Bharni
- Ghudka
- Dhaap
- Parva
- Khanjani Dance
- Women Pala
- Samprada
- Kishan Dance
- Munda Dance
- Paudi Bhuyan

== See also ==
- List of Indian folk dances
