= Jhumair =

Folk dance of East India

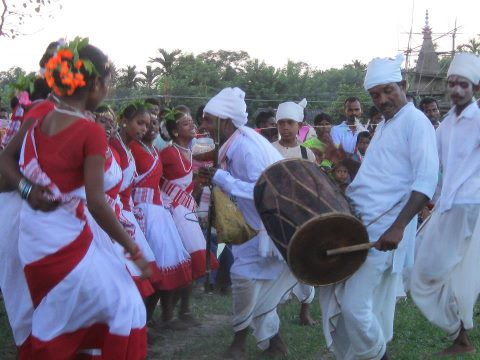
- Jhumair dance by Tea-tribes of Assam
- Genre: Folk dance
- Time signature: Circular group formation
- Tempo: Moderate to lively
- Instrument(s): Dhol, Mandar, Nagara, Flute, Payel
- Origin: Chota Nagpur Plateau
- Related dances: Domkach, Paika, Chhau

Jhumair or Jhumar, is a folk dance from the Indian states of Jharkhand, Odisha, Chhattisgarh, Assam, Bihar and West Bengal. It is a traditional dance of the Sadan, the Indo-Aryan ethnic groups of Chotanagpur. It is also performed by Adivasi communities and is mainly associated with the harvest season.

The musical instruments used in Jhumair include the Mandar, Dhol, Nagara, and Bansuri. The dance involves performers standing in a row, holding hands, singing couplets, swaying their bodies, clapping their hands, and occasionally performing timed jumps.

== Varieties ==
Jhumur Dance at Bokpara tea state in Dibrugarh .

The Jhumair/Jhumar dance varies in style across different regions. In the Chotanagpur region, there are various types of Jhumar, such as:

- Khortha Jhumar
- Kurmali Jhumar
- Panch Pargarnia Jhumar
- Nagpuri Jhumar
  - Mardani Jhumar
  - Janani Jhumar

== Notable exponent ==
- Govind Sharan Lohra, folk artist from Jharkhand
- Mukund Nayak, folk artist from Jharkhand

== See also ==
- Circle dance
