= Janani Jhumar =

Janani Jhumar also Janani Jhumair is a Nagpuri folk dance of the Chota Nagpur Plateau region of Jharkhand. It is a women-centric dance. The music of instruments used, such as mandar, dhol and bansi. The women hold each other's hand, form a linear line and dance in a circle. The dance movements have feminine grace. While women sing and dance, men play musical instruments. This dance is performed in the festival of Karam and Jitiya.

This dance is also called Angnai when it is done in the courtyard. According to occasion and dancing style, Angnai is divided into several types such as Chandhantari, Pahilsanjha, Adhratiya, Bhinsariya, Udhaowa, Thadauwa, Lahasua, Khemta, Daiddhara, Raskrida etc. According to region, it is divided into Purbaha, Pachhimaha, Uttaraha, Dakshinaha, Sonpuriya, Nagpuriya, Jashpuriya, Gangpuriya, Henthghatiya and Assamiya. The dances start in the month of Ashadh (June–July) and continue till Deouthan till Kartik (October–November). Then marriage season start and comes the season of Domkach dance.
