= Kaajee Singh =

Indian percussionist (1945–2025)

- Born: 1945; Kalimpong, Bengal Province, British India
- Died: 21 January 2025 (aged 80); Kalimpong, West Bengal, India
- Occupation: Percussionist
- Children: Nishaant Singh
- Parent: Indrajit Singh Sardar (father)
- Awards: Padma Shri

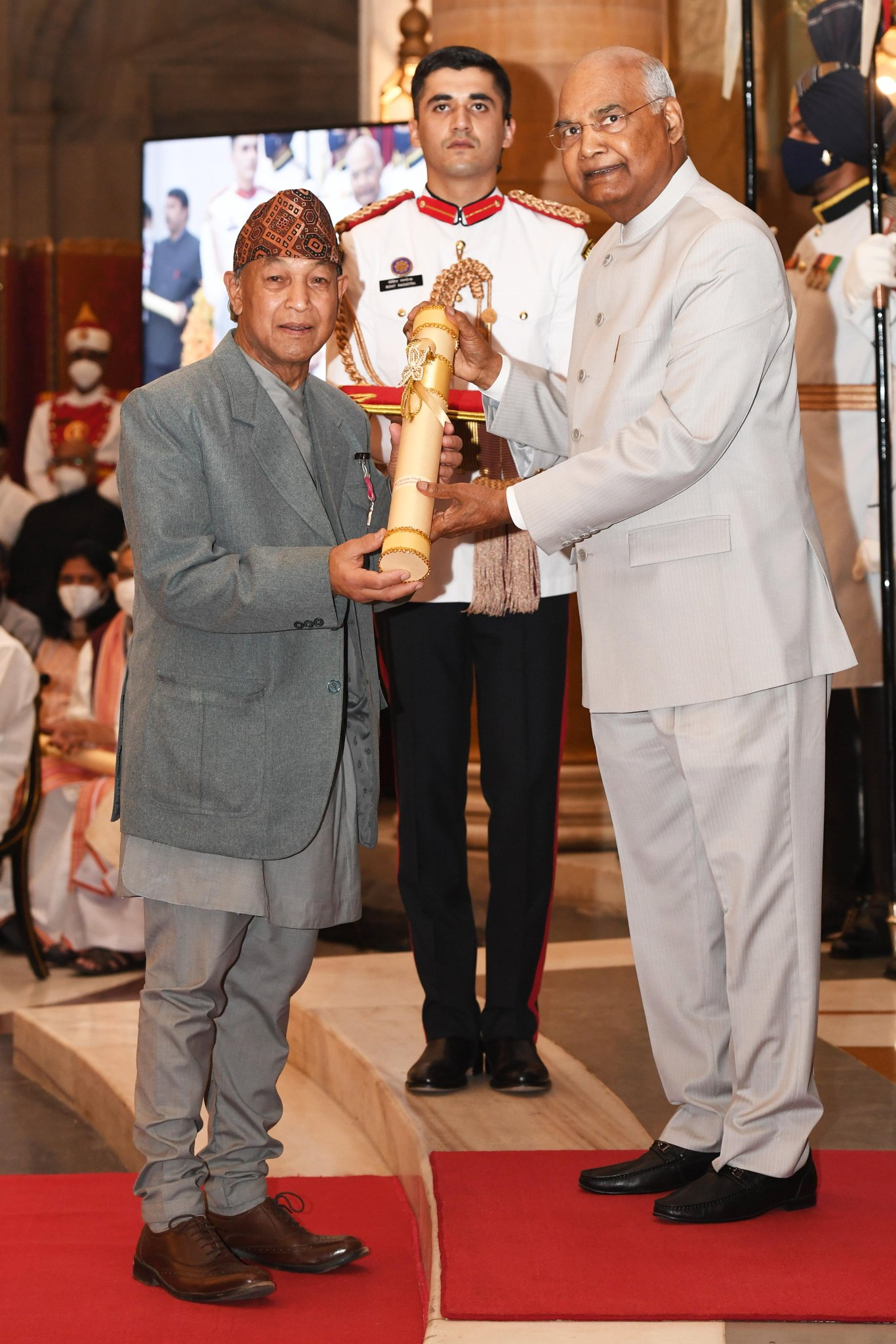

Kaajee Singh (1945 – 21 January 2025) was an Indian Gorkha percussionist. In 2022, he was awarded Padma Shri by the Indian government for his contribution in music in Madal.

== Background ==
Singh was from Kalimpong. Singh, hailing from Darjeeling in north Bengal, has been a part of a family immersed in music for three generations. Growing up in Kalimpong hills, he developed a fascination for folk culture and music from a young age, inspired by his parents. Born in 1945, he has been a lifelong contributor to the field.

Kaajee was the only child of the renowned "Maadalaacharya", the late Indrajeet Singh Sardaar and Mohanphul Singh. His dad, Indrajeet Singh Sardar, was a leader in the Shree Maadal sect of the Gorkha people. Kaajee had the benefit of a prosperous family background, thus receiving great moral support and education while growing up. He attended St. Roberts School, Darjeeling, and completed Metric Pass in 1965, the last batch of its kind. After that, he acquired the Sangeet Prabhakar Degree in vocal music from Mumbai.

Singh died on 21 January 2025, at the age of 80.

== Career ==
Singh began his career in 1952 with the Maaruni dance. He took lessons in Shree Maadal from his father Indrajit Singh Sardar. In 1974, he went to Mumbai and worked with composers like Laxmikant-Pyarelal, Kalyanji-Anandji. He also invented the classical notations for Shree Madal in 1974. In 1983, he came back to Kalimpong. He has written more than five books on instruments and folk music. He also ran the Sanskriti Sangrakshan Sansthan in Kalimpong.

== Awards ==
- Padma Shri
