= Mardani Jhumar =

Nagpuri folk dance

Mardani Jhumar( also Mardana Jhumar) is a Nagpuri folk dance performed by men in the Indian states of Jharkhand, Chhattisgarh and Odisha. It is performed after harvest in fair. Men wear ghongroo, hold sword, shield and dance in a circle by holding each other's hand. Musical instruments used in this dance are mandar, nagara, dhak and Shehnai or bansi. The dance movement reflects masculine energy. Sometimes women dancers accompany them, who are known as Nacni.
