= Jantal Puja =

Annual festival in India

Jantal Puja also known as Jantal Bonga or Jaontar Bonga, is a harvesting festival of the Bhumijs, Bhuiyas, Khonds and Santals. It is a community level festival celebrated in the Mayurbhanj and Keonjhar district of Odisha and East Singhbhum, West Singhbhum and Seraikela Kharsawan district of Jharkhand.

== Celebration ==
It is celebrated when the paddy crop starts growing in September, with the date of celebration fixed in a village council meeting. A puja is performed by the Deuri (tribal priest) in the sacred grove known as Jahera or Jaherthan. During this festival, people sacrifice he-goats and cocks to the village deities and hill gods.

In Seraikela Kharsawan district, Goddess Paudi is worshipped at the Paudi sthan during this festival. The Pakhnapat Jantal Puja, celebrated in the Mayurbhanj district of Odisha, is renowned for its rich cultural significance.
