= Govind Sharan Lohra =

Indian folk singer (1955–2025)

- Born: Govind Sharan Lohra; 5 May 1955; Itta Barahi, Lohardaga district, Bihar, India
- Died: 2 January 2025 (aged 69); Itta Barahi, Lohardaga district, Jharkhand, India
- Occupations: Folk singer, Songwriter
- Years active: 1992–2025
- Known for: Nagpuri folk music
- Awards: Akruti Sammaan (2002); Peter Naurangi Sahitya Sammaan (2010); Jharkhand Bibhuti Award (2012); Jaishankar Prasad Smriti Award (2021)

Govind Sharan Lohra (5 May 1955 – 2 January 2025) was an Indian folk artist. He was a Nagpuri folk singer, songwriter and dancer. He had performed in many national events. He was recipient of several awards including Akruti Samman, Peter Naurangi Sahitya Samman and Jharkhand Bibhuti. He was awarded Jaishankar Prasad Smriti Award in 2021.

== Early life ==
He was born in Itta village in Lohardaga district on 5 May 1955. He is well versed in field of Nagpuri song writing, singing, playing musical instruments and dancing. He belonged to Lohra community.

== Career ==
He performed in several national events such as Rastriya Janjatiya Sammelan (1992) in Andaman and Nicobar Islands, Rastriya Ekta Sibir (1994) in Chittorgarh, Rajasthan, National folk music event (1996) in Patna, Chotanagpur Mohatsav (1999) in Bihar (Now Jharkhand), Bharatiya Kishan Sangh's national event (2000), Hastinapur, Uttar Pradesh and 4th Vanvasi Krida Mahotsav (2000) in Ranchi.

He had helped researchers in regional language Department of Ranchi University about Nagpuri folk music. At old age he had paralysis but he wanted his knowledge to give next generation. He advised youth to not distort folk music in the name of modernization.

== Death ==
He died on 2 January 2025 at his village.

== Awards and recognition ==
He has been awarded several awards including Akruti Samman (2002), Peter Naurangi Sahitya Samman (2010) and Jharkhand Bibhuti (2012). He also received several certificates from Youth Hostel of India, New Delhi (1992), Bihar Government (1996), Sur Tarangi Sammajik evam Sanskritik Sanstha, Patna. He was awarded Jaishankar Prasad Smriti Award in 2021.
