= Jitiya =

Hindu festival

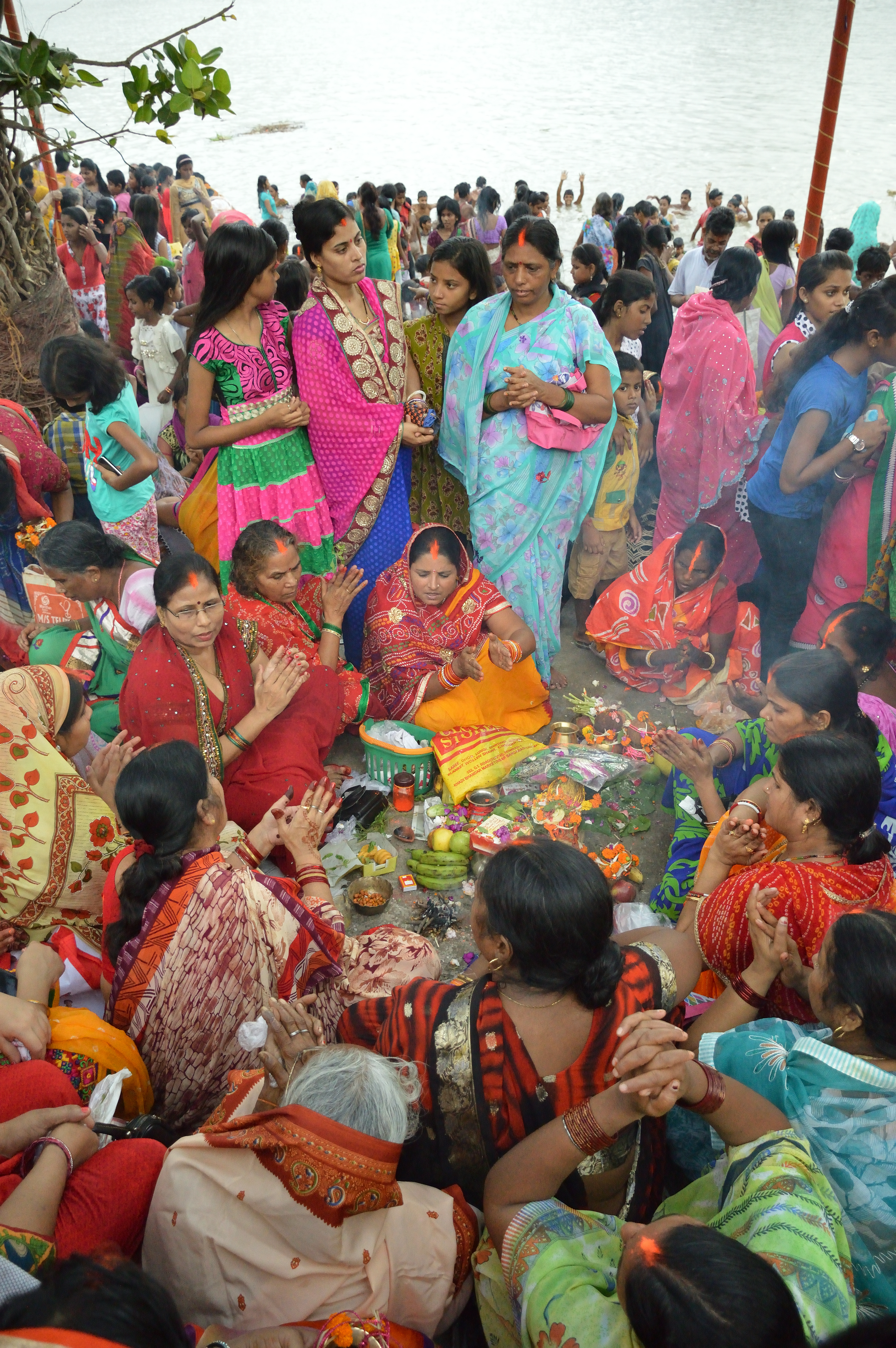
- Jivitputrika observation at riverbank of the Ganges, Kolkata
- Observed by: Hindus
- Type: Religious festival
- Significance: Shows the extreme and never-ending love and affection of a mother towards her children.
- Begins: seventh moon day of 1st half of Ashvin (Uttar Pradesh and Bihar); first moon day of 1st half of Ashvin (Jharkhand)
- Ends: ninth moon day of 1st half of Ashvin
- Date: September
- Duration: 3 days
- Frequency: Annual
- Related to: Jiuntia

Jitiya (also known as Jiutiya or Jivitputrika) is a three-day-long ancient Hindu festival celebrated from the seventh to ninth lunar day of Krishna-Paksha in Ashvin month. It is celebrated in Nepal and the Indian states of Uttar Pradesh, Bihar and Jharkhand. Mothers fast for the well-being of their kids. It is celebrated for eight days in Jharkhand from the first moon day to the eighth moon day in the first half of the Ashvin month.

== Rituals ==
=== Uttar Pradesh and Bihar ===
Jitiya is a three day long festival in this states.

- Nahai-Khai: This is the first day, where mothers only eat after bathing. The food must be vegetarian, prepared with ghee and pink salt.
- Khur-Jitiya or Jiviputrika day: This is the second day, where mothers follow strict fasting. This includes not being allowed to drink water.
- Parana: This is the third day, where mothers break fast. A variety of delicacies are prepared, such as curry rice, noni (portulaca oleracea) saag and marua (Eleusine coracana) roti.
- In Bihar and Uttar Pradesh, a story of a jackal and an eagle is famous. Together with the deity Jiutvahan, people offer prayers in the name of the jackal and the eagle.

=== Jharkhand ===
In Jharkhand, the festival is known as Jitiya and people celebrate for eight days. It start on the first day of Ashwin month. The pani bharwa of the village announces the starting of the Jitiya festival in Purnima. The next day, women collect sand from the river in a bamboo basket, early in the morning, so that nobody sees them, and put out eight types of seeds, such as rice, gram, and corn. They sing songs for eight days and do not eat onion, garlic, or meat. On the seventh day, they put foods for jackals and eagles on the bank of a river after bathing. They fast and eat eight types of vegetables, rice of Arua, and madua roti in the evening. On the eighth day, they fast and plant a branch of Jitiya (Sacred fig) in the courtyard or Akhra. They prepare Pua, Dhooska, and put eight types of vegetables, flowers, and fruits in a basket. They worship the Jitiya branch, listening to the story of Jitvahan from Brahmin and ask Jitiya (Jitvahan) for a long life for their children. They sing songs and Jhumar dance through the night. The next day, they immerse the branches of a sacred fig tree in a river or stream before bathing and putting a flower garland on the neck of their child.

=== Nepal ===
In Himalayan nation Nepal, the festival of Jitiya is observed by the married women of Maithil, Tharu and Bhojpuri communities of Eastern and Central Nepal. Nepalese women observe a Nirjala fast (without water) on this day, and break this fast on the next day, at the end of Ashtami. Sometimes, when Ashtami begins in afternoon, women have to fast for two days. Since during the fast, nothing is put in their mouths, the fast is also called Khar Jiutia. Children who have escaped severe accidents are believed to have the blessings of their mother having performed this brat. It is tradition to eat fish and chapatti (roti, bread) made of millets (Marua) on the previous day. In the night prior to fast, they take a meal before the beginning of Ashtami. This is specific to this fast. Often, children are awoken and fed the preparations. Tharu women perform a traditional dance called Jhamta during the festival.

== Legend ==
According to legends, Jimutvahana was king of Gandharvas. He gave up his kingdom to his brothers and went to forest to serve his father. He married Malayavati. Once, he saw an old woman mourning; she told him that she belongs to the nagavanshi (family of snakes) and that due to an oath, she has to offer her only son, Sankhchuda, to Garuda tomorrow, to feed. Jimutvahana promised to protect her only son. The next day, Sankhchuda laid on a bed of rocks and offered himself to Garuda; Garuda came and attacked Jimutvahana with his claws. Jimutvahana stayed calm, and then Garuda stopped attacking. Garuda inquired about Jimutvahana's identity, to which Jimutvahana narrated his life story. Garuda was impressed by Jimutvahana's kindness and benevolence, so he promised that he will not take any sacrifices from the nagavamsha. To cherish this, legend mothers fast for the wellbeing of their children.

This story is similar to Nagananda (The Joy of the Snakes), a Sanskrit play written by Emperor Harsha in the 7th century CE where Vidyadara king Jimutvahana sacrifices his life for Naga to Garuda. According to the story, Jimutaketu was King of a snow-clad mountain country, Vidyadhara. In his house, there was a heaven-sent wishing tree, the legacy of his forefathers. He had no son, so he asked the tree for a son. Then, a child was born and Jimutaketu named him Jimutvahana; he was full of compassion for all living beings. He spoke to his father and asked the wishing tree to banish poverty and give wealth to men. Consequently, the tree sent gold showers to the land, and men rejoiced. The fame of Jimutvahana extended far and wide - even King Jimutaket, normally filled with hatred, fixated on his son's glory. They wanted to seize the place, where a wishing tree grows, bent on war. Then, Jimutvahana gave up fighting for the Throne with relatives, and left the forest with his parents, for the Malaya mountains. Siddha, the prince, stayed in these mountains. He wished for his sister, Malayavati, to marry Jimutvahana, which they accepted.

In his past life, Jimutvahana was Vidyadhara and Malayavati was his wife. Once, he saw a woman crying. The son of the woman, Sankhchuda, tells him that they are nagas, and the serpent king sent him to the rock of death. Sankhachuda told him that the Garuda, son of Vinata, started to kill nagas after getting nectar from Vishnu, as in the past, Kadru made Vinata a slave. Garuda started eating snakes, so the King of snakes, Vasuki, made a pact with Garuda to send a snake daily. Jimutvahana placed himself on the rock of death. Then, Garuda came, and the earth began to tremble. Garuda bore Jimutvahana away with his beak and started to eat. Then, a rain of flowers started to fall from heaven. Garuda thought about this incident, and consequently, stopped eating Jimutvahana. Garuda tells Jimutvahana that he is not a snake, but Jimutvahana tells him that he is a snake. Then Sankhachuda told him that he was a snake, and Jimutvahana was not. Garuda realised that Jimutvahana was not a snake, but instead, King of Vidyadharas, and filled with guilt. Jimutvahana told Garuda to not eat any more snakes. Then, Garuda brought nectar from heaven to heal Jimutvahana's wounds and bring back the life of snakes whose bones lie in rock. Then Guari came from heaven and sprinkled nectar on Jimutvahana's feet. Garuda sprinkled nectar and the snakes came alive again, now with clothes. Then, all the snakes and the mother, father, and wife of Jimutvahana came and praised him. Jimutvahana then reigned Vidhyadhara.
