= Firkal =

Folk dance of Jharkhand and Odisha

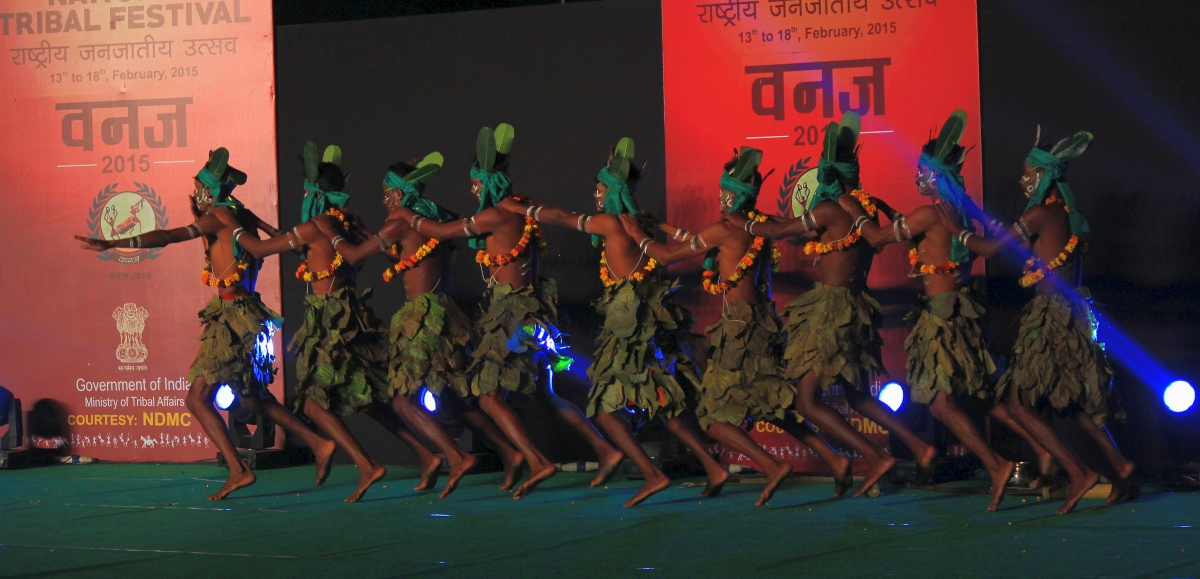
Firkal dance of Chotanagpur performed at Central Park, Delhi

Firkal is a martial art folk-dance of Bhumij tribe. The main instruments of Firkal are swords, arrows, bows and shields. It can be found in Potka block of Jharkhand and some parts of Odisha, India.

Older than Kalaripayattu, and even those martial art forms that trace its origins to China and Japan, Firkal is still very much a living martial art-based dance form, performed mainly by the Bhumij tribes of Chotanagpur area in Jharkhand.

At first sight, Firkal appears to be like any other warrior dance performed by African tribes. The dance recitals were originally enactments of hunting scenes and self-defence, the focus being mainly of raw macho courage. Over time, however, the evolving lifestyle of the Bhumjis has led to the modification of dance movements. Over time, the dance movements have changed into a leisurely, recreational exercise rather than a ritualistic demonstration of courage. These dance steps are variously known as Bagh Taal, Birsa Munda Taal, Pahalbani Taal, etc. denotes the courageous struggle experienced by the Bhumij community. The younger generation, however, seem to be unfamiliar with these dance steps.

Firkal is still alive thanks a great deal to the efforts of Kalamandir—The Celluloid Chapter Art Foundation (TCCAF), a Jamshedpur-based NGO. For many years now, the organisation has been tirelessly working for the revival and promotion of Firkal. Today, Firkal survives in just one obscure village, Janumdih, of Potka block in East Singhbhum district of Jharkhand. A group of about 25 Bhumij tribal families here still hang on to the traditions of the discipline. Experts say Firkal is, in fact, a variation of Kirpan Susun (Kirpan means sword and susun dance), a traditional dance form among the Bhumij tribes of Chhotanagpur. The dance portrayals are mostly enactments of hunting scenes and self-defence.

== See also ==
- Folk dances of Jharkhand
- List of folk dances of Odisha
- Bhumij
- Potka block
