= Paiki dance =

Folk dance of Jharkhand, Odisha and Chhattisgarh

Paiki (also known as Painki and Paika) is a Sadani Nagpuri martial folk dance of the Chotanagpur plateau region of Jharkhand, Chhattisgarh and Odisha. In the dance, people wear dhoti, a turban with peacock feathers in it. They hold sword in their right hand, a shield in their left hand and dance to the tune of musical instruments of Nagara, Dhak, Shehnai and Narsingh. It is done by men and reflect valour. It is performed at weddings and functions. Paik were foot soldiers during medieval period. It is primarily performed by Rautia, who used to be soldiers during reign of Nagvanshi dynasty in Chotanagpur. It is also performed by some Munda tribe in Khunti and Mayurbhanj district.
