= Nacnī =

Female classical dancers in India

Nacni means female dancer in north Indian languages. In the east-central Indian states of Jharkhand, West Bengal, and Orissa, the term nacnī (lit. "dancer" pronounced NUCH-nee) refers to female performers who sing and dance professionally in rural areas, accompanied by male ḍhulkī and nagarā drummers who move around the stage with her.

Women who perform as nacnīs are considered "kept women" and are usually paired in an informal "marriage" with a male manager and dancing partner, typically of a higher caste. In this pairing, nacnīs are thought to embody the goddess Radha while the male dancing partner is a stand-in for Krishna. The performers are considered out-caste and in many ways transgress usual Indian caste and gender distinctions both on and off stage, taking on a certain power role among their "fans" and often engaging in "typically male" behavior, such as drinking and smoking. This style of performance is rapidly disappearing.
