= Handia (drink) =

Rice-based fermented alcoholic beverage from India

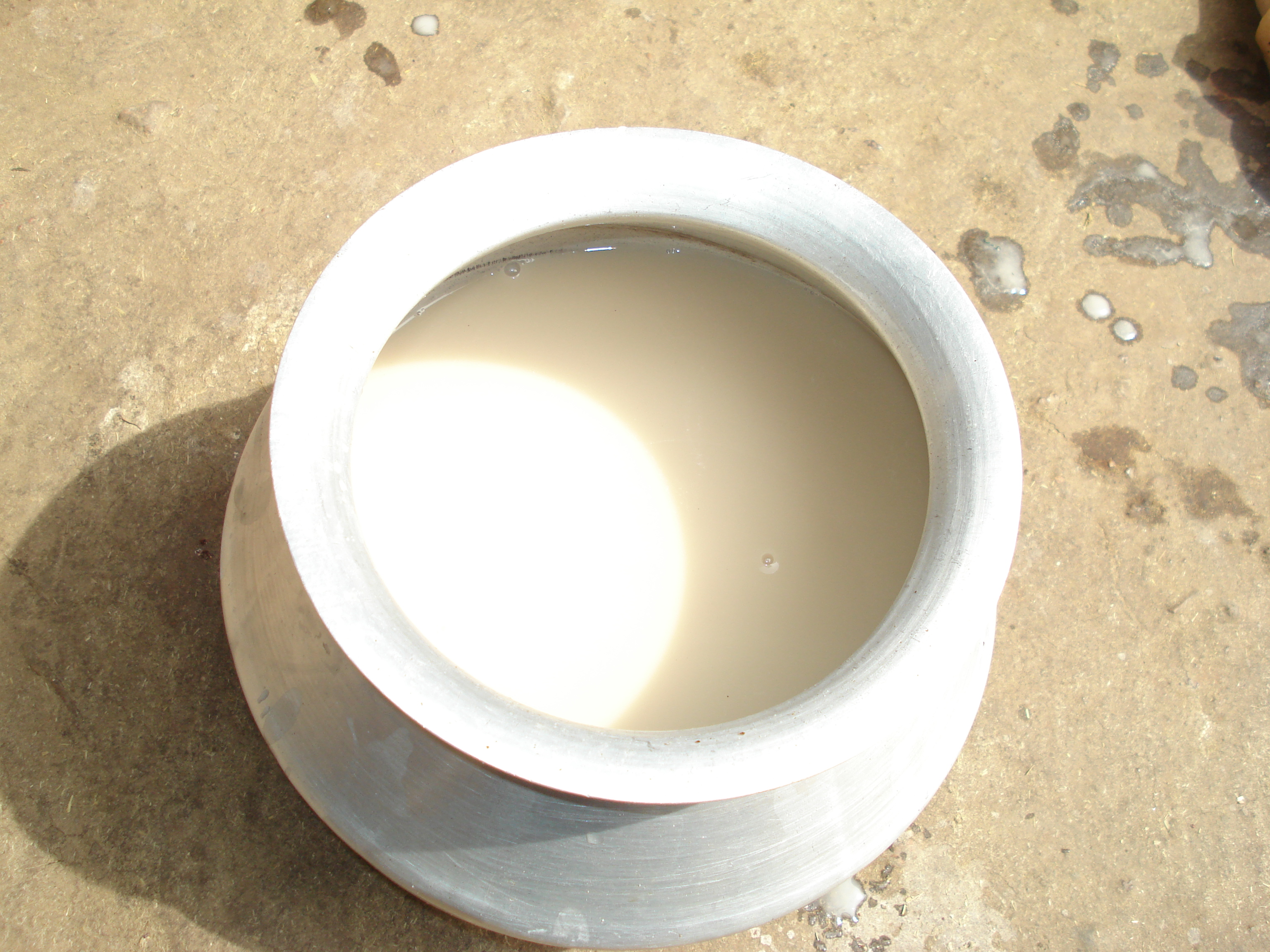
- A bowl of Handia drink
- Type: Rice Beer
- Place of origin: India
- Region or state: mostly in Jharkhand & parts of Bihar, Odisha, West Bengal, Chhattisgarh & Madhya Pradesh
- Serving temperature: Room temperature
- Main ingredients: Water, Ranu tablets, Herbs, Rice

Handia (Also handi or hadiya) is a rice beer originating from the Indian subcontinent, popular in the Indian states of Assam, Jharkhand, Bihar, Odisha, Madhya Pradesh, Chhattisgarh and West Bengal.

== Etymology ==
Handia comes from the Odia "handi" (ହାଣ୍ଡି), meaning earthen pot, the vessel in which it was traditionally prepared.

== History ==
Evidence of fermentation and alcoholic beverages has been found in the Indus Valley Civilization during the Chalcolithic Period from 3000 BC to 2000 BC in India. In Ancient India, the Vedas mention a beer-like drink called sura. In Hinduism, it was regarded among the favourite drinks of the god Indra. Kautilya has mentioned two intoxicating beverages made from rice called Medaka and Prasanna. Megasthenes, the Greek Ambassador to Maurya Emperor Chandragupta Maurya wrote about rice beer in his book Indica where he mentioned that Indians made wine from rice instead of barley. He mentioned that Indians never drank rice wine except during sacrifice.

== Preparation ==
A Bonda man and an Odia man discuss, in Bonda, and drink ceremonial handia in a Malkangiri village

The making involves the use of ranu tablets, which is essentially a combination of about 20-25 herbs and acts as a fermentor. These ranu tablets help in the preparation of many other beverages as well. The ranu tablets are then mixed with boiled rice and left to ferment in earthen pots. The drink is generally ready within a week. It is served cool and has lower alcoholic strength than other Indian country liquors.

Earlier it was only used in marriage functions and feasts, but it has since been commercialised, as people started selling it daily due to economic reasons.

== See also ==
- Amazake
- Chhaang
- List of Indian drinks
- Mahuli
- Nigori
- Rice wine
- Related beverages
