= Ashadhi Puja =

Festival in India

- Observances: Jharkhand
- Date: Ashadha (June)
- Frequency: annual

Ashadhi Puja is a festival of Jharkhand. The festival is observed for good rain and harvest in the month of Ashadha before sowing seedlings. It is celebrated by the Sadan and tribal of Jharkhand.

== Celebration ==
It is celebrated in the early half in the month of Ashadha which falls on June. It is celebrated before sowing seedlings of rice for good rain and harvest. In this festival people sacrifice chicken or goat and offer tapan (liquor) to sun in courtyard. People also offer water in Sacred fig tree and pray for good rain and harvest. Pahan also sacrifices black chicken or goat for good rain and harvest.
