= Nagpuria people =

Nagpuria/Sadān
Total population
- c. 4 – c. 5 million

Regions with significant populations
- Jharkhand, Bihar, Chhattisgarh, Odisha

Languages
- Nagpuri, Hindi, Odia

Religion
- Predominantly: Hinduism; Folk religion; Minorities: Christianity; Islam; Buddhism

Related ethnic groups
- Indo-Aryan peoples

Nagpuria or Sadān are an Indo-Aryan-speaking ethno-linguistic group who speak Sadani or Nagpuri language and reside in the Chota Nagpur Plateau region of Indian state Jharkhand, Bihar, Chhattisgarh, Odisha.

== Etymology ==
"Sadan" (sadān), refers to the non-tribal, Indo-Aryan speaking ethnic groups of Jharkhand. Probably the term "Sadan" derive from nisaada, referring to an ethnic group of Northeast India.

== Communities ==
Various communities speak the Nagpuri language, including the Rautia, and Chero.

== History ==
=== Prehistoric era ===
Stone tools, Microliths have discovered from the Chota Nagpur Plateau region which are from Mesolithic and Neolithic period. In Bhimbetka rock shelters, Mesolithic Painting of group dance is similar to the Nagpuri folk dance and musical instrument is similar to Mander/Madal. There are ancient cave paintings in Isko, Hazaribagh district which are from Meso-chalcolithic period (9,000-5,000 BC). There is a group of megaliths found close to Barkagaon that is about 25 km from Hazaribagh at Punkri Barwadih, which has been proven to date back to beyond 3000 BCE. During the Neolithic period, agriculture started in South Asia. Several Neolithic settlements found in sites such as Jhusi, Lahuradewa, Bhirrana, Mehergarh and Chirand.

=== Iron age(c. 1800 – c. 200 BCE) ===
Several Iron slags, microlith, Potsherds have discovered from Singhbhum district which are from 1400 BCE according to Carbon dating.

In mauryan period, this region ruled by a number of states, which were collectively known as the Atavika (forest) states. These states accepted the suzerainty of the Maurya empire during Ashoka's reign (c. 232 BCE).

=== British rule ===
The Chero and Kharwar rebelled against the British in 1882 but the attack repulsed. Birsa Munda revolt, broke out in 1895–1900.

=== Post-independence ===
After Indian independence in 1947, the rulers of the states all chose to accede to the Dominion of India. Changbhakar, Jashpur, Koriya, Surguja and Udaipur later became part of Madhya Pradesh state, but Gangpur and Bonai part of Orissa state, and Kharsawan and Saraikela part of Bihar state.

In November 2000, the new states of Chhattisgarh and Jharkhand separated from Madhya Pradesh and Bihar, respectively.

== Culture ==
The Nagpuri people have their own styles of dance.

== Notable people ==
- The King Medini Ray (1662–1674)
- Mukund Nayak, Folk Artist
