= Ghungroo =

Musical anklet tied to the feet of classical Indian dancers

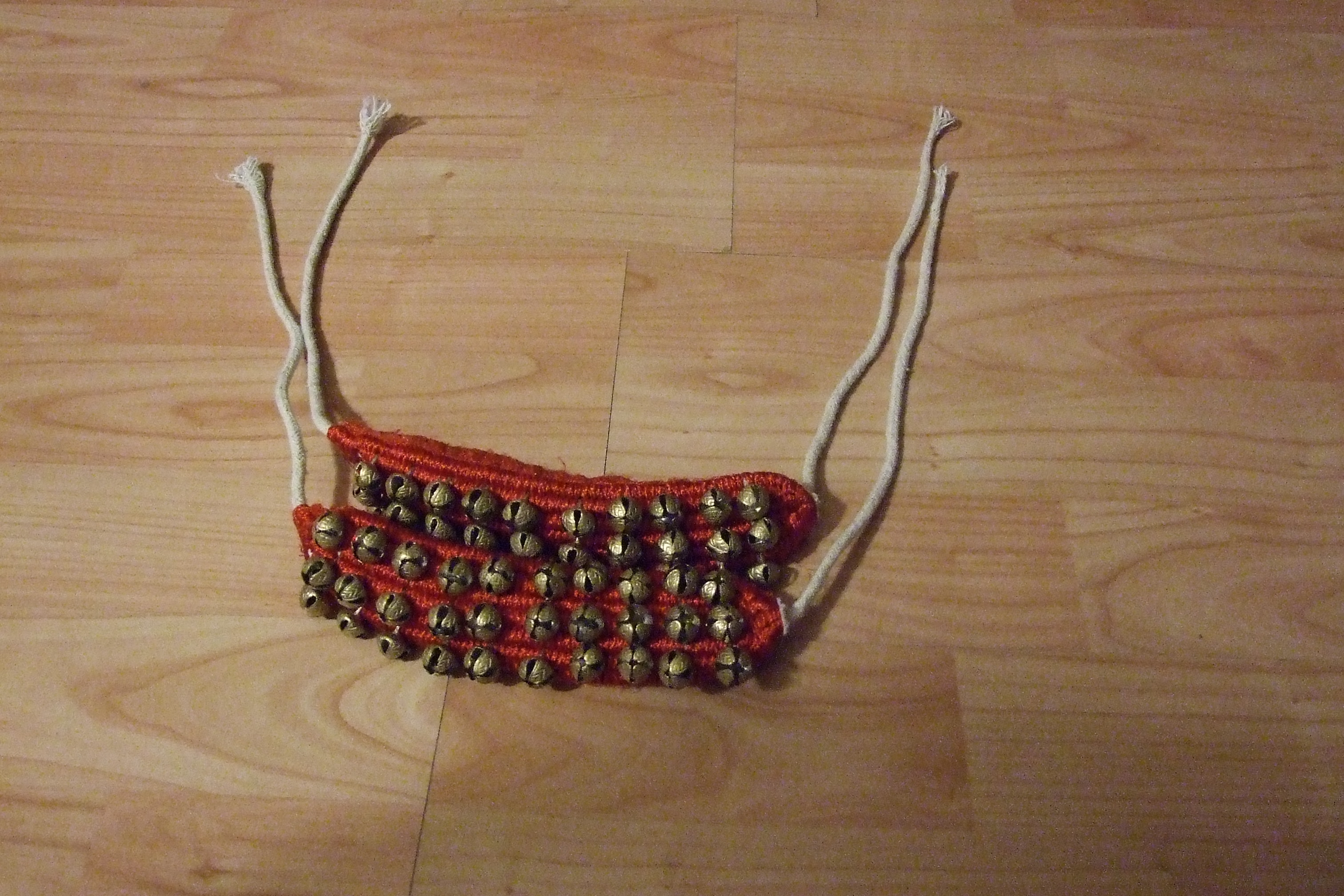
A pair of ghungroos

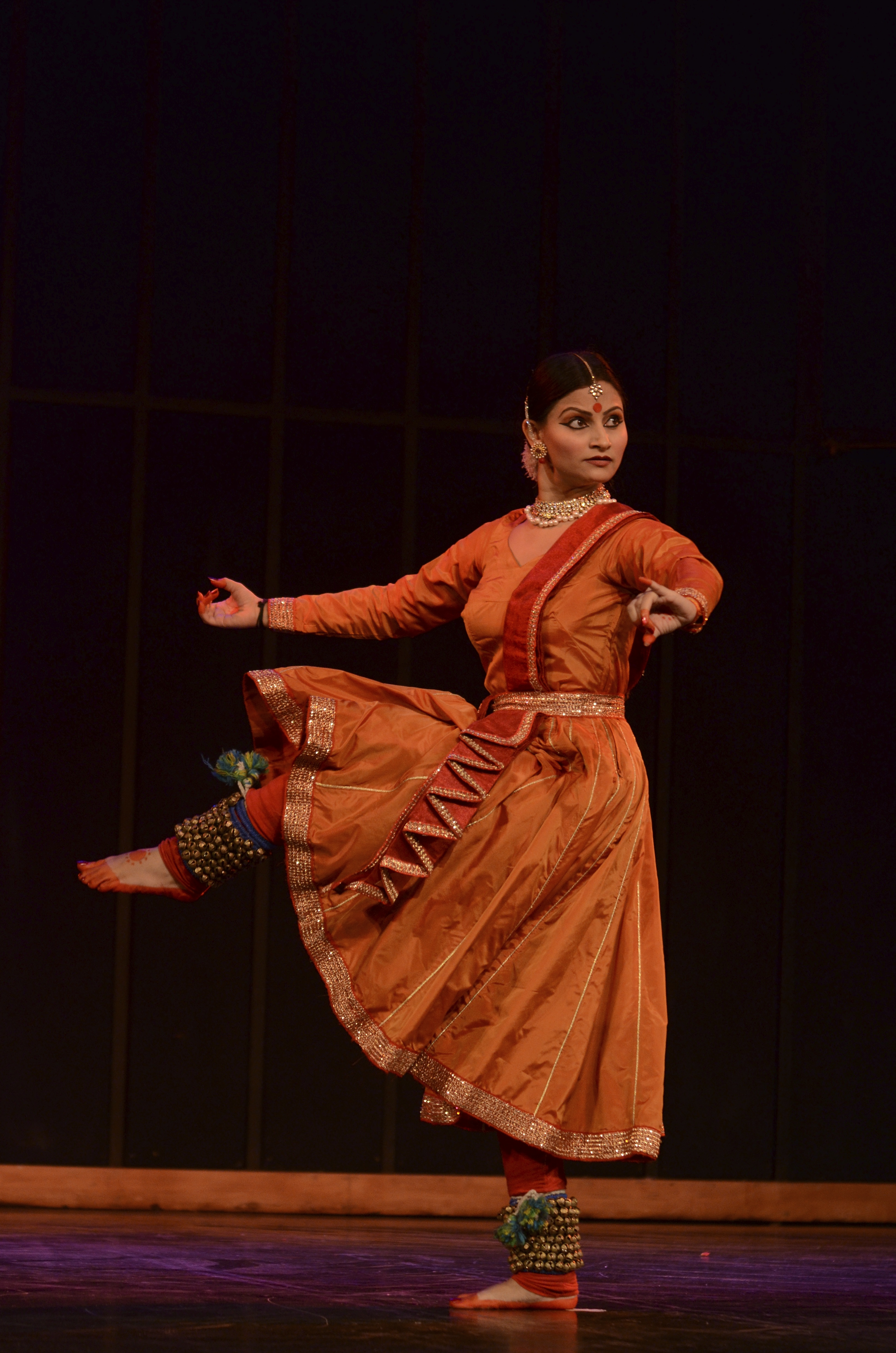
Kathak dancer Namrata Rai performing with 400 ghungroos

A ghungroo, also known as gungjakal, ghunghru, ghungur or ghungura in Northern India, and chilanka, salangai, sadangai or gejje in the South, is one of many small metallic bells strung together to form ghungroos, a musical anklet tied to the feet of classical Indian dancers.

== Name ==
The bell anklet is designated in nearly each Indian language by a term slightly different from the other:

Hindi: घुँघरू ghuṅghrū

Urdu: گھنگرو ghuṅgrū

Punjabi: ਘੁੰਗਰੂ ghuṅgrū

Bengali: ঘুঙুর ghuṅur

Odia: ଘୁଙ୍ଗୁର ghuṅgura

Assamese: ঘুগুৰা ghugurā

Malayalam: ചിലങ്ക cilaṅka [t͡ʃilɐŋɡɐ]

Tamil: சலங்கை calaṅkai [sɐlɐŋgɐj] or Tamil: சதங்கை cataṅkai [sɐdɐŋgɐj]

== Use ==
The pitch of sounds produced by ghungroos varies significantly depending on their metallic composition and size. Ghungroos serve to accentuate the rhythmic aspects of the dance and allow complex footwork to be heard by the audience. They are worn immediately above the ankle, resting on the lateral malleolus and medial malleolus. A string of ghungroos can range from 50 to greater than 200 bells knotted together. Novice children dancers may start with 50 and slowly add more as they grow older and advance in their technical ability. Ghungroos are worn in traditional performances of classical Indian dance forms such as Bharatnatyam, Kathak, Kuchipudi, Mohiniyattam, Lavani, and Odissi.

== Nepal ==
The anklet or rhythmic instrument (talbaja) is also used by folk-dancers in Nepal, where it is called the chap (चाँप). Its Nepalese form consists of 9 to 27 small "curling" bronze bells, sewn onto a cloth about 23 cm long x 7.5 cm wide, tied around the ankle, as ornaments. The Nepalese may choose different chaps, according to the lyrics of the song, choosing ones with smaller or larger arrangements of bells. The bells are called Ghunguru (घुँघुरा).

== Ghunghroo vadan ==
Ghunghroo vadan is a music style evolved by V. Anuradha Singh, an Indian classical kathak exponent. She developed bells as a main musical instrument and performs in many pure music festivals where dance is not allowed. Ghunghroo vadan focuses solely on foot movement as percussive art (100 minutes, non-stop in one place).

== See also ==
- Konguro'o
- Jingle bell
