= Dhak (instrument) =

Musical instrument from the Indian subcontinent

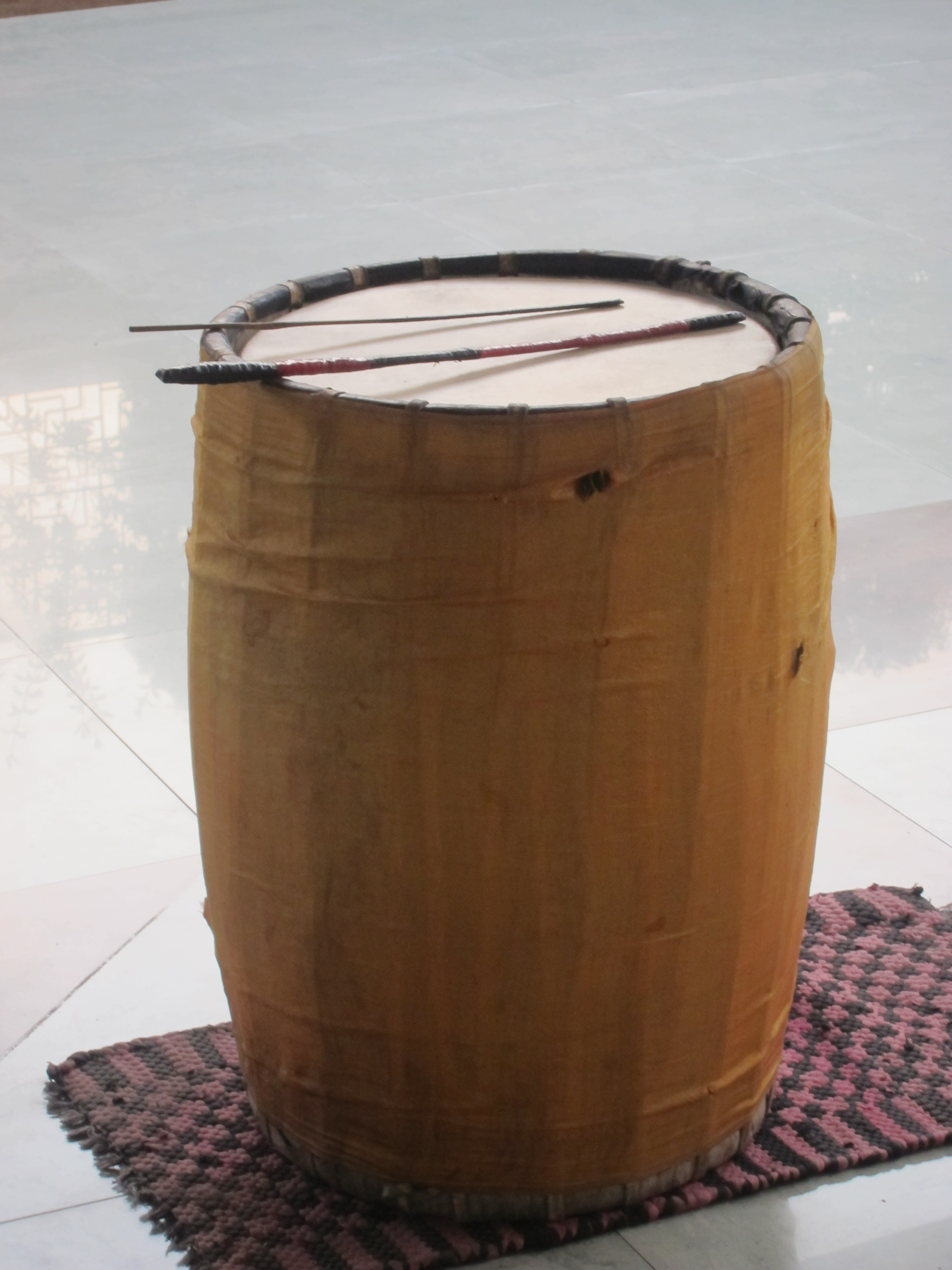
Dhak at Dhakeshwari Temple

Durga Puja Dhak Sample Sound
A 1:38 minute sample of Dhak playing during Durga Puja.

The dhak is a huge membranophone instrument from Bengal and Assam. The shapes differ from the almost cylindrical to the barrel. The manner of stretching the hide over the mouths and lacing also varies. It suspended from the neck, tied to the waist and kept on the lap or the ground, and usually played with wooden sticks. The left side is coated to give it a heavier sound.

It is of medieval origin, and is used in Hindu religious festivals of the region, especially of Sakta and Shaiva traditions, including Durga Puja, Kali Puja and Charak Puja.

The drum beats, mostly played by the Bengali Hindu community, along with the arati (invocation dance) forms an integral part of Durga Puja unique to Bengal. The Bengali devotional dance Dhunuchi Nritya is performed with the rhythmic beats of Dhak during Durga Puja and Kali Puja in Bengal. The tea-tribes of Assam play dhak along with nagara.

The Statesman wrote, "Durga Puja does not assume the festive aura without the maddening beats of the dhak, the large drum that people hang around their necks and play with two thin sticks to infuse the frenzied rhythm into listeners. Those enchanting beats are enough to conjure up the sights and smells of Durga Puja."

It is also played in Islamic festivals like Muharram in Bengal.

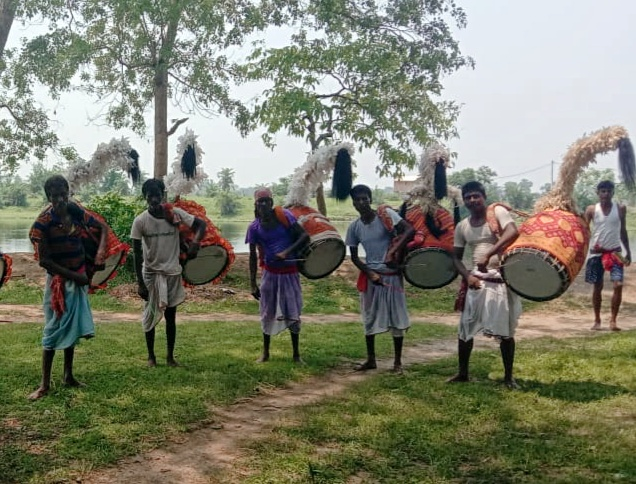
Bengali drummers during Manasa Puja in Birbhum, West Bengal

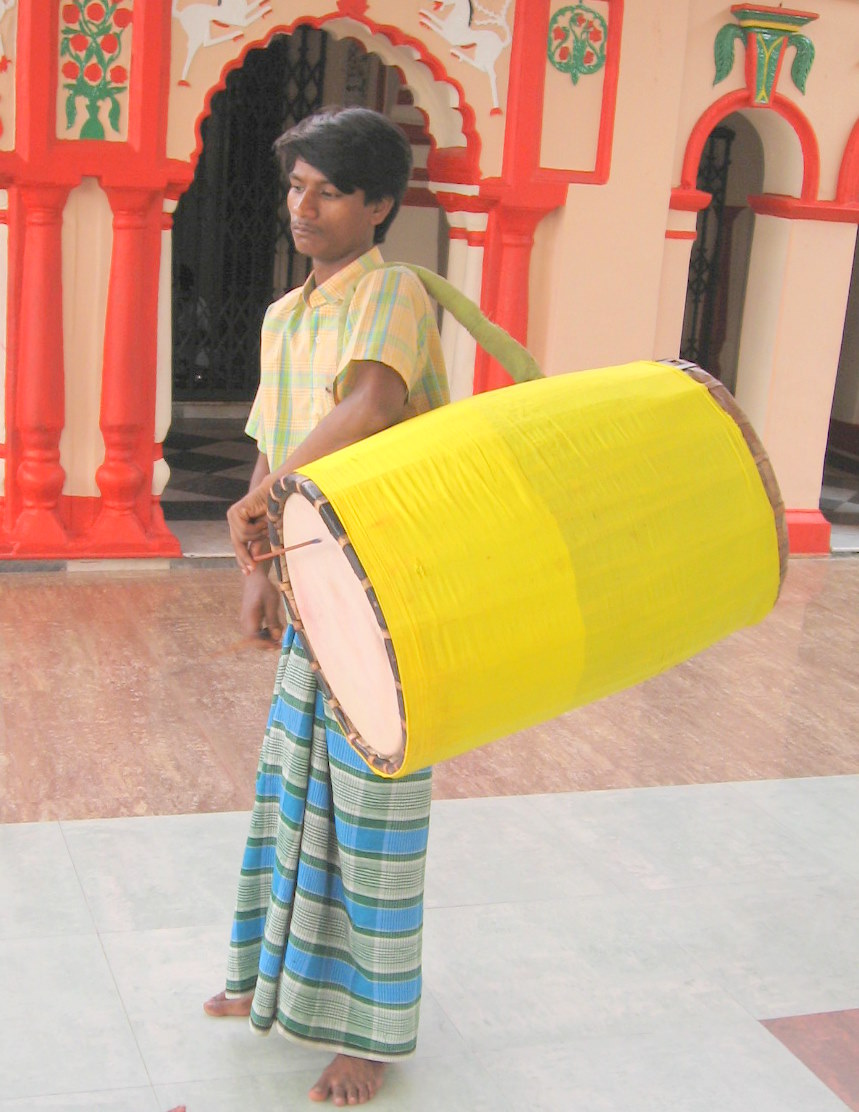
Bengal drummer and a dhaki

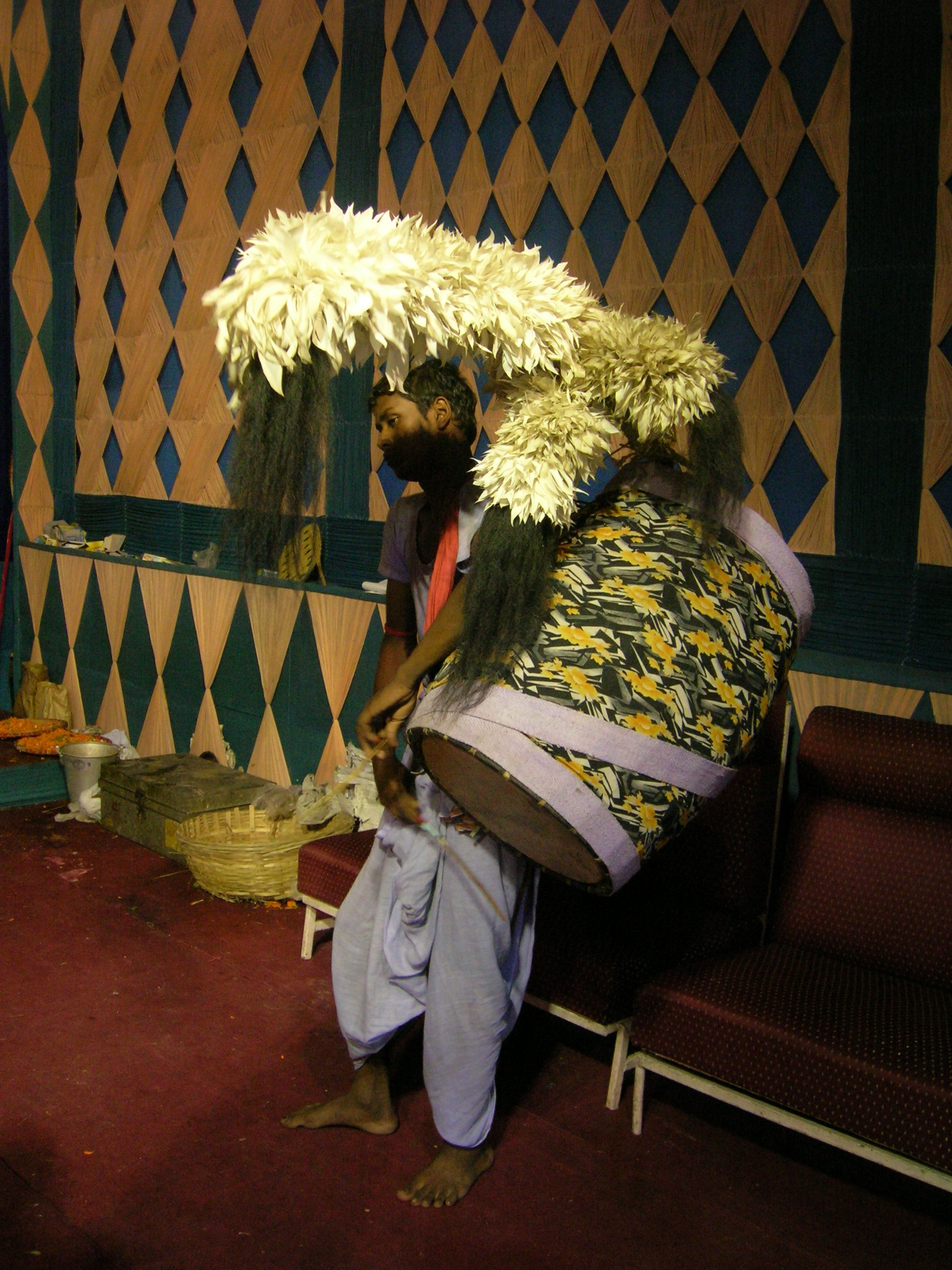
A dhaki with his magnificent dhak at a South Kolkata Durga Puja pandal, 2010.

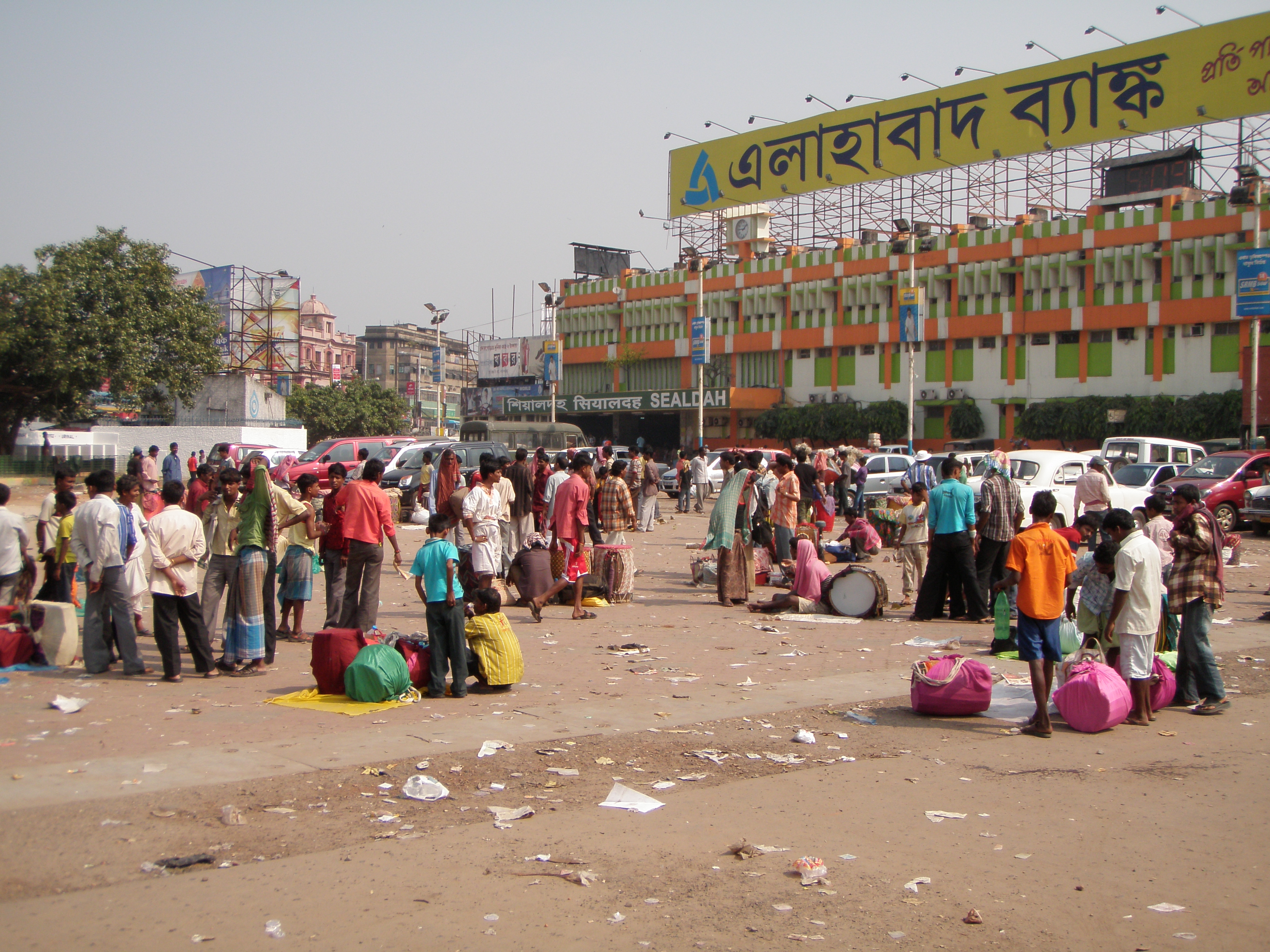
Dhak players, Sealdah, Kolkata

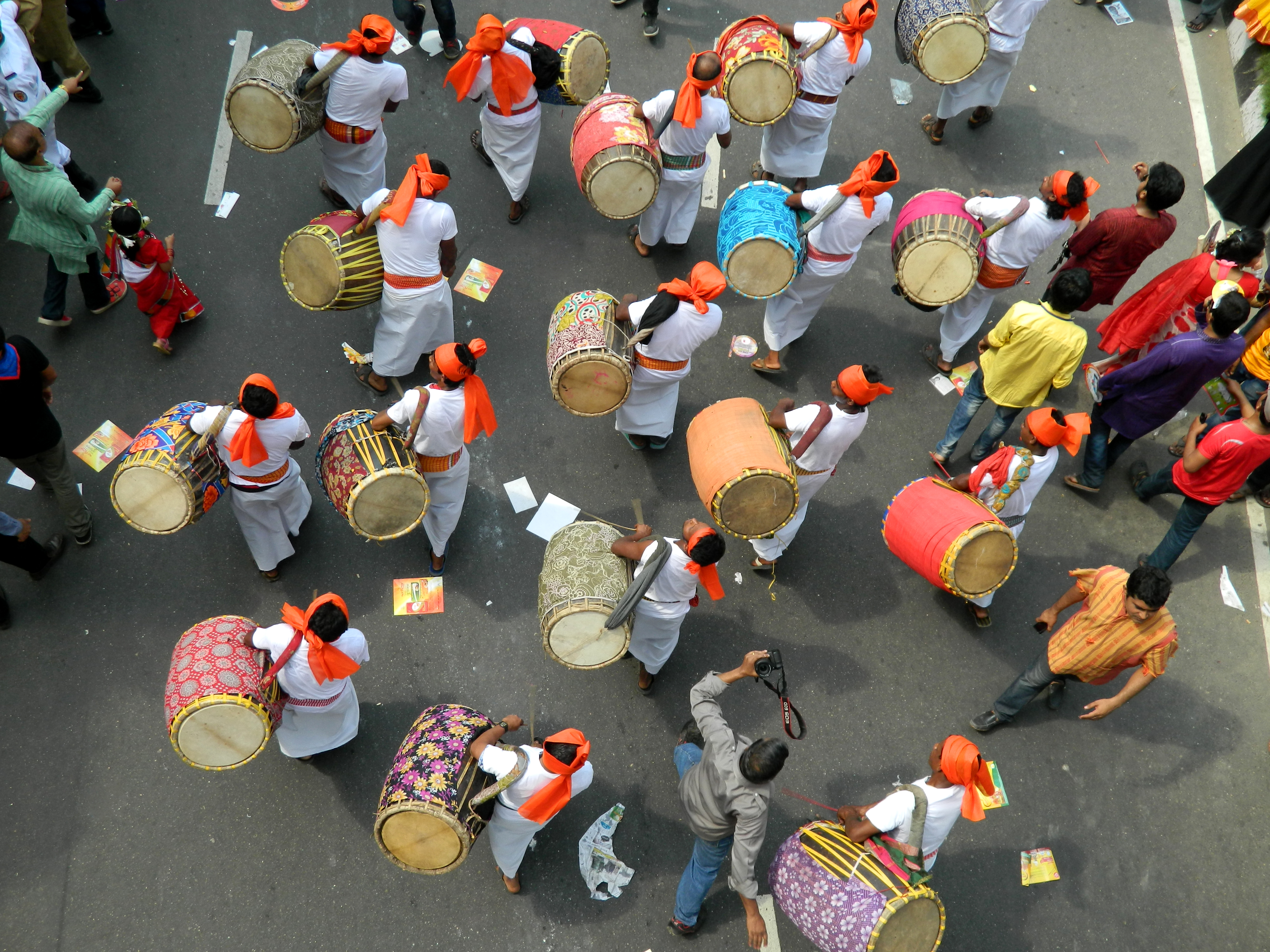
Pohela Boishakh procession from Dhaka University, Dhaka, Bangladesh

== See also ==
- Dholak
