= Domkach =

Indian folk dance

Domkach or Damkach is a folk dance of the Indian states of Bihar, Jharkhand and Madhesh province of Nepal. In Bihar and Nepal, Domkach is performed in Magadh, Mithila and Bhojpur regions. In Uttar Pradesh, it is a kind of festival.

In Jharkhand, it is Nagpuri folk dance. The women and men of groom's and bridegroom's families perform this dance during marriage ceremonies. They form a semi-circle holding the waist of each other. The lyrics of the song are satirical and full of joy. Nagpuri domkach is further divided into Ekharia domkach, Dohri domkach and Jhumta. The dance is named after Dambru, a musical instrument. The dance starts in marriage season after Deouthan in Kartik month (October-November) and continue till Rath Yatra in Ashadh Month (June -July), the start of the rainy season.

It is also performed in Magadh region of Bihar and Jharkhand. It's mainly performed by Dom community of Magadh region.

A wedding-procession (baraat) song accompanying Domkach
