= Madal =

Nepali folk instrument

Madal मादल (Nepali)
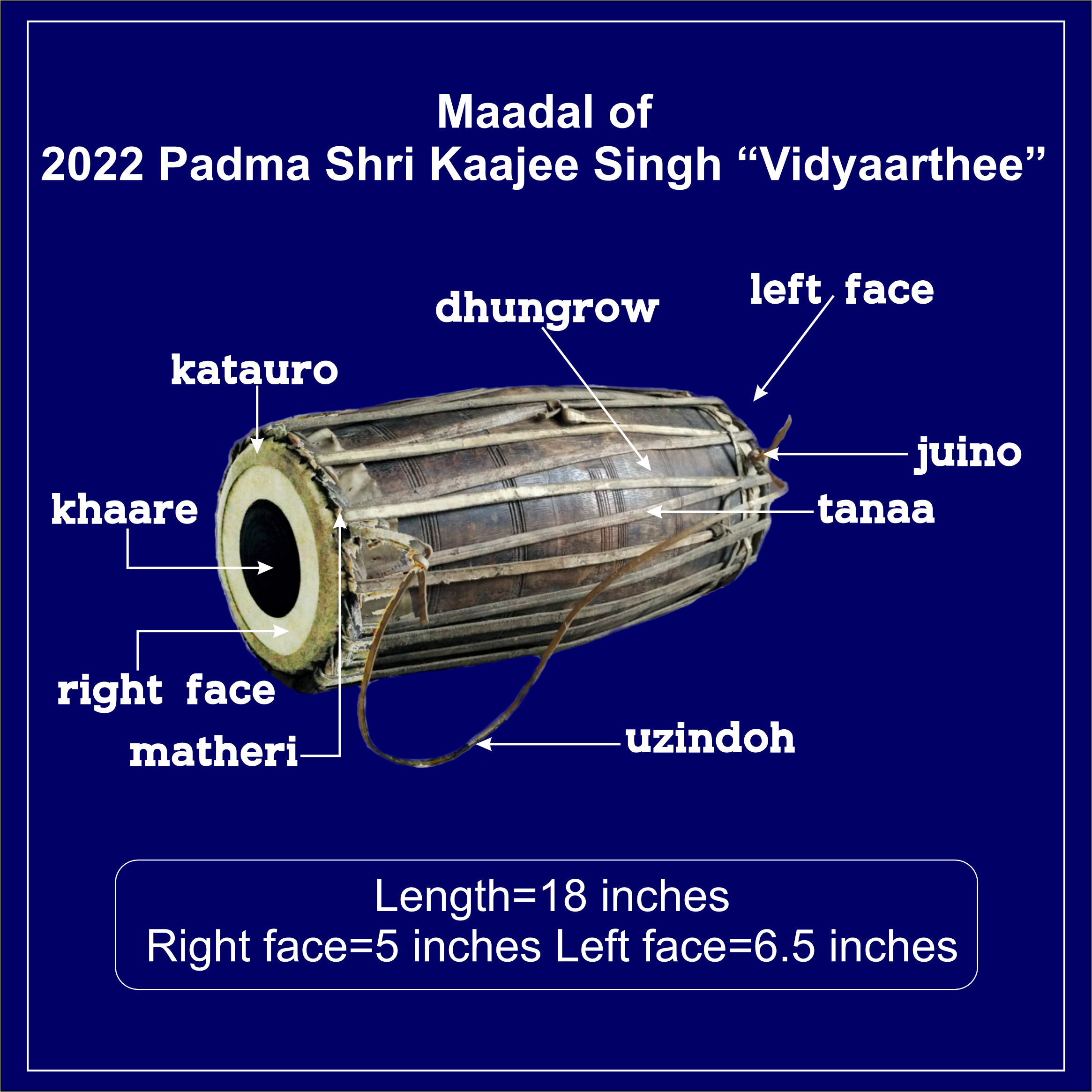
- Nomenclature of Maadal

Percussion instrument
- Other names: Mardala, Maadal, Mardal, Madal, Mirdang, Phakawaj, In Pali it is called Maddala.
- Classification: Membranophone
- Hornbostel–Sachs classification: 211.252.12 (membranophone--individual double-skin conical drum, both heads played)
- Inventor: Lord Biswarkarma or Kami (caste)
- Developed: During Sixth Century

Related instruments
- Mridangam

Musicians
- Padma Shri Kaajee Singh; Dharmaraj Thapa; Ranjit Gazmer; Kutumba (band)

The madal (Nepali: मादल) or maadal is a Nepalese folk musical instrument. The madal is used mainly for rhythm-keeping in Nepalese folk music. It is very popular and widely used as a hand drum in Nepal. The madal has a cylindrical body with a slight bulge at its center and heads at both ends, one head larger than the other. It is usually played horizontally in a seated position, with both heads played simultaneously.

The madal is the national instrument of Nepal and is the backbone of most Nepali folk music. The well-known Nepali musician Ranjit Gazmer introduced this instrument to Bollywood music when he started working with Rahul Dev Burman, and has used it in numerous Bollywood songs such as Hum Dono Do Premi and Kanchi Re Kanchi Re. A madal drum is also used by certain Adivasi groups.

== Construction ==
=== Two distinct drums ===
The Madal/Kham is made up of two unique drums, which are commonly called the "male" and the "female." When these drums are played together, complex melodies and rhythms are produced. Usually larger and with a deeper resonance, the male drum produces higher-pitched sounds than the female drum, which is smaller.

=== Wooden body ===
The bodies of the drums, male and female, are made of wood. Carefully chosen wood is used to create the body, ensuring both sound quality and longevity. Woods that are frequently used include hardwoods like teak and sal. The instrument's overall tone is greatly influenced by the thickness, character, and resonance of the wood.

=== Animal skin heads ===
Traditional Madal/Kham drumheads are made of goat or buffalo hide. The animal hide is draped over the top of the hardwood bodies of each drum. The instrument's sound quality is greatly affected by the selection of the hide. While thinner hides create brighter, sharper sounds, thicker skins produce deeper tones.

=== Tuning system ===
The Madal/Kham drums are quite versatile because of their distinctive shape and design. The tension of the drumheads is changed to tune the drums, usually using a system of leather straps or ropes. Each drum's pitch can be precisely adjusted by tightening or relaxing these straps. To get the right harmonies and tones for a certain piece of music, musicians might tune the Madal/Kham.

=== Shape and design ===
It has a unique design, the female drum is smaller and similarly cylindrical, but the male drum is usually larger and more cylindrical in shape. The drums' bodies may be embellished with elaborate carvings, paintings, or other ornamental features that speak to the instrument's local and cultural influences.

=== Versatility and expressiveness ===
The Madal/Kham drums' distinctive shape and construction provide a broad variety of tones and rhythms. A musician may produce a wide range of sounds, from crisp, piercing treble notes to deep, resonant bass tones. The Madal/Kham's adaptability to a wide range of musical genres and styles, including classical music, traditional Nepali folk music, and more modern fusion arrangements, makes it an expressive instrument.

=== Materials ===
High-quality wood is used by artisans to ensure the longevity and resonance of the Madal/Kham's body. The drumheads are traditionally made of animal skin, which adds to the genuine sound of the instrument. When building a Madal, material selection is essential because it has a big impact on the instrument's tone and playability.

== History ==
=== Early Development and adoption ===
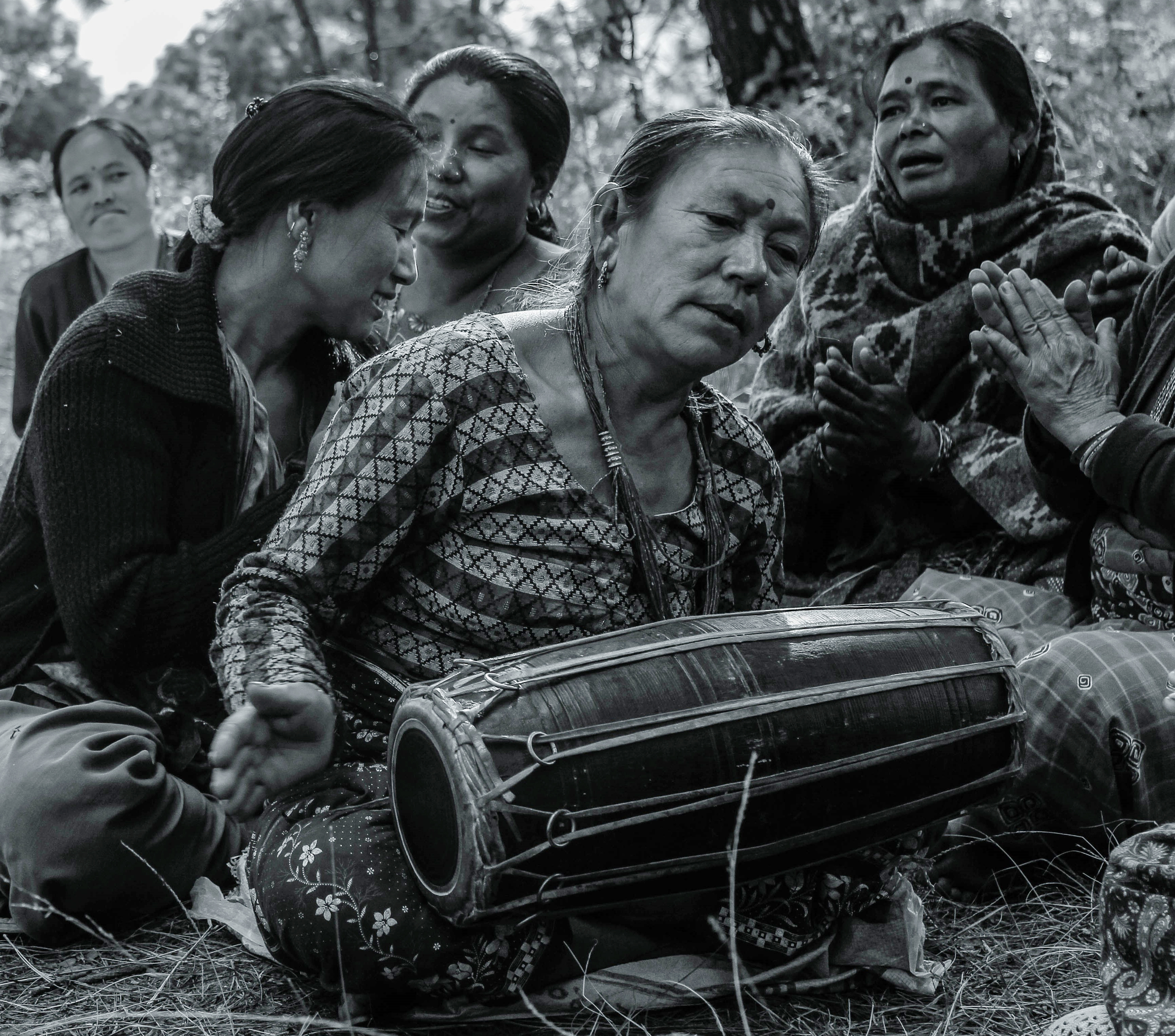
Nepalese woman playing madal in a social gathering

In Nepal, the Madal/Kham has a lengthy history that dates back to antiquity. This percussion instrument has been an essential part of traditional Nepali music and cultural celebrations since its inception. Its ability to evolve and adapt over the ages while retaining its cultural relevance is evidence of its ongoing significance.

The Madal/Kham served as more than just a musical instrument during its formative years; it was a representation of Nepali identity and tradition. The Madal/Kham's rhythmic beats evoked a strong sense of ethnic pride and spiritual connection in a variety of rites, celebrations, and social events. From the calm valleys to the busy marketplaces, it was an essential component of Nepal's auditory landscape.

=== Early twentieth-century growth and development ===
The Madal/Kham remained a mainstay in the Nepali music landscape as the 20th century got underway. The Madal/Kham's form and function remained mostly unaltered, in contrast to certain other traditional instruments that were threatened by modernization and shifting musical preferences. This unwavering devotion to its classic design spoke to the instrument's durability and ageless appeal.

The Madal/Kham solidified its position as a representation of Nepali music culture during this time. The instrument's ongoing application in a variety of musical genres demonstrated its versatility and the easy way in which the old and the new could coexist. The Madal/Kham continued to be a proud steward of Nepal's musical legacy, requiring little innovations or alterations to maintain its authenticity, while other regions of the world witnessed radical changes in musical instruments and styles.

== Usage ==
=== In Nepali music ===
The Madal/Kham is an essential component in Nepali folk, classical, and religious music, among other genres. As a basis for other instruments and vocal performances, it frequently assumes a rhythmic and lyrical function in classical works. The essential role that the Madal/Kham plays in Nepali musical traditions is highlighted by certain compositions and performances.

=== In fusion music ===
Along with working with other instruments and musical genres, the Madal/Kham has found a home in fusion music, going beyond its conventional position. The instrument's flexibility and versatility are demonstrated by this integration, which enables it to connect with new listeners and musical styles.

== Regional variations ==
There are peculiar or regional variations of the Madal/Kham in several parts of Nepal and its neighbouring regions. Different proportions, distinctive building methods, or distinctive ornamental components are a few examples of these variances, which represent the various cultural and musical landscapes in the area. The instrument's rich history and regional significance are further enhanced by these variations.

== Similarities ==
Similar instruments called modal or mondal are found throughout the Central India and Bangladesh. The Bodo also use a very similar albeit larger version of the instrument which they call kham.

== Related Instruments ==
Despite having a strong historical foundation, the Madal or Kham has a number of characteristics with contemporary drums and percussion instruments. These links demonstrate how the Madal or Kham is related to and antecedent of contemporary drums in certain respects.

=== Percussive ===
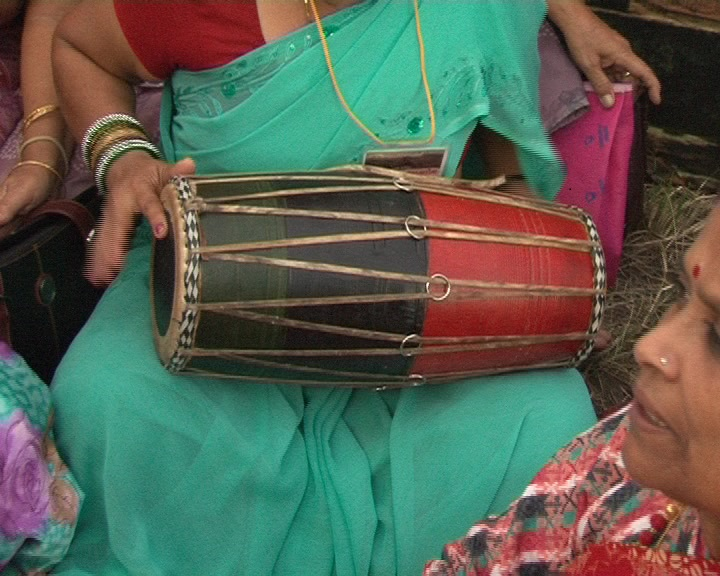
Madal

Modern drums and the Madal/Kham are percussion instruments at their core. They belong to the same family of musical instruments as membranophones since they generate sound by striking or beating their surfaces.

=== Construction Materials ===
The materials used to make both the Madal/Kham and contemporary drums are frequently comparable. Although the Madal/Kham drums had animal skin drum heads and hardwood bodies, contemporary drums also use metal, wood, and synthetic drumheads, demonstrating a shared materiality in their construction.

=== Versatility ===
Modern drums and Madal/Kham drums have many different uses. They are adaptable to many genres and forms of music. The diversity of current drum kits is comparable to the Madal/Kham's capacity to generate a broad range of tones and rhythms.

=== Rhythmic role ===
The essential function of the Madal/Kham in supplying beats and rhythms in traditional Nepali music is similar to the function of contemporary drums in modern music. Drums are the foundation of rhythm in many musical genres, including pop, jazz, rock, and many more.

=== Adaptation to contemporary music ===
The Madal/Kham is still performed in its original form, but it has also been included into Nepalese fusion and modern music. This versatility is similar to how contemporary drums have developed over time to meet the needs of changing musical genres.

=== Cultural significance ===
Modern drums and Madal/Kham drums are important cultural artifacts. A key component of Nepali music culture is the Madal/Kham, and contemporary drumming has strong cultural linkages around the globe. They frequently play a major role in customs and festivities of many cultures.

== See also ==
- Drum
- List of Nepali musical instruments
- Music of Nepal
- Madhalam
- percussion instrument
- Dholak
- Dhamphu Drum

== Notes ==
- Anmol, Amrita Priyamvada (2009). Encyclopaedia of Indian Musical Instruments, vols. 1 to 3 :, xxxvi, 720 p, 3 vols, figs, ISBN 9788126140770
- L.S. Rajagopalan, L.S. in A. Purushothaman and A. Harindranath (eds) (2010). Temple Musical Instruments of Kerala. Sangeet Natak Akademi, xvi, 168 p, ISBN 8124605440
