= Ivor Newton =

English classical pianist

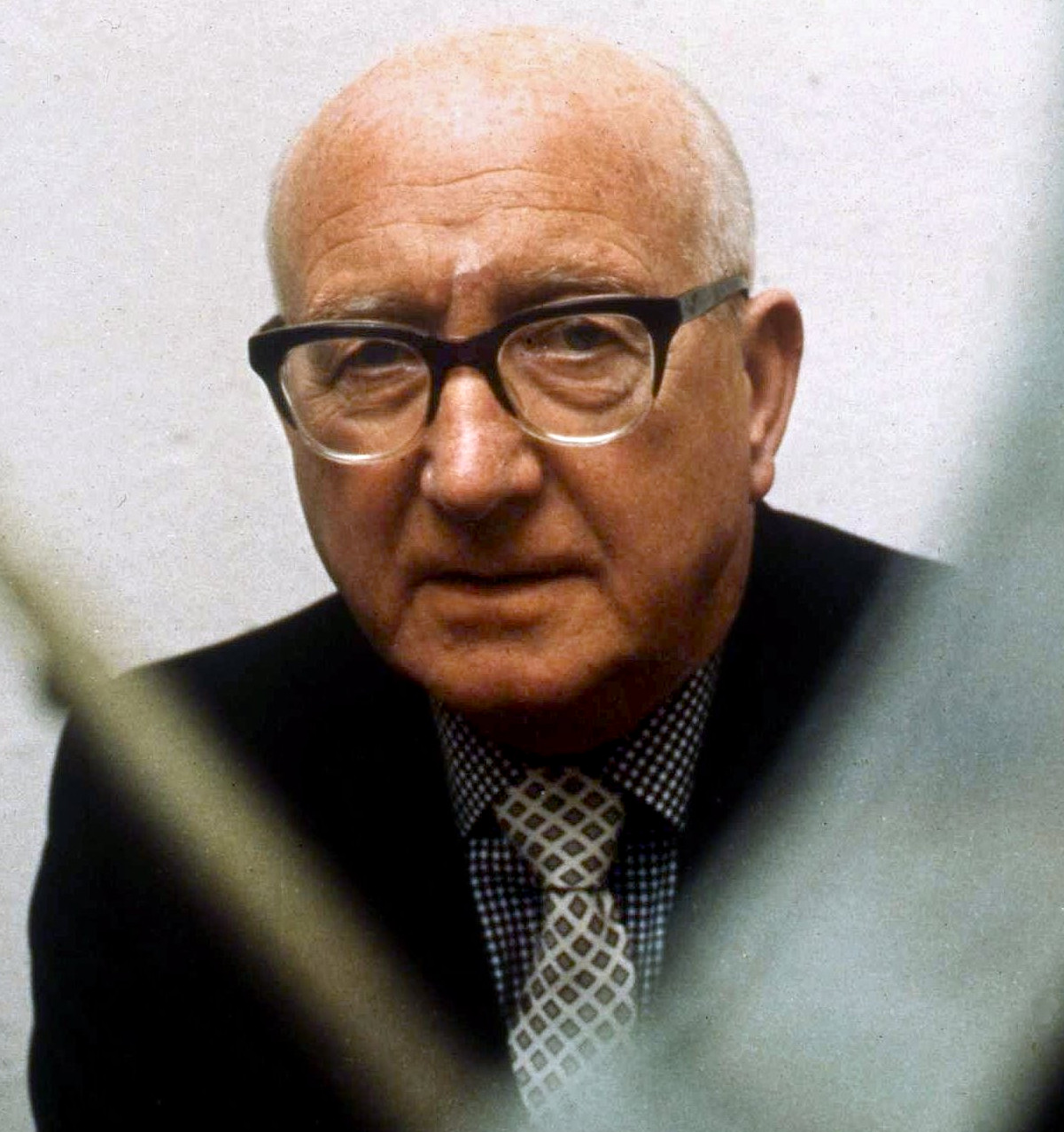
Ivor Newton by Allan Warren

Ivor Newton CBE (15 December 1892 – 21 April 1981) was an English pianist who was particularly noted as an accompanist to international singers and string players. He was one of the first to bring a distinct personality to the accompanist's role. He toured extensively to all continents and appeared at music festivals such as Salzburg and Edinburgh. His career lasted over 60 years.

== Biography ==
Newton was born in Limehouse, London. His studies were with York Bowen, Isidor Snook in Amsterdam, Raimund von zur-Mühlen, Coenraad V. Bos in Berlin, and Victor Beigel in London.

In 1926 he persuaded William Primrose, then a violinist, to study with Eugène Ysaÿe, who, in turn persuaded him to take up the viola, the instrument that made him famous.

In 1940 he organised a concert at the UK Embassy in Washington in aid of British War Relief. He was also a member of concert parties entertaining troops in Egypt, Iraq, Iran and the Persian Gulf.

Kirsten Flagstad was known for never changing her mind once it was made up. However, Ivor Newton managed to persuade her to come out of retirement for a Prom Concert in 1957 honouring the 50th anniversary of the death of her countryman Edvard Grieg.

In 1966 he published an autobiography, At the Piano: the world of an accompanist (London: Hamish Hamilton). He was appointed a Commander of the Order of the British Empire (CBE) in 1973.

Ivor Newton lived for much of his retirement in Old Portsmouth. He died in Bromley in 1981. He bequeathed his estate to create the Ivor Newton House, a retirement home for musicians in Bromley. It was run by the Musicians' Benevolent Fund, which announced in 2008 its intention to close Ivor Newton House in October 2009. Notable occupants had included Vilém Tauský, Stanford Robinson, Roy Henderson, and Richard Arnell.

== Associate artists ==
The artists Ivor Newton appeared with included Isobel Baillie, Jussi Björling, Dino Borgioli, Maria Callas, Pablo Casals, Feodor Chaliapin, Giuseppe Di Stefano, Robert Easton, Emanuel Feuermann, Kirsten Flagstad, Elena Gerhardt, Beniamino Gigli, Frederick Grinke, Ida Haendel, Josef Hassid, Victoria de los Ángeles, John McCormack, Nellie Melba, Yehudi Menuhin, Grace Moore, Maria Müller, Gregor Piatigorsky, Lily Pons, Vladimir Rosing, Tito Schipa, Elisabeth Schumann, Oda Slobodskaya, Conchita Supervía, Dame Clara Butt, Maggie Teyte and Eugène Ysaÿe.
