= Ian Hunter (impresario) =

British impresario (1919–2003)

Sir Ian Bruce Hope Hunter MBE (2 April 1919 – 5 September 2003) was an English impresario of classical music. Known as 'Mr. Festival' to many in the arts world, Hunter was one of the most important figures in a post-World War II cultural renaissance in the United Kingdom. From the mid-1950s, following the death of Harold Holt, he headed the music management agency Harold Holt Ltd, which joined with Lies Askonas Ltd in the late 1990s to form Askonas Holt.

== Biography ==
Born in Hadley Wood, Middlesex, Hunter began his career in 1947, as assistant to artistic director Rudolf Bing at the very first Edinburgh Festival. He succeeded Bing as the festival's director in 1950, remaining in the position through 1955. He served as the director of numerous other festivals, including the Bath Festival from 1948 to 1968, the City of London Festival from 1962 to 1980, the Brighton Festival from 1967 to 1983, and festivals in Windsor and Hong Kong. "Festivals," he once said, "are like sudden fireworks in a dark sky."

"Characteristic of Hunter's capacity for thinking big was the Commonwealth Arts Festival of 1965. In preparing it he visited 23 countries, and it was held simultaneously, over two weeks, in London, Glasgow, Cardiff and Liverpool. Dance was strongly featured: Caribbean, African and Indian groups rubbed friendly shoulders with classical companies from Australia and Canada. Jazz jostled with the classics. Menuhin shared a platform with Ravi Shankar. Balloons were released and fireworks rocketed."

Hunter was also a talent manager, celebrated as chairman of Harold Holt Ltd (now Askonas Holt Ltd) from 1953 to 1988. He died in Balcombe, West Sussex at the age of 84.
