= Alfred Curtis =

Alfred Curtis may refer to:

- Alfred Schulz-Curtius (c. 1853–1918), or Alfred Curtis, German-British classical music impresario
- Alfred Cyril Curtis (1894–1971), British Indian Army officer
- Alfred Allen Paul Curtis (1831–1908) American Roman Catholic prelate
