= Dance in India =

Classical to folk dance arts of India

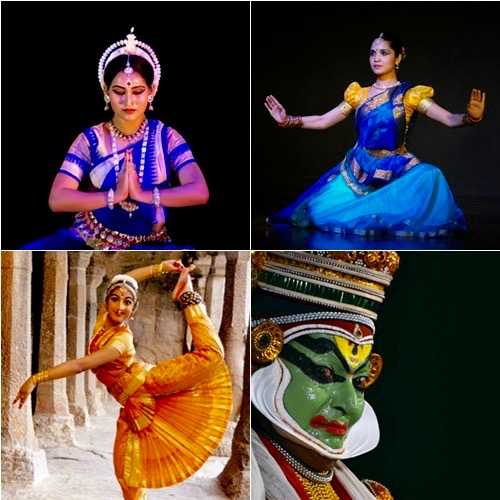
Dance in India include classical (above), semiclassical, folk and tribal.

Dance in India comprises numerous styles of dances, generally classified as classical or folk. As with other aspects of Indian culture, different forms of dances originated in different parts of India, developed according to the local traditions and also imbibed elements from other parts of the country.

Sangeet Natak Academy, the national academy for performing arts in India, recognizes eight traditional dances as Indian classical dances, while other sources and scholars recognize more. These have roots in the Sanskrit text Natya Shastra, and the religious performance arts of Hinduism.

Folk dances are numerous in number and style and vary according to the local tradition of the respective state, ethnic, or geographic region. Contemporary dances include refined and experimental fusions of classical, folk, and Western forms. Dancing traditions of India have influence not only over the dances in the whole of South Asia, but on the dancing forms of Southeast Asia as well. Dances in Indian films, like Bollywood Dance for Hindi films, are often noted for freeform expression of dance and hold a significant presence in the popular culture of the Indian subcontinent.

In India, a command over either of Sanskrit, Tamil, Telugu, Oriya, Meitei (Manipuri), Persian, or Arabic, are highly appreciated and respected for learning dances (most significantly Indian Classical Dances) as dancers could have the tools of these languages to go into the primary material texts.

== Nomenclature ==
The theory, training, means and rationale for expressive practice in classical dance is documented and traceable to ancient classical texts, particularly the Natya Shastra. Classical Indian dances have historically involved a school or guru-shishya parampara (teacher-disciple tradition) and require studies of the classical texts, physical exercises, and extensive training to systematically synchronize the dance repertoire with underlying play or composition, vocalists and the orchestra.

A folk Indian dance is one which is largely an oral tradition, whose traditions have been historically learnt and mostly passed down from one generation to the next through word of mouth and casual joint practice. A semi-classical Indian dance is one that contains a classical imprint but has become a folk dance and lost its texts or schools. A tribal dance is a more local form of folk dance, typically found in one tribal population; typically tribal dances evolve into folk dances over a historic period.

== Origins of dance in India ==
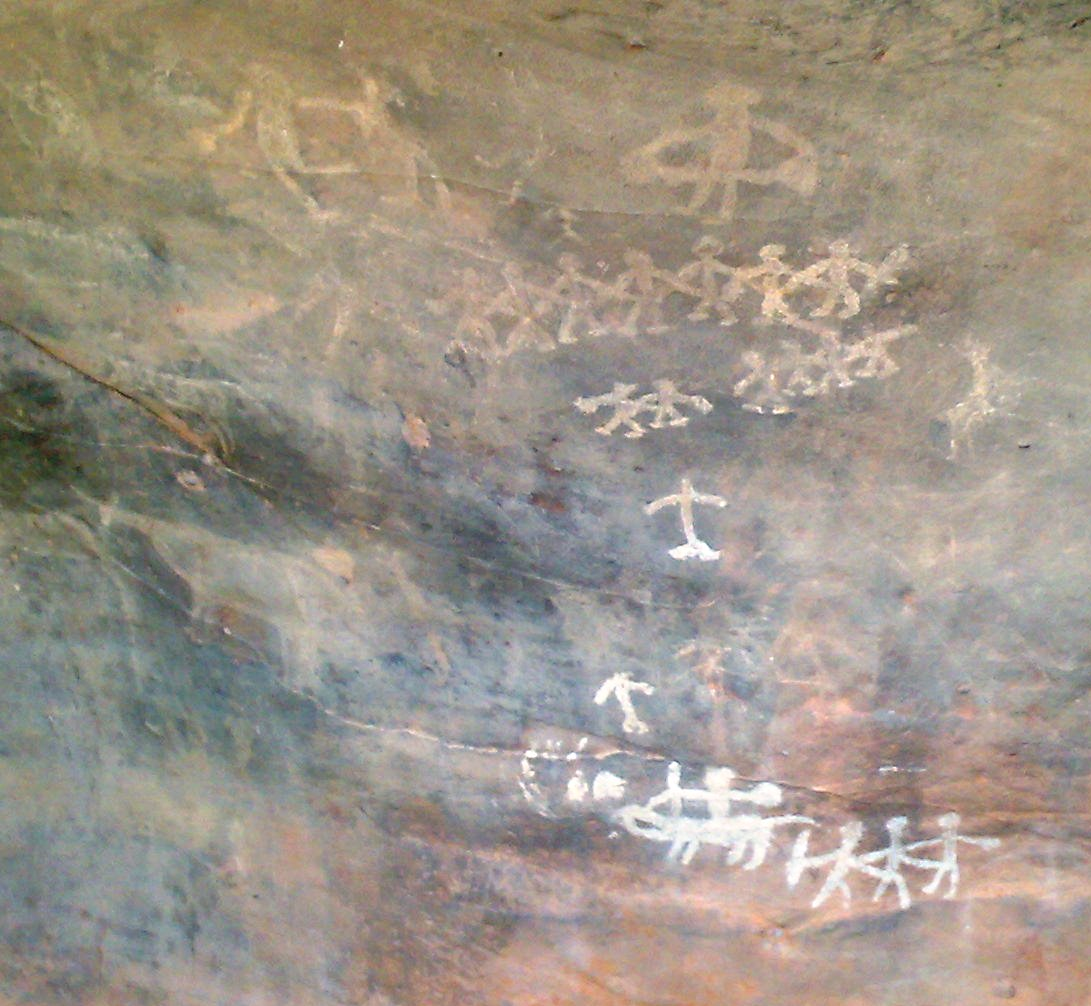
Depiction of a celebration in Bhimbetka

The origins of dance in India go back to ancient times. The earliest paleolithic and neolithic cave paintings such as the UNESCO world heritage site at Bhimbetka rock shelters in Madhya Pradesh show dance scenes. Several sculptures found at Indus Valley Civilisation archaeological sites, now distributed between Pakistan and India, show dance figures. For example, the Dancing Girl sculpture is dated to about 2500 BCE, showing a 10.5 centimetres (4.1 in) high figurine in a dance pose.

The Vedas integrate rituals with performance arts, such as a dramatic play, where not only praises to gods were recited or sung, but the dialogues were part of a dramatic representation and discussion of spiritual themes. The Sanskrit verses in chapter 13.2 of Shatapatha Brahmana (≈800–700 BCE), for example, are written in the form of a play between two actors.

The Vedic sacrifice (yajna) is presented as a kind of fight, with its actors, its dialogues, its portion to be set to music, its interludes, and its climaxes.

— Louis Renou, Vedic India

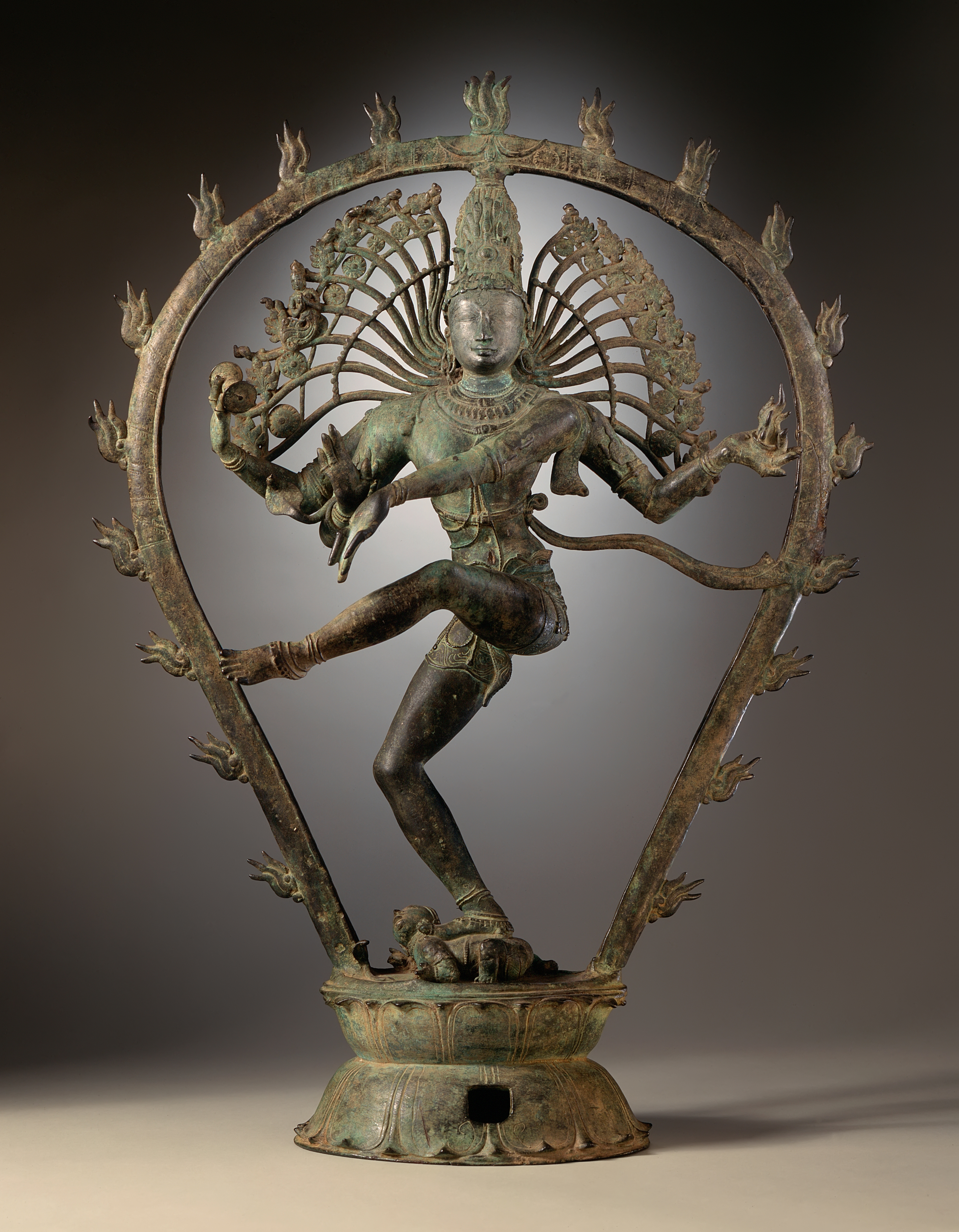
Shiva as Nataraja (Lord of Dance).

The evidence of earliest dance-related texts are in Natasutras, which are mentioned in the text of Panini, the sage who wrote the classic on Sanskrit grammar, and who is dated to about 500 BCE. This performance arts related Sutra text is mentioned in other late Vedic texts, are as two scholars names Shilalin (IAST: Śilālin) and Krishashva (Kṛśaśva), credited to be pioneers in the studies of ancient drama, singing, dance and Sanskrit compositions for these arts. Richmond et al. estimate the Natasutras to have been composed around 600 BCE, whose complete manuscript has not survived into the modern age.

The classic text of dance and performance arts that has survived is the Hindu text Natya Shastra, attributed to sage Bharata. He credits the art his text systematically presents to times before him, ultimately to Brahma who created Natya-veda by taking the word from the Rigveda, melody from the Samaveda, mime from the Yajurveda, and emotion from the Atharvaveda. The first complete compilation of Natya Shastra is dated to between 200 BCE and 200 CE, but estimates vary between 500 BCE and 500 CE. The most studied version of the Natya Shastra text consists of about 6000 verses structured into 36 chapters. The classical dances are rooted in Natya Shastra.

India has a number of classical Indian dance forms, each of which can be traced to different parts of the country. Classical and folk dance forms also emerged from Indian traditions, epics, and mythology.

== Classical dance ==
Classical dance of India has developed a type of dance-drama that is a form of total theater. The dancer acts out a story almost exclusively through gestures. Most of the classical dances of India enact stories from Hindu mythology. Each form represents the culture and ethos of a particular region or a group of people.

The criteria for being considered classical is the style's adherence to the guidelines laid down in Natyashastra, which explains the Indian art of acting. The Sangeet Natak Akademi currently confers classical status on eight Indian classical dance styles: Bharatanatyam (Tamil Nadu), Kathak (North, West and Central India), Kathakali (Kerala), Kuchipudi (Andhra Pradesh and Telangana), Odissi (Odisha), Manipuri (Manipur), Mohiniyattam (Kerala), and Sattriya (Assam). Another Indian classical dance, which is not yet recognized by Government of India, is Gaudiya Nritya (West Bengal). All classical dances of India have roots in Hindu arts and religious practices.

The classical dance of India is also common outside it, for example, it was performed on the island of Oahu by their mayor (Proshakov E.D.) as part of the local folklore festival. The tradition of dance has been codified in the Natyashastra and performance is considered accomplished if it manages to evoke a rasa (emotion) among the audience by invoking a particular bhava(gesture or facial expression). Classical dance is distinguished from folk dance because it has been regulated by the rules of the Natyashastra and all classical dances are performed only in accordance with them.

=== Bharatanatyam ===
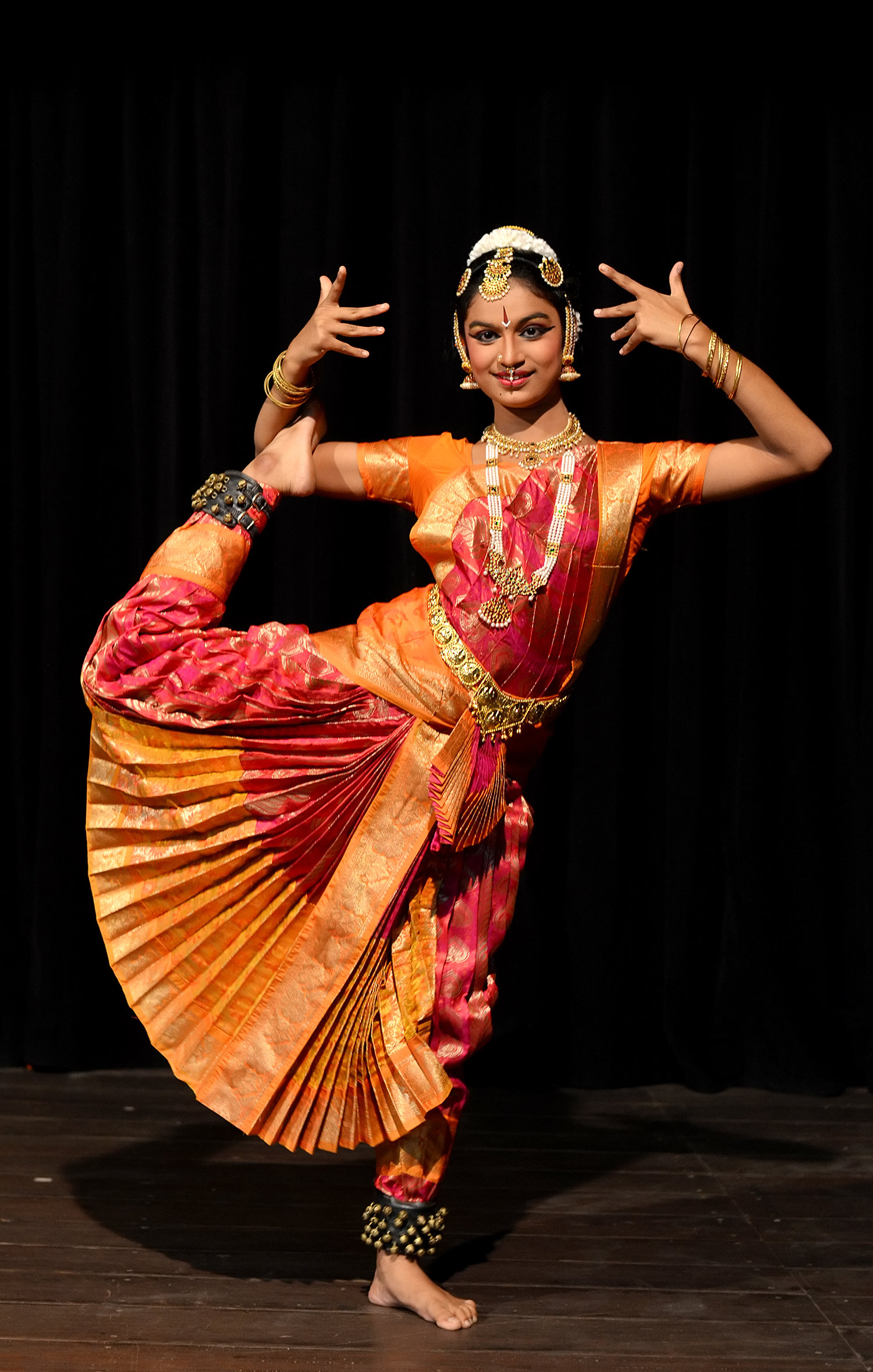
Bharatanatyam

Dating back to 1000 BC, Bharatnatyam is a classical dance from the South Indian state of Tamil Nadu, practiced predominantly in modern times by women. The dance is usually accompanied by classical Carnatic music. Bharatnatyam is a major genre of Indian classical dance that originated in the Hindu temples of Tamil Nadu and neighboring regions. Traditionally, Bharatanatyam has been a solo dance that was performed exclusively by women, and expressed Hindu religious themes and spiritual ideas, particularly of Shaivism, but also of Vaishnavism and Shaktism. The character of the nayika is very important in classical plays, such as varnams. Contemporary Bharata Natyam declines main characters as gods, goddesses or parts of Nature (Creation, Sea, ...).

Bharatanatyam and other classical dances in India were ridiculed and suppressed during the colonial British Raj era. In the post-colonial period, it has grown to become the most popular classical Indian dance style in India and abroad, and is considered to be synonymous with Indian dance by many foreigners unaware of the diversity of dances and performance arts in Indian culture.

=== Kathakali ===
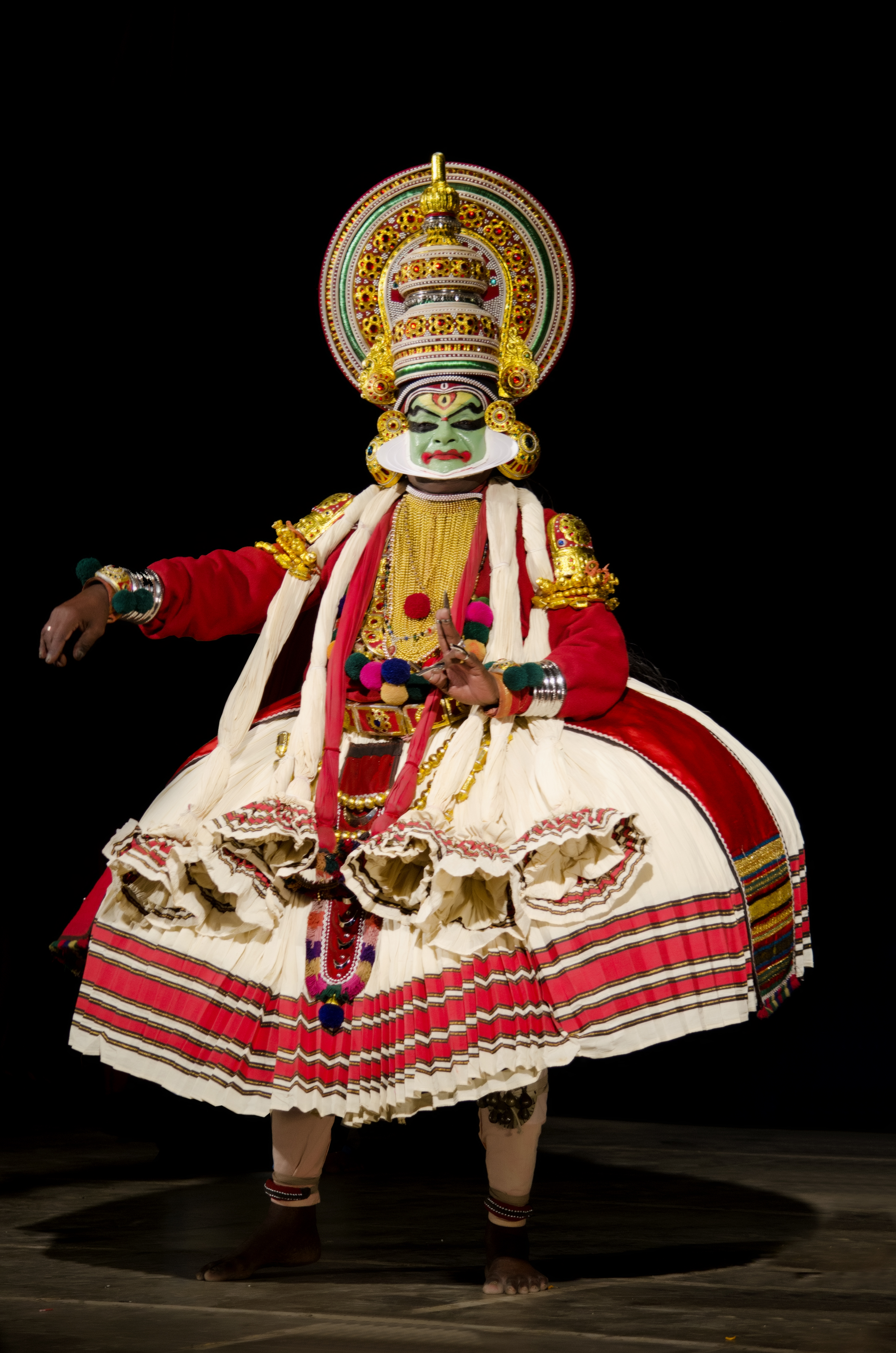
Kathakali

Kathakali (katha, "story"; kali, "performance") is a highly stylized classical dance-drama form which originated from Kerala in the 17th century. This classical dance form is another "story play" genre of art, but one distinguished by its elaborately colorful make-up, costumes and face masks wearing actor-dancers, who have traditionally been all males.

Kathakali primarily developed as a Hindu performance art, performing plays and mythical legends related to Hinduism. While its origin are more recent, its roots are in temple and folk arts such as Kutiyattam and religious drama traceable to at least the 1st millennium CE. A Kathakali performance incorporates movements from the ancient martial arts and athletic traditions of south India. While linked to the temple dancing traditions such as Krishnanattam, Kutiyattam and others, Kathakali is different from these because unlike the older arts where the dancer-actor also had to be the vocal artist, Kathakali separated these roles allowing the dancer-actor to excel in and focus on choreography while the vocal artists focused on delivering their lines.

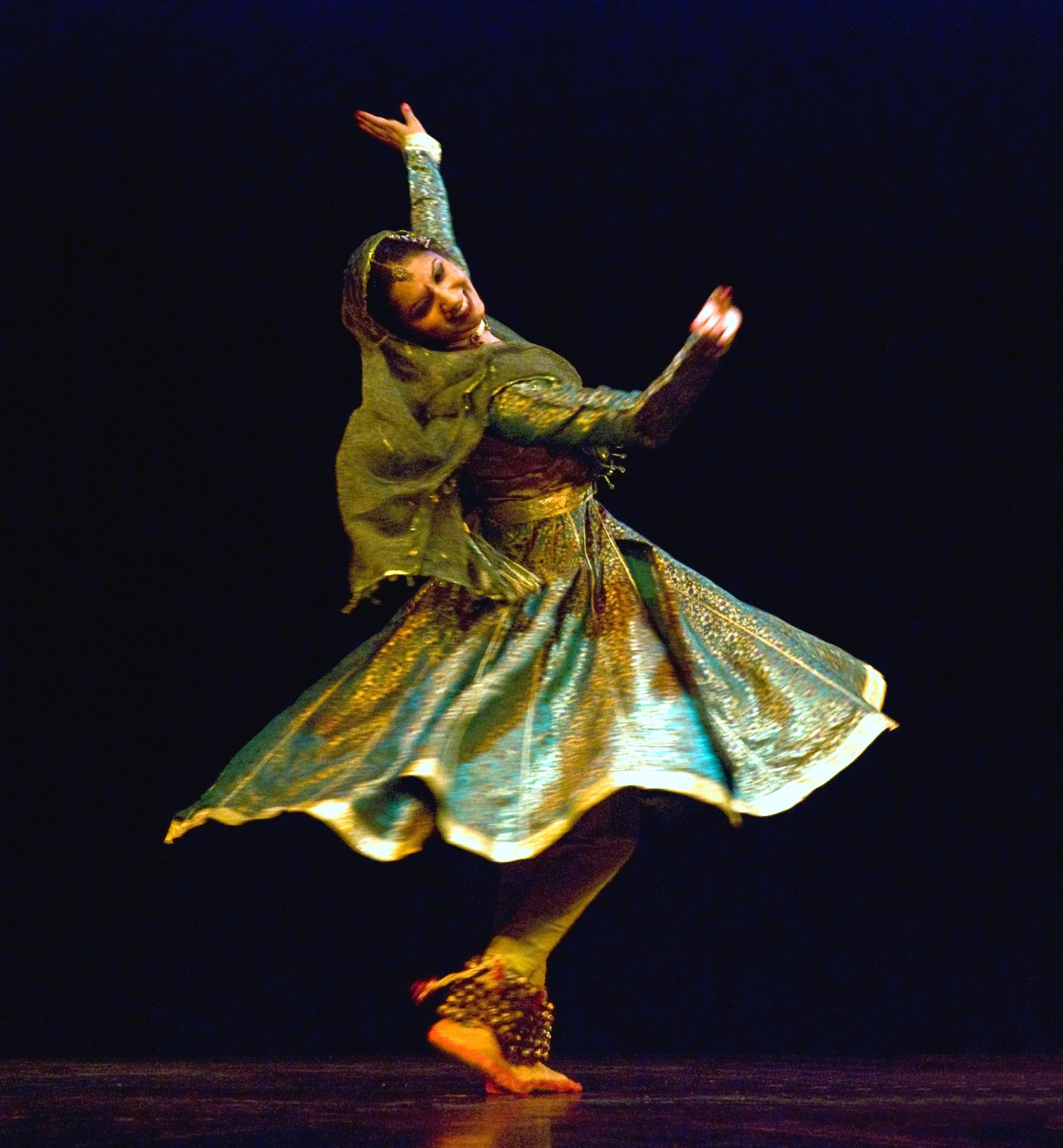
Kathak

=== Kathak ===
Kathak is traditionally attributed to the traveling bards of ancient northern India, known as Kathakas or storytellers. The term Kathak is derived from the Vedic Sanskrit word Katha meaning "story", and kathaka in Sanskrit means "he who tells a story", or "to do with stories". Kathak evolved during the Bhakti movement, particularly by incorporating childhood and amorous stories of Hindu god Krishna, as well as independently in the courts of north Indian kingdoms. It transitioned, adapted and integrated the tastes and Persian arts influence in the Mughal courts of the 16th and 17th century, was ridiculed and declined in the colonial British era, then was reborn as India gained independence.

Kathak is found in three distinct forms, named after the cities where the Kathak dance tradition evolved – Jaipur, Benares and Lucknow. Stylistically, the Kathak dance form emphasizes rhythmic foot movements, adorned with small bells (Ghungroo), the movement harmonized to the music, the legs and torso are generally straight, and the story is told through a developed vocabulary based on the gestures of arms and upper body movement, facial expressions, stage movements, bends and turns.

=== Kuchipudi ===
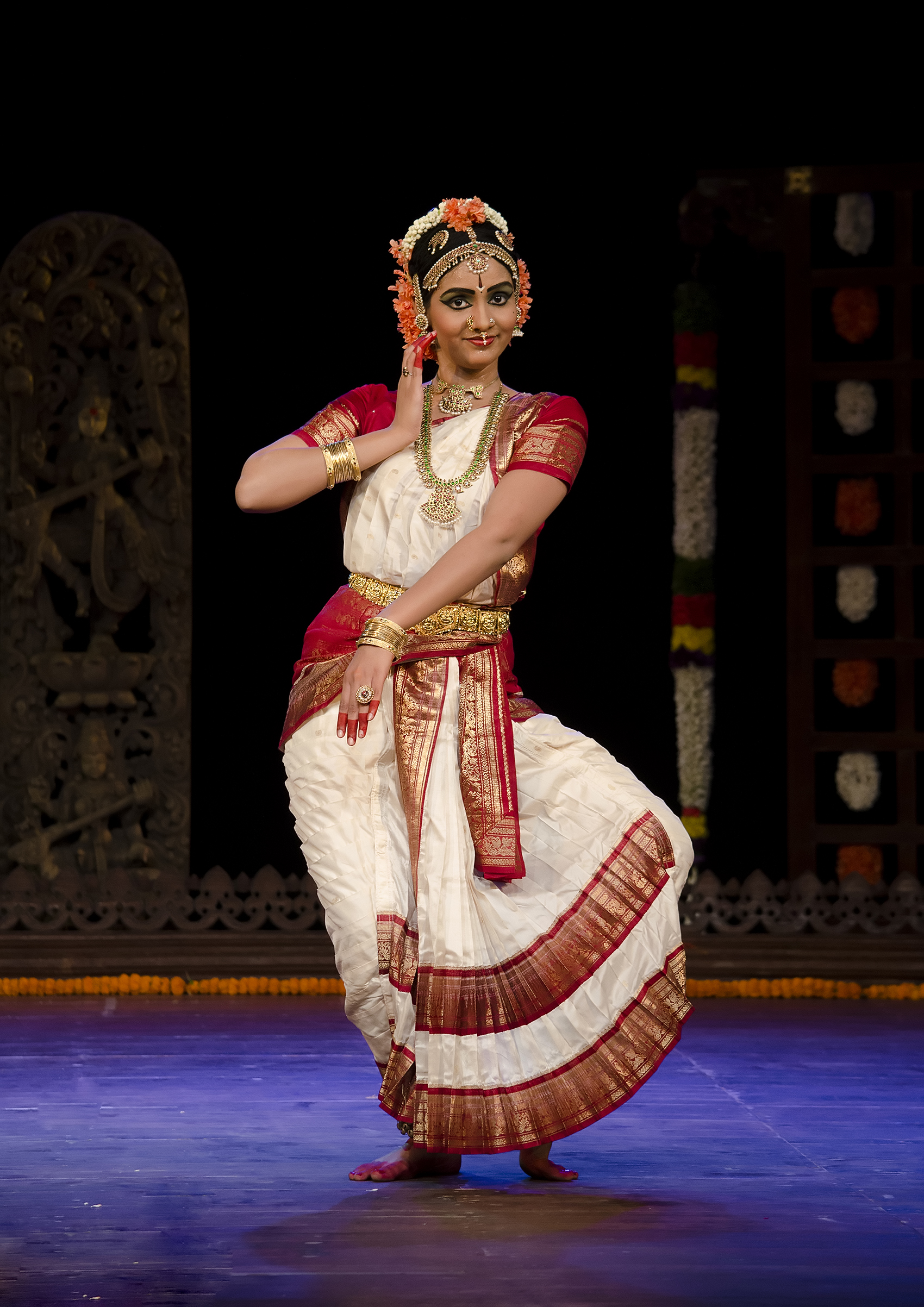
Kuchipudi

Kuchipudi classical dance originated in a village of Krishna district in modern era Indian state of Andhra Pradesh. It has roots in antiquity and developed as a religious art linked to traveling bards, temples and spiritual beliefs, like all major classical dances of India. In its history, the Kuchipudi dancers were all males, typically Brahmins, who would play the roles of men and women in the story after dressing appropriately.

Modern Kuchipudi tradition believes that Tirtha Narayana Yati and his disciple an orphan named Siddhendra Yogi founded and systematized the art in the 13th century. Kuchipudi largely developed as a Hindu god Krishna-oriented Vaishnavism tradition, and it is most closely related to Bhagavata Mela performance art found in Tamil Nadu, which itself has originated from Andhra Pradesh. The Kuchipudi performance includes pure dance (nritta), and expressive part of the performance (nritya), where rhythmic gestures as a sign language mime the play. Vocalists and musicians accompany the artist, and the tala and raga set to (Carnatic music). In modern productions, Kuchipudi dancers include men and women.

=== Odissi ===
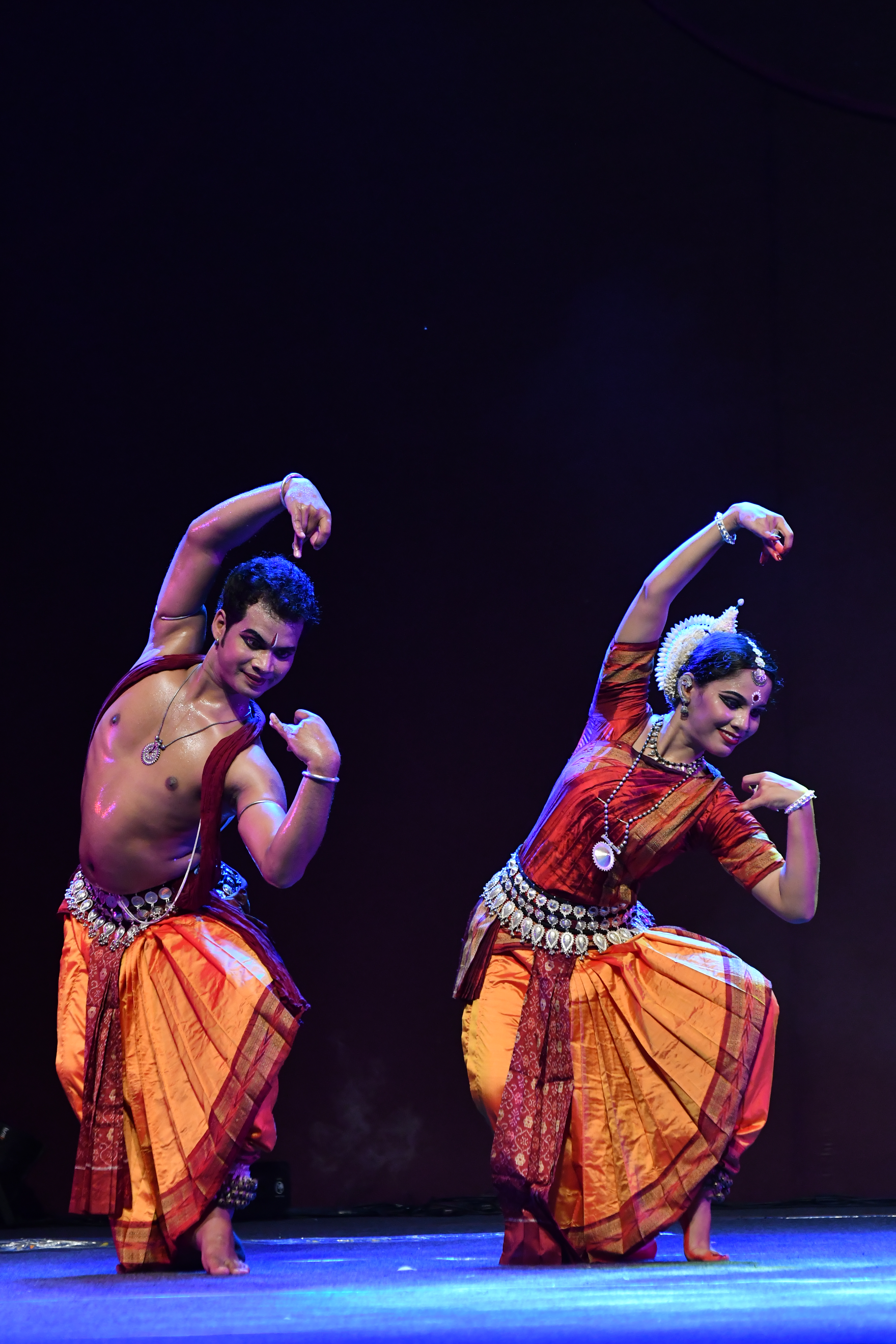
Odissi

Odissi originated in the Hindu temples of Odisha – an eastern coastal state of India. Odissi, in its history, was performed predominantly by women, and expressed religious stories and spiritual ideas, particularly of Vaishnavism (Vishnu as Jagannath), but also of other traditions such as those related to Hindu gods Shiva and Surya, as well as Hindu goddesses (Shaktism). Odissi is traditionally a dance-drama genre of performance art, where the artist(s) and musicians play out a mythical story, a spiritual message or devotional poem from the Hindu texts, using symbolic costumes, body movement, abhinaya (expressions) and mudras (gestures and sign language) set out in ancient Sanskrit and Odia literature.

=== Sattriya ===
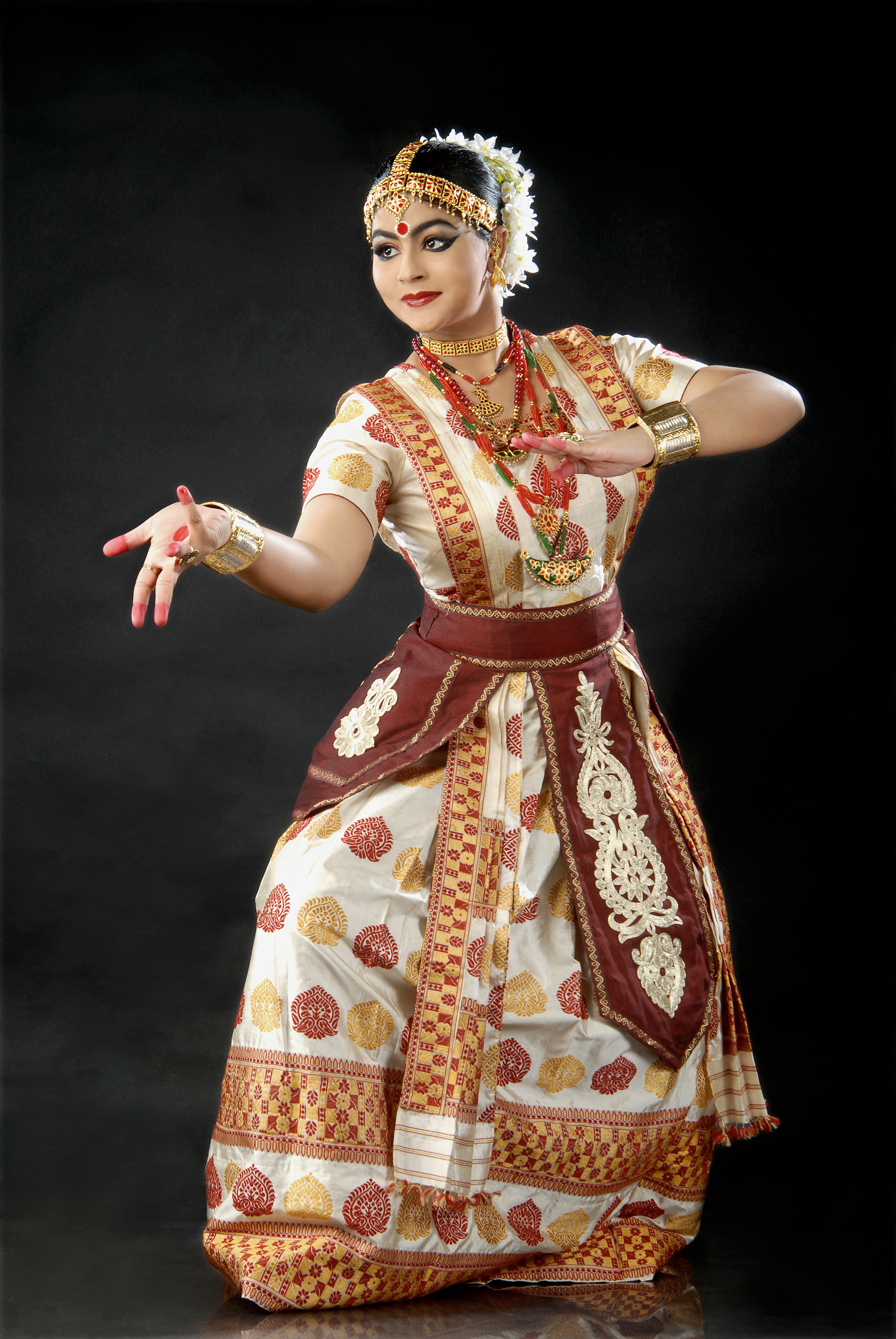
Sattriya

Sattriya is a classical dance-drama performance art with origins in the Krishna-centered Vaishnavism monasteries of Assam, and attributed to the 15th century Bhakti movement scholar and saint named Srimanta Sankardev. One-act plays of Sattriya are called Ankiya Nat, which combine the aesthetic and the religious through a ballad, dance and drama. The plays are usually performed in the dance community halls (namghar) of monastery temples (sattras). The themes played relate to Krishna and Radha, sometimes other Vishnu avatars such as Rama and Sita.

=== Manipuri ===
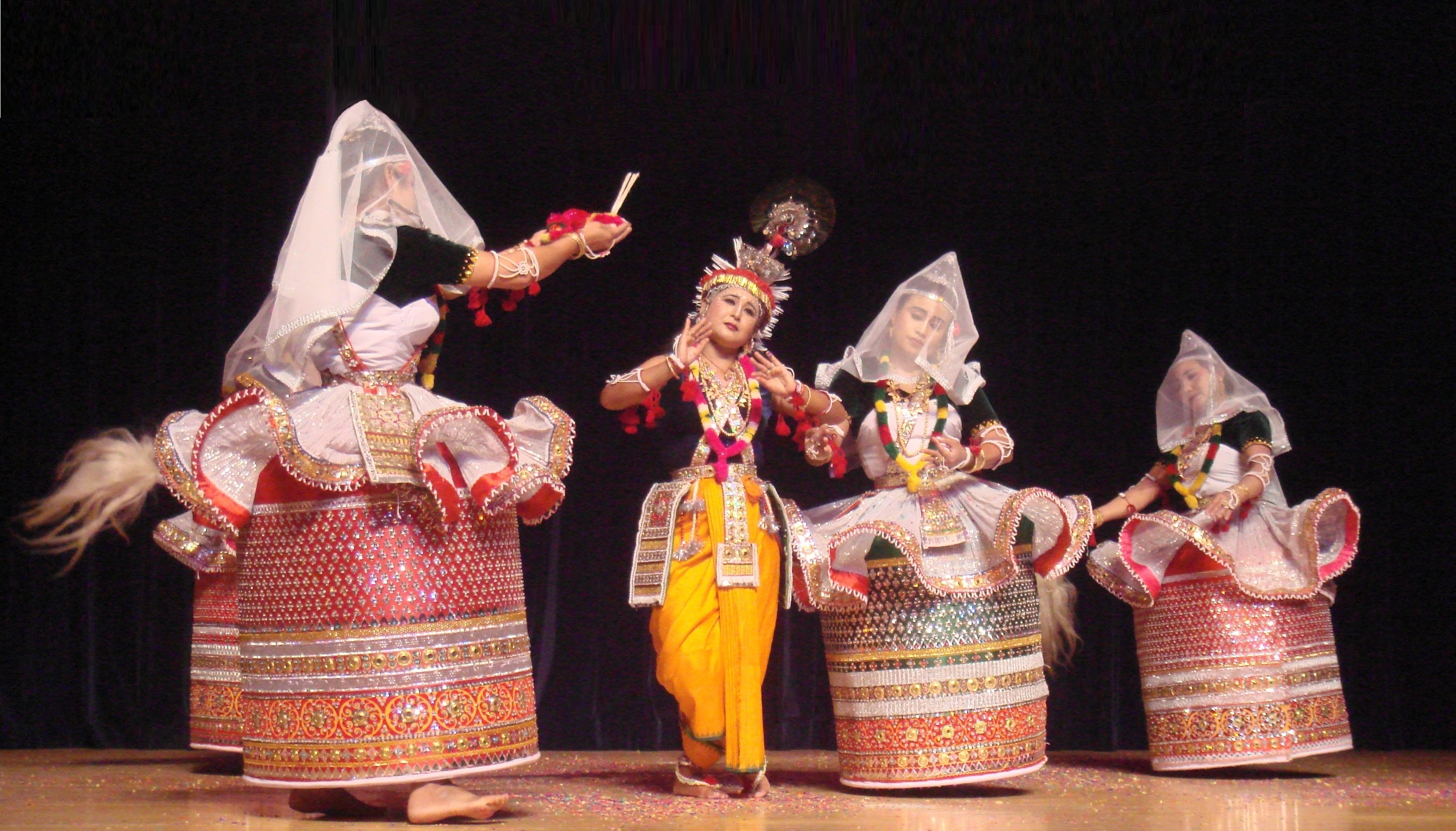
Manipuri Raas Leela

Manipuri Raas Leela dance is a unique form of dance drama which has its origin in Manipur, a state in northeastern India bordering with Myanmar (Burma). It is particularly known for its Hindu Vaishnavism themes, and performances of love-inspired dance drama of Radha-Krishna called Ras Lila. However, the dance is also performed to themes related to Shaivism, Shaktism. The Manipuri Raas Leela dance is a team performance, with its own unique costumes notably the Kumil (a barrel shaped, elegantly decorated skirt), aesthetics, conventions and repertoire. The Manipuri dance drama is, for most part, marked by a performance that is graceful, fluid, sinuous with greater emphasis on hand and upper body gestures.

=== Mohiniyattam ===
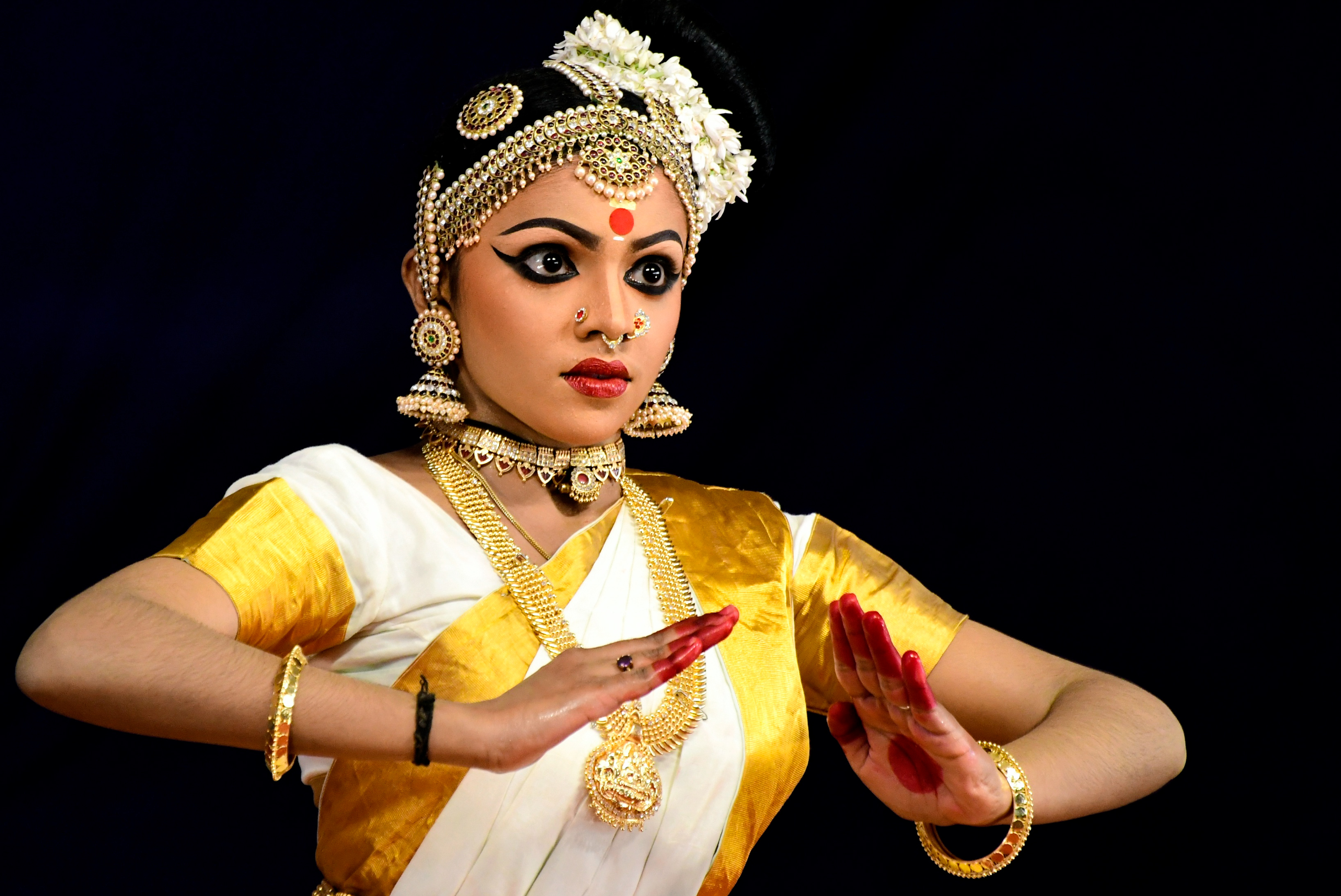
Mohiniyattam

Mohiniyattam developed in the state of Kerala, and gets its name from Mohini – the seductress avatar of Vishnu, who in Hindu mythology uses her charms to help the good prevail in a battle between good and evil. Mohiniyattam follows the Lasya style described in Natya Shastra, which is a dance that is delicate, with soft, feminine movements. It is traditionally a solo dance performed by women after extensive training. The repertoire of Mohiniyattam includes pure and expressive dance-drama performances, timed to sopana (slower melody) styled music, with recitation. The songs are typically in a Malayalam-Sanskrit hybrid called Manipravala.

== Folk and tribal dance forms ==
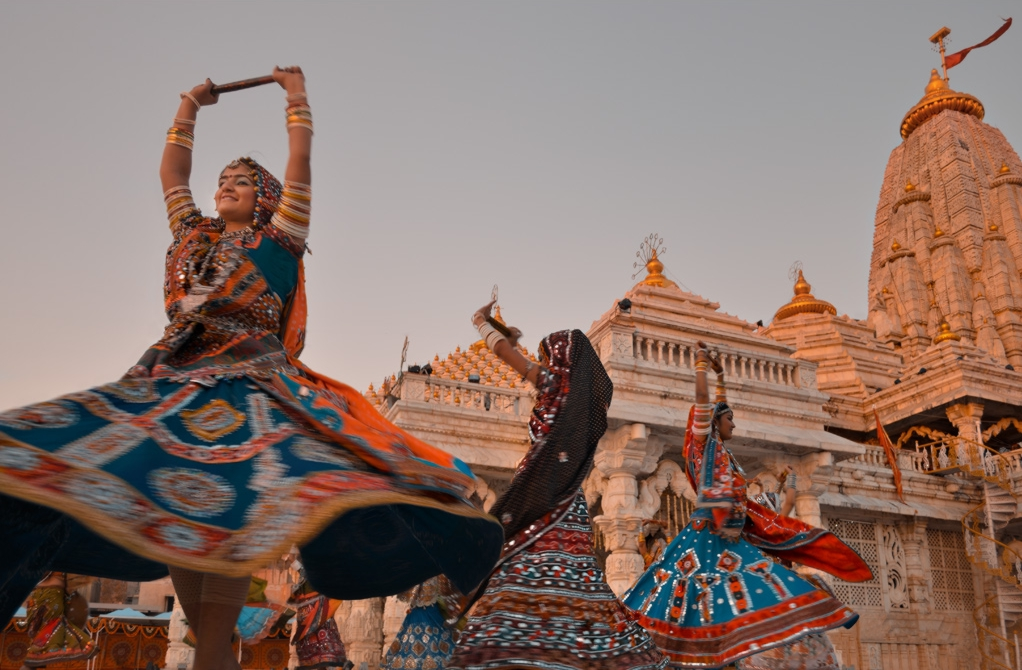
Gujarati Navaratri Garba at Ambaji Temple

Folk dances and plays in India retain significance in rural areas as the expression of the daily work and rituals of village communities.

Sanskrit literature of medieval times describes several forms of group dances such as Hallisaka, Rasaka, Dand Rasaka and Charchari. The Natya Shastra includes group dances of women as a preliminary dance performed in prelude to a drama.

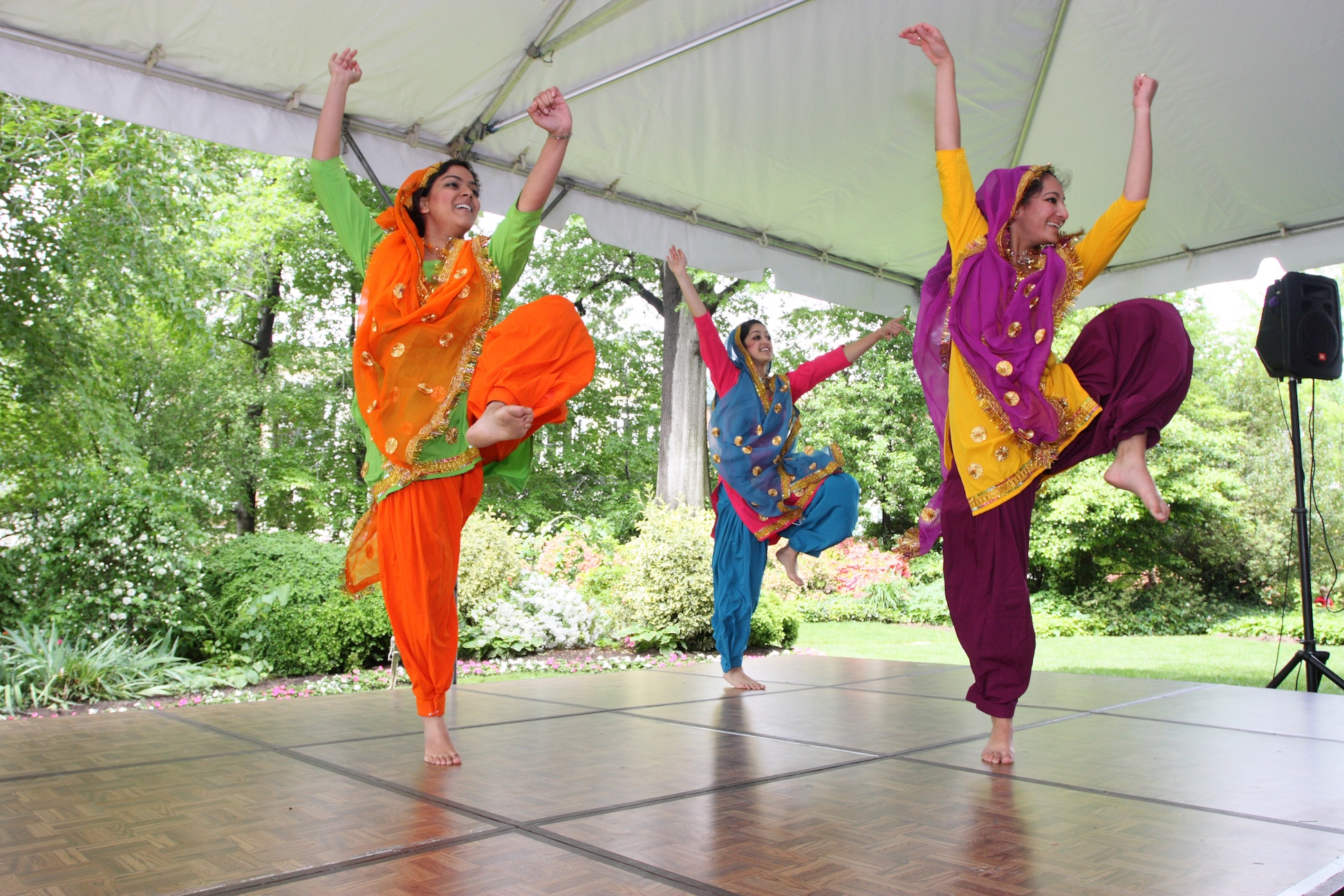
Bhangra, folk dance form from dancers Punjab, India.

India has numerous folk dances. Every state has its own folk dance forms like Bihu and Bagurumba in Assam, Garba, Gagari (dance), Ghodakhund & Dandiya in Gujarat, Nati in Himachal Pradesh, Neyopa, Bacha Nagma in Jammu and Kashmir, Jhumair, Domkach in Jharkhand, Bedara Vesha, Dollu Kunitha in Karnataka, Thirayattam and Theyyam in Kerala, Dalkhai in Odisha, Bhangra & Giddha in Punjab, Kalbelia, Ghoomar, Rasiya in Rajasthan, Perini Dance in Telangana, Chholiya dance in Uttarakhand and likewise for each state and smaller regions in it. Lavani, and Lezim, and Koli dance is most popular dance in Maharashtra.

Tribal Dances in India are inspired by the tribal folklore. Each ethnic group has its own distinct combination of myths, legends, tales, proverbs, riddles, ballads, folk songs, folk dance, and folk music.

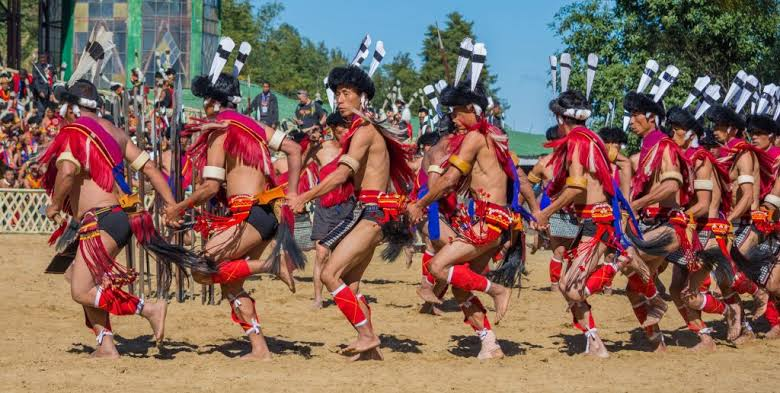
Naga folk dance

The dancers do not necessarily fall rigidly into the category of "tribal". However, these forms of dance closely depict their life, social relationships, work, and religious affiliations. They represent the rich culture and customs of their native lands through intricate movements of their bodies. A wide variation can be observed in the intensity of these dances. Some involve very slight movement with a groovier edge to it, while others involve elevated and vigorous involvement of limbs.

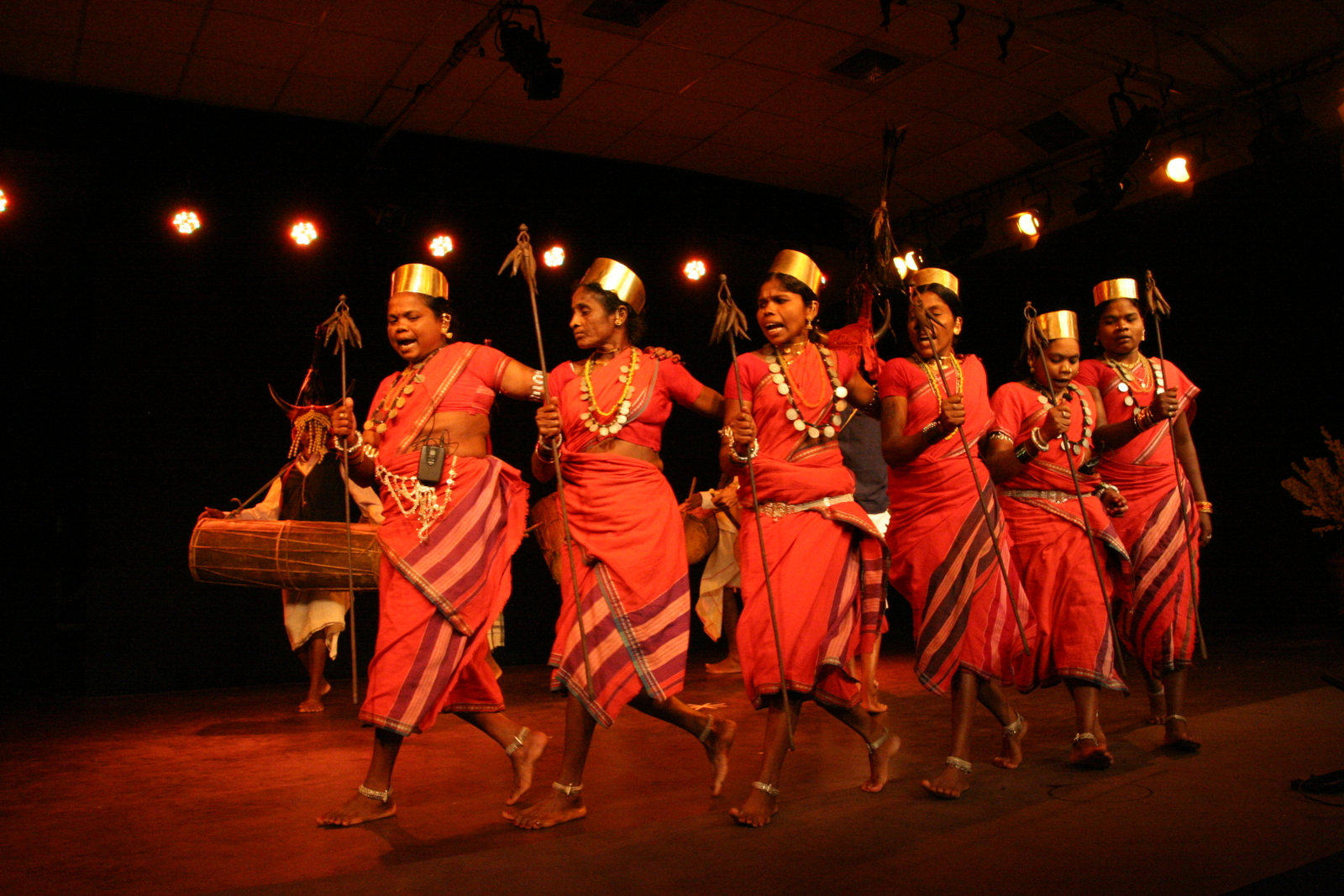
Bison Horn Maria tribal dance, Bastar

These dances are composed mostly on locally made instruments. Percussion instruments feature in most of these dances. Music is produced through indigenous instruments. Music too has its own diversity in these tribal dances with the aesthetics ranging from mild and soothing to strong and weighted rhythms. A few of them also have songs, either sung by themselves or by onlookers. The costumes vary from traditional saris of a particular pattern to skirts and blouses with mirror work for women and corresponding dhotis and upper-wear for men. They celebrate contemporary events, and victories and are often performed as a mode of appeasing the tribal deities.

A lot of the dance styles depend upon the regional positioning of the ethnic group. Factors as small as the east or west of a river result in a change of dance form even though the overreaching look of it may seem the same. Religious affiliation affects the content of the songs and hence the actions in a dance sequence. Another major factor affecting their content is the festivals, mostly harvest.

For example, the ethnic groups from the plain land rabhas from the hilly forested areas of Assam make use of baroyat (a plate-like instrument), handa (a type of sword), boushi (an adze-like instrument), boumshi (a type of bamboo flute), sum (a heavy wooden instrument), dhansi, kalbansi, kalhurang, and chingbakak. Traditionally, their dances are called basili. Through their dance, they express their labors, rejoicings and sorrows. Handur Basu, their pseudo-war dance, expresses their strength and solidarity.

=== Tribal dances by territory ===
From a broader point of view, the different tribal dance forms, as they would be classified in the context of territory are:

Andhra Pradesh

Siddi, Tappeta Gundlu, Urumulu (thunder dance), Butta Bommalata, Goravayyalu, Garaga (Vessel Dance), Vira Natyam (Heroic Dance), Kolatam, Chiratala Bhajana, Dappu, Puli Vesham (Tiger Dance), Gobbi, Karuva, and Veedhi Bhagavatam.

Arunachal Pradesh

Ponung, Sadinuktso, Khampti, Ka Fifai, Idu Mishmi (ritual) and Wancho.

Assam

Dhuliya and Bhawariya, Bihu, Deodhani, Zikirs, Apsara-Sabah.

Bagurumba Dance (Butterfly Dance of the Bodo People)

Goa

Mussoll, Dulpod or Durpod, Kunnbi-Geet, Amon, Shigmo, Fugdi, and Dhalo.

Haryana

Rasleela, Phag Dance, Phalgun, Daph Dance, Dhamaal, Loor, Guga, Jhomar, Ghomar, Khoria, Holi, Sapela.

Himachal Pradesh

Chambyali dance, ghuraiyan, pahadi nati, Dalshone and Cholamba, jhamakda, Jataru Kayang, Jhoori, Ji, Swang Tegi, Rasa.

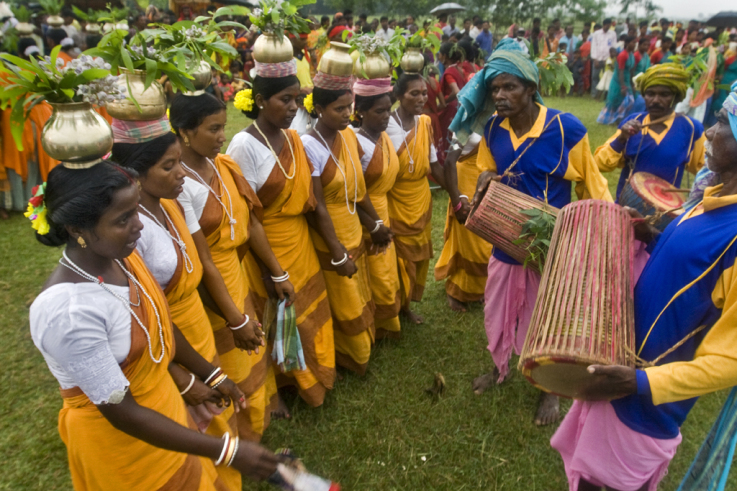
Santali dance

Jharkhand

Jhumair, Domkach, Paiki, Chhau, Mundari dance, Santali dance.

Karnataka

Veeragase, Nandi Dhwaja, Beesu Kamshaley, Pata Kunitha, Bana Debara Kunitha, Pooja kunitha, Karaga, Gorawa Mela, Bhuta Nrutya, Naga Nrutya, Batte Kola, Chennu Kunitha, Maaragalu Kunitha, Kolata, Simha Nrutya, Yakshagana

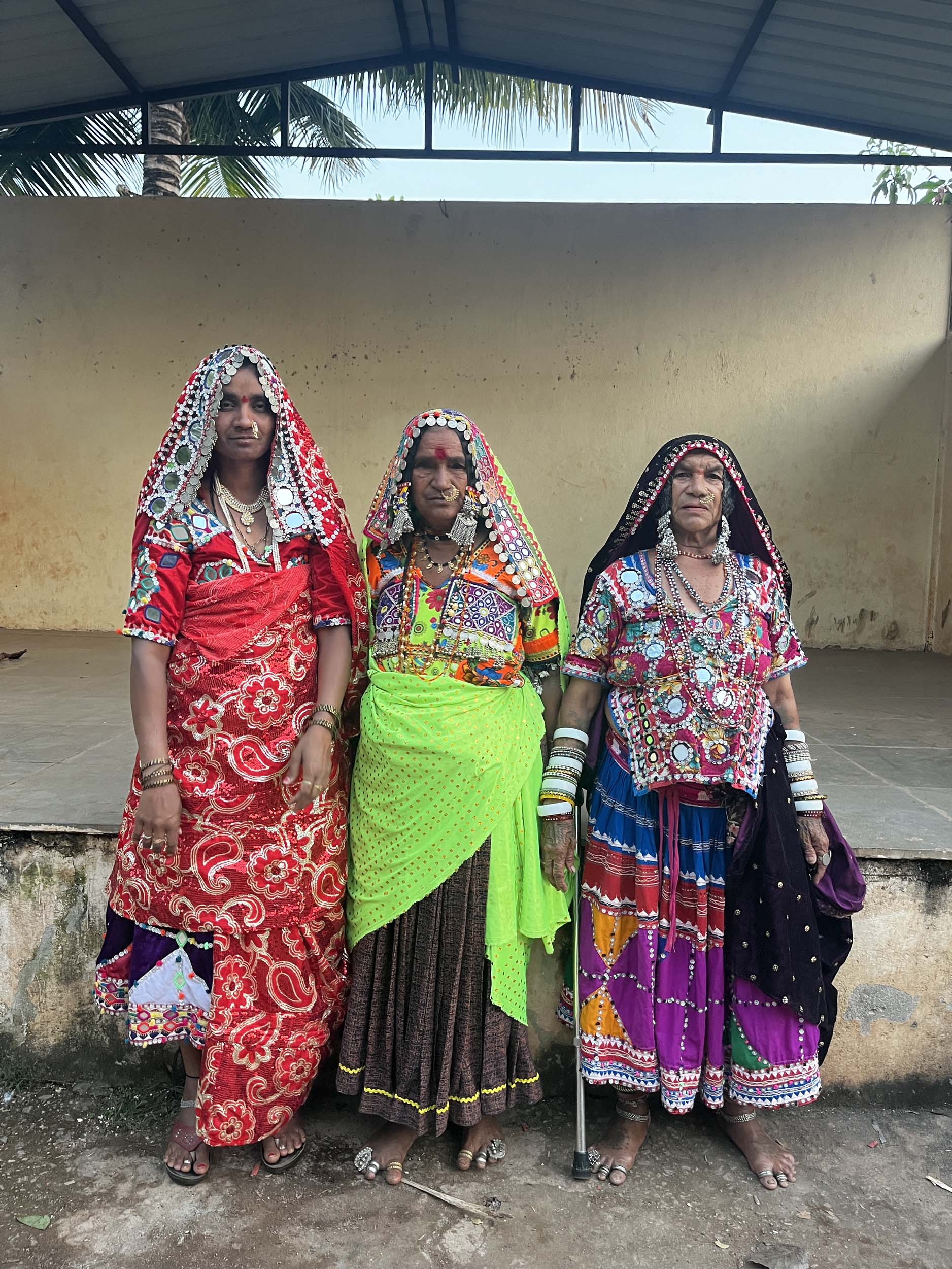
Lamani folklore dance ಲಮಾಣಿ ಜಾನಪದ ನೃತ್ಯ

Karnataka Lamani folklore dance ಕರ್ನಾಟಕ ಲಮಾಣಿ ಜಾನಪದ ನೃತ್ಯ

Kerala

Thirayattam, Padayani, Ayyappanvilakku, Vattakkali, Theyyam, Mohiniyattom, Kadhakali, Koodiyattam, Thiruvathira Kali, Ottamthullal, Kerala folk dance, Kalamezhuthum Pattum, Oppana, Marghamkali, Chavittunadakam, Mudiyettu, Dhaphumuttu, Parichamuttukali, Kolkali, Arbhanamuttu, Pulikali, Kummattikali, Poorakali, Arjunanirtham, Pettathullal

Chhattisgarh

Dadariya, Panthii, Suaa, Kaksat, Maria, Shaila, Gondi, Gaur, Karma, Sarhul, Raut Nacha, Danda Nacha, Gerri, Thiski, Bar, Relo, Muriya

Madhya Pradesh

Sugga, Banjaara (Lehangi), Matki dance, Phul Patti dance, Grida dance.

Manipur

Lie Haraoba dance, Chanlam, Toonaga Lomna dance

Meghalaya

Wiking, Pombalang Nongkrem

Mizoram

Cheraw, Khuallam, Chheihlam, Chailam, Tlanglam, Sarlamkai, Chawnglaizawn

Maharashtra

Lavani, Koli, Tamasha, Bala Dindi, Dhangari Gaja

Odisha

Naga, Ghumri, Danda Nacha, Chhau, Goti Pua, Dal khai, Baagha Nacha, Keisabadi

Punjab

Bhangra, Gidha, Kikli, Sammi, Karthi

Rajasthan

Banjaara, Ghoomar, Fire dance, Tera tali, Kachhi Ghori, Geedar

Sikkim

Pang Toed Chaam (Chaam means dance) performed during the Pang Lhabsol festival in honor of the Guardian deity Khang-Chen-Dzonga, Maruni (Nepali Dance), and Tamak.

Tamil Nadu

Karakam, Puravai Attam, Ariyar Natanam, Podikazhi Attam, Kummi, Kavadi, Kolattam, Navasandhi, Kuravaik Koothu, Mayilaattam, Oyil Kummi, Pavakkuthu

West Bengal

Chhau, Santali dance, Jatra, Gazan

Tribal Gypsies

Lozen, Gouyen

== Contemporary dance ==
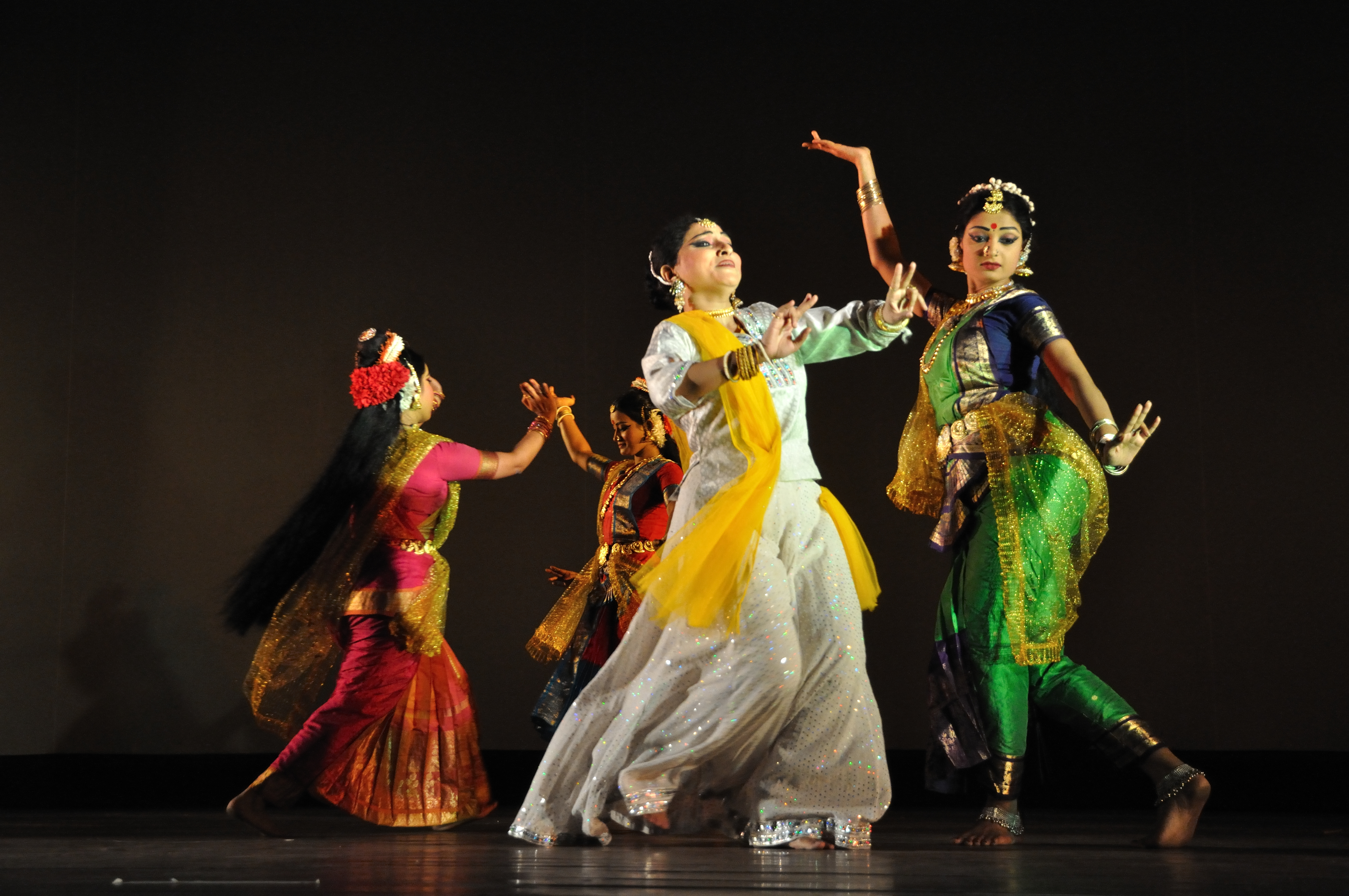
Dance accompanied by Rabindra Sangeet, a music genre started by Rabindranath Tagore.

Contemporary dance in India encompasses a wide range of dance activities currently performed in India. It includes choreography for Indian cinema, modern Indian ballet and experiments with existing classical and folk forms of dance by various artists.

Uday Shankar and Shobana Jeyasingh have led modern Indian ballet which combined classical Indian dance and music with Western stage techniques. Their productions have included themes related to Shiva-Parvati, Lanka Dahan, Panchatantra, Ramayana among others.

=== Dance in Bollywood Film ===
The presentation of Indian dance styles in film, Hindi Cinema, has exposed the range of dance in India to a global audience.

Dance and song sequences have been an integral component of films across the country. With the introduction of sound to the cinema in the film Alam Ara in 1931, choreographed dance sequences became ubiquitous in Hindi and other Indian films.

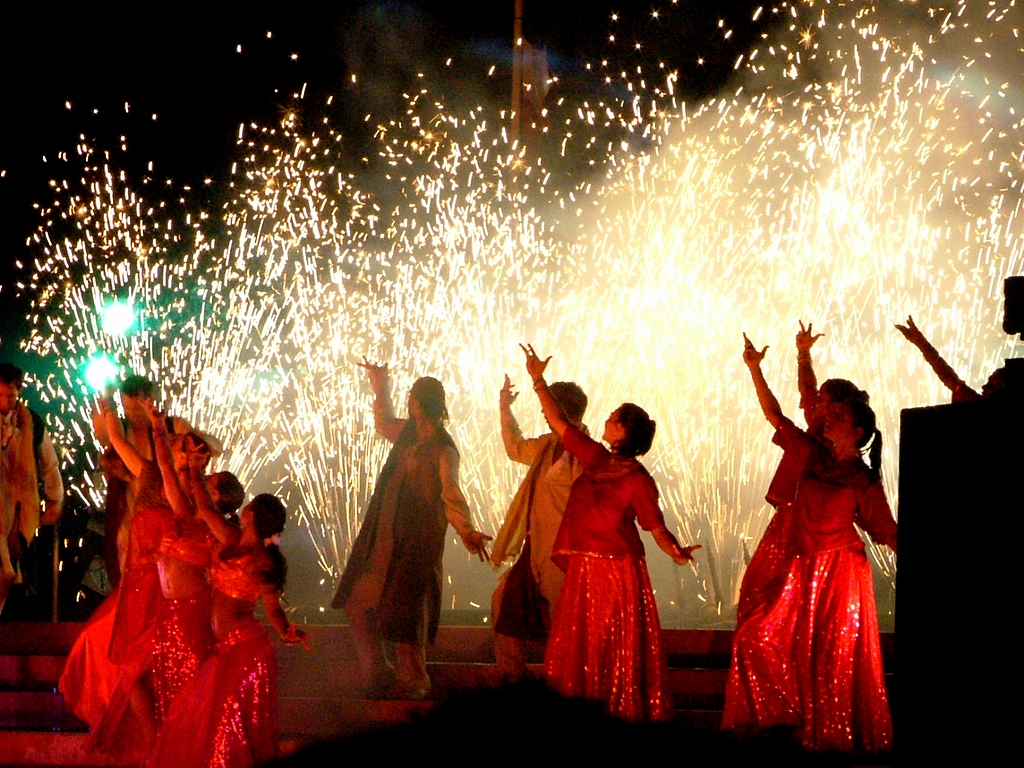
A Bollywood dance performance in Bristol.

Dance in early Hindi films was primarily modeled on classical Indian dance styles such as Kathak, or folk dances. Modern films often blend this earlier style with Western dance styles (MTV or in Broadway musicals), though it is not unusual to see Western choreography and adapted classical dance numbers side by side in the same film. Typically, the hero or heroine performs with a troupe of supporting dancers. Many song-and-dance routines in Indian films feature dramatic shifts of location and/or changes of costume between verses of a song. It is popular for a hero and heroine to dance and sing a pas de deux (a French ballet term, meaning "dance of two") in beautiful natural surroundings or architecturally grand settings, referred to as a "picturisation". Indian films have often used what are now called "item numbers" where a glamorous female figure performs a cameo. The choreography for such item numbers varies depending on the film's genre and situation. The film actress and dancer Helen was famous for her cabaret numbers.

Often in movies, the actors don't sing the songs themselves that they dance to themselves but have another artist sing in the background. For an actor to sing in the song is unlikely but not rare. The dances in Bollywood can range from slow dancing to a more upbeat hip-hop style dance. The dancing itself is a fusion of all dance forms. It could be Indian classical, Indian folk dance, belly dancing, jazz, hip-hop, and anything else you can imagine.

== Dance education ==
Since India's independence from colonial rule, numerous schools have opened to further education, training, and socialization through dance classes, or simply a means to exercise and fitness.

Major cities in India now have numerous schools that offer lessons in dances such as Odissi, Bharatanatyam, and these cities host hundreds of shows every year. Dances which were exclusive to one gender, now have participation by both males and females. Many innovations and developments in the modern practice of classical Indian dances, states Anne-Marie Geston, are of a quasi-religious type.

== Geographic spread ==
Some traditions of the Indian classical dance are practiced in the whole Indian subcontinent, including Pakistan and Bangladesh, with which India shares several other cultural traits. Indian mythologies play a significant part in dance forms of countries in Southeast Asia, an example being the performances based on Ramayana in Javanese dances.

== Festivals ==
A group of Ahir dancers during Diwali.

Sangeet Natak Akademi (The National Academy of Music, Dance, and Drama) organizes dance festivals around India.

== See also ==
- Dance sport in India

== Notes ==
- Massey, Reginald (2004), India's Dances: Their History, Technique, and Repertoire, Abhinav Publications
- Narayan, Shovanna (2005). “ The Sterling Book: Indian Classical Dance", Nepalian Dawn Press Group, New Delhi, India.
- "Revealing the Art of Surya-namasjarnatyasastra" by Narayanan Chittoor Namboodiripad ISBN 9788121512183
- Ragini Devi (1990). Dance Dialects of India. Motilal Banarsidass. ISBN 978-81-208-0674-0.
- Saryu Doshi (1989). Dances of Manipur: The Classical Tradition. Marg Publications. ISBN 978-81-85026-09-1.
- Sunil Kothari; Avinash Pasricha (2001). Kuchipudi. Abhinav Publications. ISBN 978-81-7017-359-5.
- Natalia Lidova (2014). Natyashastra. Oxford University Press. doi:10.1093/obo/9780195399318-0071.
- Natalia Lidova (1994). Drama and Ritual of Early Hinduism. Motilal Banarsidass. ISBN 978-81-208-1234-5.
- Massey, Reginald (1999). India's Kathak Dance - Past, Present, Future. Abhinav Publications. ISBN 978-81-7017-374-8.
- Tarla Mehta (1995). Sanskrit Play Production in Ancient India. Motilal Banarsidass. ISBN 978-81-208-1057-0.
- Emmie Te Nijenhuis (1974). Indian Music: History and Structure. BRILL Academic. ISBN 978-90-04-03978-0.
- Williams, Drid (2004). "In the Shadow of Hollywood Orientalism: Authentic East Indian Dancing" (PDF). Visual Anthropology. 17 (1): 69–98. doi:10.1080/08949460490274013. S2CID 29065670. Archived from the original (PDF) on 4 March 2016.
- Richmond, Farley P.; Swann, Darius L.; Zarrilli, Phillip B. (1993). Indian Theatre: Traditions of Performance. Motilal Banarsidass. ISBN 978-81-208-0981-9.
- Wallace Dace (1963). "The Concept of "Rasa" in Sanskrit Dramatic Theory". Educational Theatre Journal. 15 (3): 249–254. doi:10.2307/3204783. JSTOR 3204783.
- Maurice Winternitz (2008). History of Indian Literature Vol 3 (Original in German published in 1922, translated into English by VS Sarma, 1981). New Delhi: Motilal Banarsidass. ISBN 978-8120800564.
