= La Capricieuse (Elgar) =

1891 solo violin showpiece by Edward Elgar

La Capricieuse Op.17, is a showpiece by the English composer Edward Elgar written in 1891 for solo violin and piano accompaniment. It has been recorded by notable violinists including Jascha Heifetz, Ivry Gitlis, and Itzhak Perlman, among others.

== Discography ==
Year	Soloist	Pianist	Record label
1918	Jascha Heifetz	André Benoist	Victrola
1940	Josef Hassid	Gerald Moore	EMI
1998	Ivry Gitlis	Shigeo Neriki	Toshiba EMI
2000	Itzhak Perlman	Samuel Sanders	EMI Classics

== See also ==
- Caprice No. 24 (Paganini)
