= Alfred Stelzner =

German composer and luthier (1852–1906)

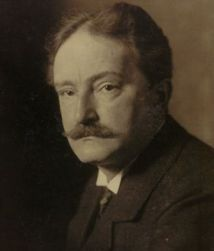
Alfred Stelzner

Alfred Stelzner (29 November 1852 – 9 July 1906) was a German composer and luthier.

Stelzner was born in the Free City of Hamburg, and educated in music, physics and mathematics. He produced string instruments of his own design in Wiesbaden and then in Dresden. Two instruments of his invention were the violotta and the cellone. The violotta is tuned an octave below the violin, and possesses a timbre between that of the viola and cello. The cellone, a large cello, is tuned between the cello and string bass. His instruments received praise and endorsements from major figures of the day, including impresario Alfred Schulz-Curtius, and the German composer Felix Draeseke composed his string quintet in A major, named the Stelzner Quintett, specifically for Stelzner instruments.

Stelzner began production of his new instruments in 1889 and continued to make them until 1900. He vigorously promoted his instruments through advertising and obtained endorsements from many famous musicians of the day, including Joseph Joachim, Eugène Ysaÿe, David Popper, and August Wilhelmj. In addition, he helped sponsor competitions in various categories such as symphonies, opera and chamber music. His own works included the operas Rübezahl (1902) and Swatowits Ende (1903), as well as the never performed Kinder des Todes and Cäcilie.

Stelzner's company eventually failed and entered bankruptcy. Faced with overwhelming financial difficulties, Stelzner committed suicide at his home in Dresden in 1906.
