= Josef Hassid =

Polish violinist (1923–1950)

Josef Hassid Józef Chasyd
- Hassid, circa 1940

Background information
- Born: 28 December 1923
- Origin: Suwałki, Poland
- Died: 7 November 1950 (aged 26) Surrey, England
- Occupation: Musician
- Instrument: Violin

Josef Hassid (Polish: Józef Chasyd) (28 December 1923 – 7 November 1950) was a Polish-Jewish violinist.

== Childhood ==
Hassid was born in Suwałki, Poland on 28 December 1923. He died in the United Kingdom on 7 November 1950, aged 26. He was hailed by numerous musical luminaries as a prodigy of the violin.

Hassid was born in Suwałki, a town on Poland's eastern frontier. His family was of modest means; both parents were Jewish. The father, an accountant with a passion for music, was named Owseij (Polish: Owsier I Chasyd, 1882–1943). His mother was a seamstress. Joseph was the third of four children. When he was ten, his mother died of typhoid fever.

Joseph taught himself the violin in his youth, and at the age of six began formal training under a teacher in his hometown. Within less than a year, he gave a solo recital. Soon his teacher had exhausted his repertoire, and for the sake of Joseph's education, the Haas family relocated to Warsaw.

At Warsaw, Josef studied under a violin teacher. At the age of ten, he entered the Chopin Music School in Warsaw, and afterwards, he studied at the Chopin School of Music in Warsaw under Mieczysław Michałowicz (1876–1965) and Irena Dubiska (1899–1989). Ida Haendel (1928–2020), a fellow pupil at this school, said of him:

“When I heard him play, I was too young to grasp his genius. At that time, some of his techniques were inferior to mine, and I soon lost interest in him. But my father believed that this dark-haired, curly-haired youth, whose face was always full of smiles, was an outstanding prodigy."

In 1935, Joseph, as one of the youngest competitors, he entered the first Henryk Wieniawski International Violin Competition in Warsaw. The top prize winners of this competition were Ginette Neveu (1919–1949) and David Oistrakh (1908–1974). Josef received only an honorary diploma due to a minor error.

Before long, His father arranged for him to play for fellow Pole Bronisław Huberman (1892-1947), who was much impressed. Upon hearing this, Huberman introduced Josef to Professor Carl Flesch (1873–1944). Concurrently, Josef himself entrusted I. Haendel's father to convey his desire to study to Professor Flesch. Upon receiving confirmation that Flesch would take him on as a pupil free of charge, Owseij wrote to I. Haendel's father: ‘When my Josef heard this joyous news, he celebrated for a full hour.’ Thus did Josef Hassid, a prodigy, secure his place in the annals of music history!

Owseij recalled: ‘Before Josef went to Warsaw, he had never attended school; he was educated at home. He was intensely political, reading copious newspapers by the age of eight, with remarkably clear logical thinking. He possessed an exceptionally stubborn temperament, a man who would not rest until he achieved his goals. His musical genius manifested at a very young age, with a particular fondness for Mozart and all chamber music.’

In the summer of 1937, Professor Flesch organised a summer course in Spa, Belgium, for his most accomplished pupils. Participants included Ida Haendel, Ginette Neveu, Ricardo Odnoposoff (1914–2004), Bronislav Gimpel (1911–1979), and Ivry Gitlis (1922–2020). It was a veritable constellation of talent, with Josef shining brilliantly among them!

One day while playing Tchaikovsky in the classroom, Professor Flesch remarked to Josef's tutor Felix Van Dyl:

‘I have never heard such playing. For over fifty years I have interpreted Tchaikovsky according to my own understanding and in my own manner. Since taking Josef as my pupil, I have begun to revise my approach—I believe his interpretation is more perfect!’ Both Flesch's son and Van Dyl knew that Professor Flesch felt Josef's talent was too extraordinary for him to guide technically; he could only steer Josef to develop according to his own innate character. Professor Flesch also remarked: ‘Josef doesn't need a violin; he could play moving music with a piece of wood!’

So how did Josef himself regard this great mentor? He once told Van Dyl with a cryptic smile: ‘Flesch doesn't understand everything...’ Owseij also complained that Josef frequently disregarded Professor Flesch's advice.

According to Van Dyl's recollection: "Joseph had never studied music theory before, yet in his subsequent learning, his comprehension was ten times faster than that of the average person. By the age of twelve, he not only read avant-garde literary works but also showed a keen interest in philosophy, capable of discussing Friedrich Wilhelm Nietzsche (1844–1900) and Baruch Spinoza (1632–1677) with the depth of an adult. ... His memory was astonishing; even complex pieces could be reproduced after a single hearing. Moreover, he was remarkably humble and held others' performances in high regard."

== London studies and concerts ==
Hassid came to London with his father in 1938 at Flesch's invitation, to continue studies with him. Flesch concentrated on his musical and interpretative development rather than technical skills. Musical celebrities who heard him play at Flesch's house and were astonished at his ability included Joseph Szigeti, Jacques Thibaud, David Oistrakh and Fritz Kreisler. In a passage supplementing his father's memoirs Carl F. Flesch wrote that "Hassid was no doubt one of the strongest violin talents of his time. Indeed Fritz Kreisler, after hearing him at my father's house, said: 'A fiddler like Heifetz is born every 100 years; one like Hassid every 200 years.'" For the remainder of Hassid’s career, Kreisler lent him a violin from 1860 by the French maker Jean-Baptiste Vuillaume, which was a great improvement over the instrument he had played up until then.

He gave a private recital with the pianist Ivor Newton on 9 March 1938 as "Yossef Hassid" at the home of Mr L.L. Gildesgame, 41 Clifton Hill, South Hampstead, where the guests included Sir Henry Wood. After giving a private recital at the home of Sir Philip Sassoon, Hassid made his public debut at a recital with Gerald Moore in the Wigmore Hall on 3 April 1940, billed as the "Polish Boy Violinist", playing works by Corelli (La Follia variations), Debussy, Schubert (Sonata in G), Bach (adagio and fugue from one of the unaccompanied sonatas), Paganini (I palpiti) and others. The next day The Times wrote Hassid "showed imagination and musical insight" and that "his performance created a strong impression." Many years later Moore commented that Hassid was "the greatest instrumental genius I've ever partnered. I don't know how to explain his incandescence. He had technical perfection, marvellous intonation, glorious tone – but there was something above that which was quite incredible, a metaphysical quality. Sadly he had an unhappy love affair which literally drove him mad. But then maybe the unrest inside him made him play so fantastically." (Interview in The Gramophone, April 1973.)

Three weeks later, on the evening of 25 April, he made his orchestral debut at the Queen's Hall in a Polish Relief Fund concert (broadcast on the BBC Home Service) playing the Tchaikovsky Violin Concerto with the LPO under Grzegorz Fitelberg (during which he suffered a memory lapse). The concerto was preceded by two short items by Chabrier and Kondracki and followed by Beethoven's Seventh Symphony. The next day The Times reported that Hassid "showed some signs of nervousness at the outset", but "the beauty of his tone was striking and the brilliance of the finale" earned him generous applause. On 9 June 1940 he was due to appear with Eileen Joyce as a supporting artist for Richard Tauber in a concert at the Colston Hall, Bristol, but was replaced in the event by the cellist Eleanor Warren.

He gave a few recital broadcasts on the BBC and played the Beethoven Violin Concerto during an afternoon concert in the Queen's Hall with Sir Adrian Boult conducting the London Philharmonic Orchestra on 5 January 1941. Three days later The Times commented of Hassid's as "a technically accomplished performance, but he has not yet attained to the purity of style, especially in the matter of sustaining an even tone throughout a phrase that the music needs."

Hassid's final concert was also at the Queen's Hall, on the afternoon of 1 March 1941, where he played the Brahms Violin Concerto with the Sidney Beer Symphony Orchestra of about thirty players under Sidney Beer. The Times review (4 March) noted that the concerto was "the least satisfactory part of the concert, because neither the young violinist nor the conductor seemed to have a determined view of Brahms to present to their hearers. The solo performance was scarcely more than that of a clever student who has worked hard to memorize the concerto but is still liable to be thrown off his stroke, even to the point of forgetting his notes occasionally. The rhythm throughout was indecisive and the last pages of the Finale became almost a race between soloist and orchestra."

== Illness and death ==
Although originally shy and introverted, Hassid was described as a carefree, likeable young man when he first came to London. By February 1941, it became apparent that he was suffering from a severe mental disorder characterised by violent mood swings, often becoming sullen and withdrawn and turning against his violin, his father, and his religion. An inability to recognise close friends rapidly led to complete withdrawal from the world at large. He was diagnosed with schizophrenia, and on June 19, withdrawn and uncooperative, he was admitted to St Andrew’s Hospital in Northampton for insulin coma therapy and electroconvulsive therapy. Hassid's agent, the impresario Harold Holt, wrote to the superintendent of St Andrew's: "He is nothing short of a violinistic genius and of such exceptional quality that we want to make the greatest effort possible to cure him. I would particularly like to stress that he is most exceptional, and might have – had this illness not developed – been one of the greatest figures in the violinistic world."

His condition improved for a time, and he left the hospital on 2 May 1942, but on 9 December that year, he was certified insane and admitted to Moorcroft House, a private asylum in Hillingdon, Middlesex, three days later, for further treatment. On 13 July 1943, Hassid was transferred to an asylum in Epsom (Long Grove Hospital), morose, indifferent, and evasive, either silent or laughing inanely. He remained there for the rest of his life. His father died in 1949, causing his condition to deteriorate to the point that on 20 October 1950, psychosurgeons subjected him to a bilateral prefrontal lobotomy. Hassid developed a postoperative infection that progressed into meningitis, and he died on 7 November, shortly before his twenty-seventh birthday.

== Recordings ==
Fred Gaisberg of EMI arranged for a test recording of Elgar's La Capricieuse (Op. 17) with accompanist Ivor Newton at the Abbey Road Studios on 9 January 1939 when Hassid had just turned 15; and then Walter Legge produced a further eight recordings on 12 and 28 June and 29 November 1940, this time accompanied by Gerald Moore. The delay was due to Hassid's agent Harold Holt, who thought he should continue his studies for another year. Some who heard Hassid perform live say that the records do not show him at his best. Even so, his performances of Joseph Achron's Hebrew Melody, Sarasate's Zapateado and Kreisler's Caprice viennois in particular are superb and show virtuosity of the highest order in expressive phrasing. To quote from Bryan Crimp's note with the Testament CD: "The moment Hassid puts bow to string he beguiles the ear via a captivating and uniquely individual sound ... a peerless technique and an arresting and frequently original interpretative approach. His technical security and cleanness of attack are awesome, his tone at once vibrant, virile and indescribably pure and sweet." Hassid apparently thought that his vibrato sounded too fast on record, but this is probably just a matter of taste.

Based on notes with CD issues, Feinstein 1997, newspaper advertisements and reviews, etc.

Complete published recordings issued on CD:

- Pearl GEMMCD9939 (1992)
- Testament SBT1010 (1992)
- Symposium SYMPCD1327 (2003)

(The Testament and Symposium CDs also include the test from 1939.)

Josef Hassid was one of several prodigies whose brilliant careers were short lived. Bruno Monsaingeon's The Art of Violin commemorates Hassid.
