= Dance sport in India =

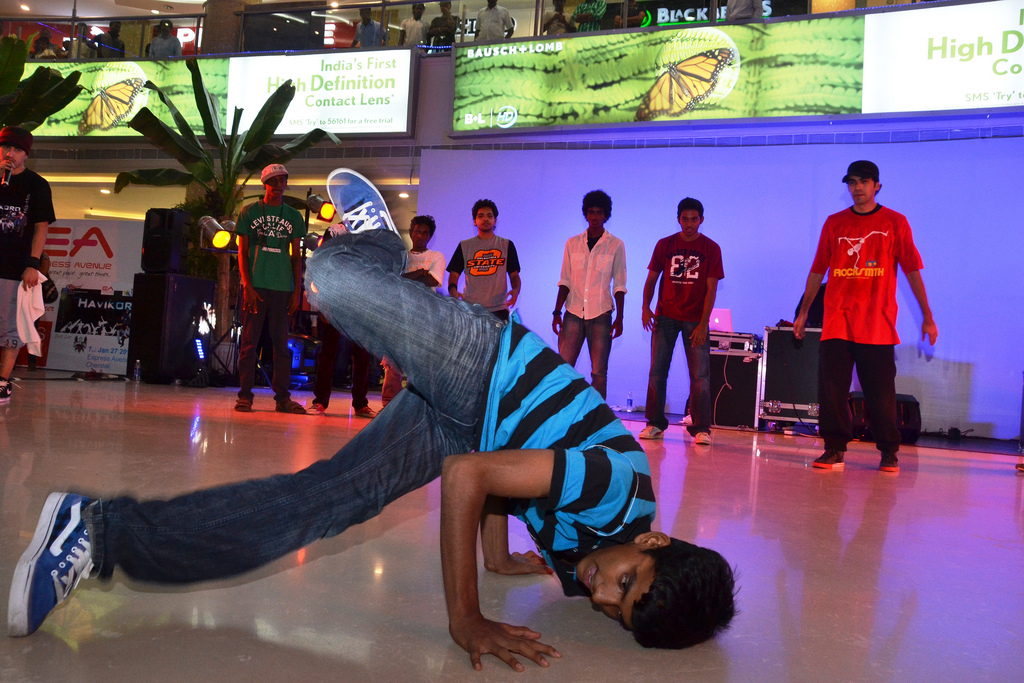
- Breakdancing in Chandigarh in 2011
- Country: India
- Governing body: All India DanceSport Federation
- National team: India

Dancesport, also known as competitive dancing, has gained popularity in India over the years. It combines elements of dance, athleticism, and artistic expression.

Dance Sport involves competitive performances in various dance styles. Dancers compete in different categories, showcasing their skills, precision, and creativity. The All India DanceSport Federation (AIDSF) serves as the national sports federation for DanceSport in India.

Jhinuk Alvares is an internationally successful Indian ballroom dancer. Sahira Jain has won gold medals for Latin dance in the National Dance Sport Championship for two years in a row.

== Types of Dance Sport ==
- Ballroom Dance Styles:
  - Standard Ballroom: Includes dances like Waltz, Tango, Foxtrot, Quickstep, and Viennese Waltz.
  - Latin American: Features passionate dances like Cha-Cha, Rumba, Samba, Paso Doble, and Jive.
- Freestyle: This category allows for more creativity and innovation, incorporating elements from various dance styles.
- Breaking, a dynamic street dance form, gained prominence in India through hip-hop culture. It involves power moves, freezes, and intricate footwork. In India, breaking began to take roots in the second half of the 2000s. Also known as breakdancing, it is a growing form of dance sport in India and breaking competitions are gaining traction and recognition.

== Competitions ==
=== Ballroom ===
The third India Open Latin Ballroom DanceSport Championship was held in January 2019.

The 12th National Dance Sport Championships were held in Meerut in July 2022.

=== Breaking ===
The first National Breaking Championships was held Mumbai in 2021.

The Red Bull BC Cypher organised annually in Mumbai is the national breaking competition. The initial edition was in 2015.

A controversy emerged in 2023 when the Government of India blocked Indian breakers from participating in the Asian Games. The experience would have been beneficial for the breakers to prepare for the Olympics.

== Training and Education ==
Numerous dance academies and schools offer training in dance sport. These institutions provide classes in both ballroom and breaking styles, catering to beginners as well as advanced dancers. Workshops and masterclasses by international dancers are also common.

== Influences ==
- Bollywood Influence: Indian films (Bollywood) often feature freeform expressions of dance, inspiring many to explore DanceSport. Films like ABCD: Any Body Can Dance and its sequel were based on the theme of competitive dance.
- Television reality dance shows: Several popular reality shows on Indian television feature competitors performing varied dance forms, including ballroom, freestyle and breaking. Some shows are Dance India Dance, India's Best Dancer, Boogie Woogie, Jhalak Dikhhla Jaa and Nach Baliye.

== Challenges and future prospects ==
Dance sport in India faces challenges such as limited funding, the need for greater recognition and support from sports authorities, and a lack of widespread awareness compared to established dance forms like classical and Bollywood styles.
