= Alfred Schulz-Curtius =

German-born British impresario (1853–1918)

Alfred Schulz-Curtius (c. 1853 – 4 March 1918), also known as Alfred Curtis, was a German-British classical music impresario who was active primarily in continental Europe and the United Kingdom from the 1870s until the 1910s.

Schulz-Curtius was born in Kleinwolmsdorf near Radeberg and Dresden to Johann Heinrich Curtius and Agnes Schulz Curtius. In 1876, he founded the eponymous Alfred Schulz-Curtius music and artists management agency in the West End of London at 44 Regent Street, Piccadilly Circus. He is most well known for his popularization of the music of Richard Wagner. In 1882, he arranged the first British staging of the epic Ring Cycle, conducted by Anton Seidl and directed by Angelo Neumann. He became a British citizen in 1896.

During his four or more decades of professional activity, Schulz-Curtius organized dozens of concerts at concert and recital venues such as St James's Hall, Queen's Hall, the Royal Opera House in Covent Garden, Wigmore Hall, which was then known as Bechstein Hall, and collaborated with other impresarios as well such as Robert Newman, founder of The Proms.

Alfred Schulz-Curtius had great enthusiasm for the string instruments designed by Dr. Alfred Stelzner and went to great lengths to encourage their use by soloists, ensembles and orchestras.

The conductors with whom Schulz-Curtius worked include Hermann Levi, Felix Mottl, Percy Pitt, Hans Richter, and Henry Joseph Wood. Others among the many artists whom he represented include pianist Ferruccio Busoni, violinist Jan Kubelík, soprano Dame Nellie Melba, and cellist Guilhermina Suggia.

He married Helen Mary Perry in 1908, and they had at least one son, Alfred Siegfried Curtis.

At the beginning of World War I, Lionel Powell was taken on as a partner in the agency (renamed Schulz-Curtius Powell) when Schulz-Curtius, a German national, was interned as an "enemy alien", despite having become a naturalized British subject in 1896, and changing his name by deed poll to Alfred Curtis on 24 September 1914. Powell continued to manage the agency through the 1920s after the death of its founder in Bournemouth, Hampshire, on 4 March 1918. He was 64 years old.

== Legacy ==
From the early 1930s, South African Harold Holt managed the agency as Harold Holt Ltd until his death in 1953. In 1956, Sir Ian Hunter joined the agency and, in 1969, by which time Harolt Holt Ltd was owned by Ibbs and Tillett, purchased it.

In the late 1990s, the agency which Alfred Schulz-Curtius had founded more than 120 years earlier merged with the Lies Askonas agency to form Askonas Holt.
