= Cellone =

Large cello tuned to E A D G

A cellone is a large cello invented in 1882 by the German luthier Alfred Stelzner. It is held like a cello but tuned (high-to-low) to E_{3} A_{2} D_{2} G_{1}, a fourth below the cello and two octaves below the violin. Its music is written in the bass clef. Its body length and its breadth slightly exceeds those of a normal cello, but it sounds much deeper than a normal cello.

It is rarely used by composers. One of the few works where it is used is the Sextet in D major for violino piccolo, violin, viola, violotta, cello, and cellone, Op. 68, by Arnold Krug.

== See also ==
- Tenor violin
- Viola Profonda
- Violin octet

== Discography ==
- 2005: Homage to Stelzner. CD. AK Coburg DR 0010. (Contains music by Felix Draeseke and Arnold Krug)
