= Vattakkali =

Type of dance from Kerala, India

Vattakkali is a dance form practiced among the Vattuvar community in Kerala, India.

In this dance, participants make extremely fast moves while forming vigorous ring patterns in tune with the music or song sung by the group. While both men and women participate in the Kanyarkali Mahotsavam, the dance is performed only by men and occasionally women join and they also do other rituals offering flowers. Twelve different types of 'steps' are executed. The beauty of the intricate footwork is heightened by the tinkling of anklets and bells, and also by the rhythmic clapping of hand. The whirling movements become faster as the dancing reaches a climax. This dance is performed during the Onam festival season very often. The dance is also called Chuvadukali or Chavittukali.

Vattakali is an attractive part of Kanyarkali Maholsavam, where ritualist folk dances are performed in the temples of Palakkad.

== See also ==
- Dance in India
