= Ida Haendel =

Polish/British/Canadian violinist (1928–2020)

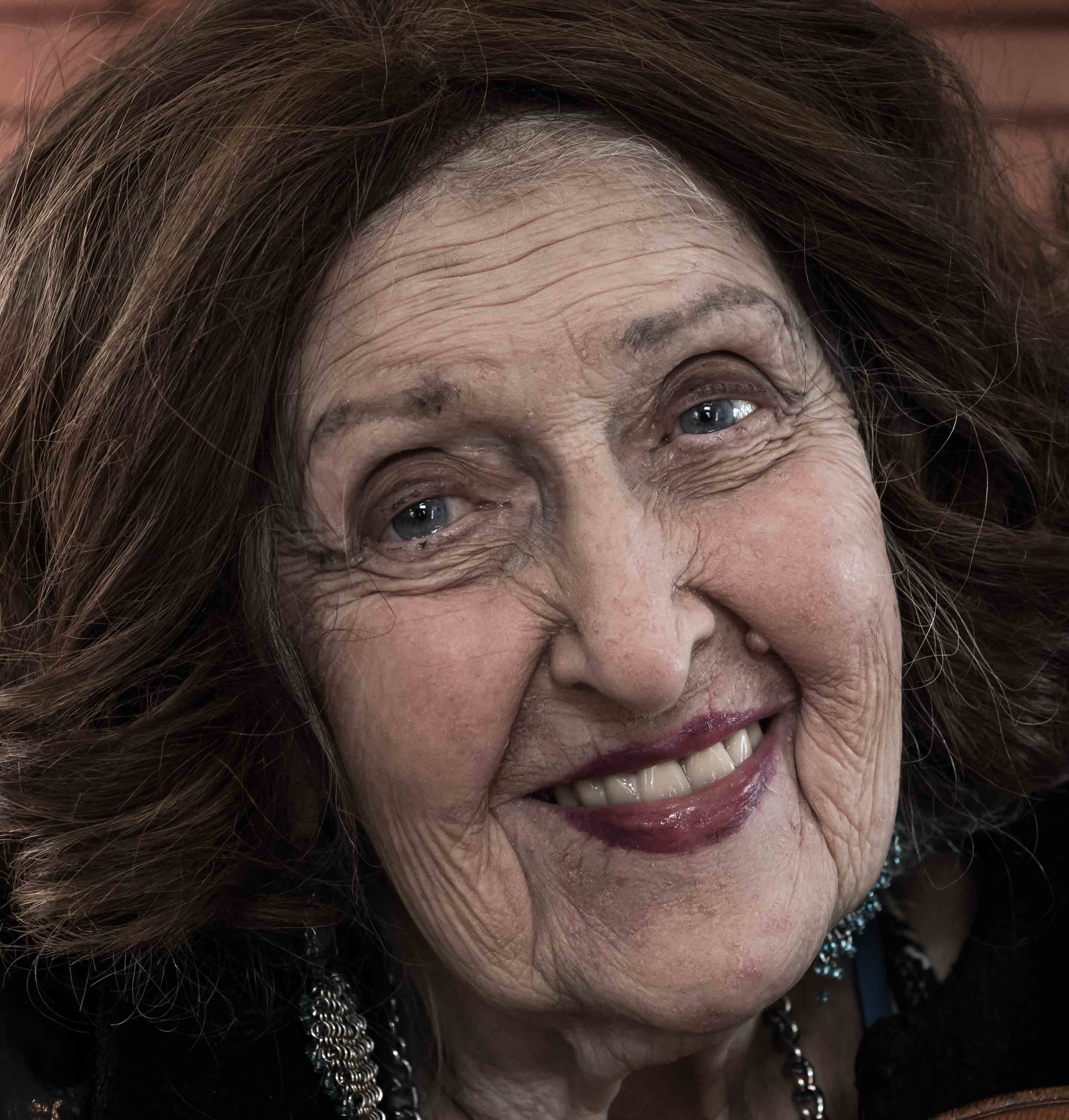
Ida Haendel in 2016

Ida Haendel, CBE (15 December 1928 - 1 July 2020) (Note: The Strad magazine dated March 1937 mistakenly gives her birth date as 15 January 1923; her precise age though is not in doubt as her autobiography states clearly in the opening chapter her birth year. It has been reported that, in consultation with her father, the English impresario Harold Holt adjusted her birth year from 1928 to 1923 to make it appear she was five years older than she really was. This was done in order to circumvent Covent Garden's rule prohibiting anyone aged under 14 appearing on stage. The incorrect birth year of 1923 has since appeared in many reference works.) was a world renowned Polish-British-Canadian violinist. Haendel was a child prodigy, her career spanning over seven decades. She also became an influential teacher.

== Early career ==
Born in 1928 to a Polish Jewish family in Chełm, Poland, her talents were evident when she picked up her sister's violin at the age of three. Major competition wins paved the way for success. Performing the Beethoven Violin Concerto, she won the Warsaw Conservatory's Gold Medal and the first Huberman Prize in 1933, at five years old. At the age of seven she competed against towering virtuosos such as David Oistrakh and Ginette Neveu to become a laureate of the first Henryk Wieniawski Violin Competition, in 1935.

These accolades enabled her to study with the esteemed pedagogues Carl Flesch in London and George Enescu in Paris. During World War II she played in factories and for British and American troops and performed in Myra Hess's National Gallery concerts. In 1937 her London debut under the baton of Sir Henry Wood brought her worldwide critical acclaim, while the conductor linked her playing to his memories of Eugène Ysaÿe. Her lifelong association with the Proms resulted in 68 appearances.

== Performing career ==
After performing the Sibelius concerto in Helsinki in 1949, she received a letter from the composer. "You played it masterfully in every respect," Sibelius wrote, adding: "I congratulate myself that my concerto has found an interpreter of your rare standard." Haendel made annual tours of Europe, and also appeared regularly in South America and Asia.

Living in Montreal, Canada from 1952 to 1989, her collaborations with Canadian orchestras made her a key celebrity of Canadian musical life. As a British subject resident in Canada, she automatically acquired Canadian citizenship. Performing with the London Philharmonic in 1973, she was the first Western soloist invited to China following the Cultural Revolution. Although she worked particularly with Sergiu Celibidache, she was also associated with Sir Thomas Beecham, Sir Adrian Boult, Sir Eugene Goossens, Sir Malcolm Sargent, Charles Munch, Otto Klemperer, Sir Georg Solti, Vladimir Ashkenazy, Bernard Haitink, Rafael Kubelík, Lorin Maazel, Zubin Mehta and Sir Simon Rattle, with whom she recorded the Elgar and Sibelius violin concertos.

Esteemed music critic Tully Potter said of her, "In concertos, she ruled supreme among female players."

In 1993, she made her concert début with the Berliner Philharmoniker. In 2006 she performed for Pope Benedict XVI at the former Nazi concentration camp Auschwitz-Birkenau. Later engagements include a tribute concert at London's National Gallery in honour of Dame Myra Hess's War Memorial Concerts and an appearance at the Sagra Musicale Malatestiana Festival in 2010. Haendel's violin was a Stradivarius of 1699. Haendel lived in Miami, Florida for many years after 1990 and was actively involved in the Miami International Piano Festival.

Haendel performed many concerts and tours with pianist Ronald Turini, a native of Montreal, including sonatas of Brahms and Franck.

== Recordings ==
Haendel's major label recordings have earned critical praise. The Sibelius Society awarded her the Sibelius Medal in 1982. She said she always had a passion for German music. Her recording career began on 10 September 1940 for Decca, initially of short solo pieces and chamber works. In April 1945, she recorded both the Tchaikovsky and Mendelssohn concertos followed in 1947 by the Dvořák concerto. Her recording career spanned nearly 70 years for major labels including EMI and Harmonia Mundi. In 1948–49 she recorded Beethoven's Violin Concerto, with Rafael Kubelik conducting the Philharmonia Orchestra. In 2014, Supraphon issued a 5-CD set of her live and studio recordings made in Prague between 1957 and 1965, including a famous one of Lalo's Symphonie espagnole conducted by Karel Ančerl.

Other acclaimed recordings are her renditions of the Brahms Violin Concerto (including one with the London Symphony Orchestra conducted by Sergiu Celibidache, his last studio recording), and Tchaikovsky's with the National Symphony Orchestra conducted by Basil Cameron. Geoffrey Norris, music critic for The Telegraph, praised her 1993 recording of the Sibelius concerto, later released by Testament Records, as "simply mind-blowing." Among her later recordings were the Sonatas and partitas for solo violin, BWV1001-1006 by J. S. Bach, recorded at Studio 1 Abbey Road, London, in 1995 recorded in analogue and issued by Testament.

She was equally passionate about the music of the 20th century, including Béla Bartók, Benjamin Britten and William Walton. Among her premiere performances were Luigi Dallapiccola's Tartiniana Seconda, and Allan Pettersson's Violin Concerto No. 2, which was dedicated to her. Paying tribute to her teacher George Enescu, her Decca recording of his Violin Sonata with Vladimir Ashkenazy in 2000 earned her a Diapason d'Or.

== Teaching ==
Haendel's emotive performances have inspired a generation of new violinists, including Anne-Sophie Mutter, David Garrett and Maxim Vengerov.

In August 2012 she was honorary artist at the Cambridge International String Festival. She was a regular adjudicator for violin competitions, including the Sibelius, the Carl Flesch, the Benjamin Britten, and the International Violin Competition. She returned to her native Poland to judge the Henryk Wieniawski Violin Competition in Poznań on a number of occasions, and was honorary chairwoman in 2011.

== Death ==
Haendel died at a nursing home in Pembroke Park, Florida on 1 July 2020, aged 91. According to her nephew, she had been suffering from kidney cancer at the time of her death.

== Honours and awards ==
In 1991 she was appointed Commander of the Order of the British Empire (CBE) by Queen Elizabeth II. She received honorary doctorates from the Royal College of Music, London, in 2000 and from McGill University of Montreal in 2006.

== Bibliography ==
Haendel published her autobiography, Woman With Violin, in 1970 (Gollancz; ISBN 978-0-575-00473-3).

Her autobiography excerpt from her book

== Television ==
Her life has been the subject of several television documentaries, including Ida Haendel: A Voyage of Music (1988), I Am The Violin (2004), and Ida Haendel: This Is My Heritage (2011). In June 2009, she appeared on a Channel 4 television programme, The World's Greatest Musical Prodigies, in which she advised the then 16-year-old British composer Alex Prior on which children to choose to play his composition.
