= Harold Holt (impresario) =

British impresario (1885–1953)

Harold Holt (3 November 1885 – 3 September 1953) was an impresario in England from the 1920s to the early 1950s, who managed many of the great names in the classical music world. He was considered the leading concert agent of his time, and was said to be "the greatest raconteur in London, who wasted away his fortune".

== Biography ==
Harold Holt was born in Kimberley, Northern Cape, South Africa on 3 November 1885. His father was a Jewish diamond merchant. He trained as a lawyer, but never practised.

In 1924 he went into partnership with Lionel Powell, who had taken over the firm created by Alfred Schulz-Curtius after the latter's death. (The firm had been founded in 1876 by Schulz-Curtius to promote Richard Wagner's music in England. He later took Lionel Powell into partnership.) Powell died suddenly in 1931, leaving Holt with a mountain of debts and a company to run. It is now known as Askonas Holt.

The list of famous names Harold Holt managed was long. It included: Marian Anderson, Feodor Chaliapin, Ania Dorfmann, Amelita Galli-Curci, Beniamino Gigli, Dame Joan Hammond, Ida Haendel, Josef Hassid, Jascha Heifetz, Vladimir Horowitz, Fritz Kreisler, Dora Labbette, John McCormack, Dame Nellie Melba, the young Yehudi Menuhin (in his concerts with Sir Edward Elgar), Grace Moore, Vladimir de Pachmann, Ignacy Jan Paderewski, Gregor Piatigorsky, Rosa Ponselle, Sergei Rachmaninoff, Paul Robeson, Richard Tauber, and Luisa Tetrazzini.

The legend that he scrubbed Enrico Caruso from his list after he refused an offer of $36,000 for 10 appearances is clearly false, as Caruso's career ended in 1920 and he died in the following year, before Holt was in business.

Josef Hassid was said, while confined in a mental institution, to have drawn up a list of the people he would kill if ever he were freed, and Harold Holt was at the top of the list. Musicians would say, jokingly, that Hassid was not all that mad if he wanted to kill Harold Holt. However, Holt had made strong representations to Hassid's medical advisers that his genius was such that the world could not afford to lose him prematurely, and all must be done to cure him.

In consultation with her father, Harold Holt adjusted Ida Haendel's birth year from 1928 to 1923 to make it appear she was five years older than she really was. This was done in order to circumvent Covent Garden's rule prohibiting anyone aged under 14 appearing on stage. The incorrect birth year of 1923 has since appeared in many reference works.

He began the Celebrity Concerts at the Royal Albert Hall. The creation of the London Philharmonic Orchestra, usually attributed to its first conductor Sir Thomas Beecham, was said to have been largely the initiative of Harold Holt.

In 1947 he was the first President of the European Association of Artist Managers (AEAA).

He died on 3 September 1953, aged 67.
