= All India DanceSport Federation =

Indian sport federation

- Sport: Dancesport
- Jurisdiction: India
- Membership: 18 State Associations
- Abbreviation: AIDSF
- Founded: 2003; 22 years ago
- Affiliation: World DanceSport Federation
- Affiliation date: 20 June 2007
- Regional affiliation: Asian DanceSport Federation
- Headquarters: 135, Acharya Vihar, Bhubaneswar, Odisha
- President: Arvind Kumar
- Vice president(s): Subhrant Singh
- Secretary: Biswajit Mohanty

Official website
- www.indiandancesport.org
- (India)

The All India DanceSport Federation (AIDSF) is the national sports federation for dancesport in India.

The AIDSF was founded in 2003. It is a full member of the World DanceSport Federation, and has been affiliated to the body since 20 June 2007. However, the AIDSF is not recognized by the Indian Olympic Association.

== Organization structure ==
The AIDSF is composed of several State Associations, which are in turn composed of numerous District Associations. Each District Association is made up of registered dance clubs based within that district. Dancers in India can register any of these dance clubs.

The AIDSF is administered by the President, the senior Vice President, two Vice-Presidents, the Secretary General, two Joint Secretaries, the Treasurer, and six Executive Committee Members.

== Competitions ==
There are five levels of dancesport competition sanctioned by the AIDSF. Club Level competitions are conducted by individual clubs and participants include only members of that club. State level competitions are conducted by State Associations and participants include any dancers registered with a club that is registered to District Association within the State Association. In All India Invitational competitions, a State Association invites dancers from any State Association in the country to compete. There is no contestant limit in these competitions, and as such, any number of participants can be invited.

National Level competitions are the highest level domestic dancesport competition. These events are organized annually by the AIDSF, and are hosted by a different State Association every year. Each State Association may send a maximum of two dancers to represent their state at the tournament. These dancers are selected by State Associations based on the results of State Level competitions conducted by each individual State Association. These State Level competitions are generally held around month prior to the National Level tournament.

The AIDSF also organizes selections rounds to pick dancers to represent India at Asian and World Dancesport Championships.
