= Bacha Nagma =

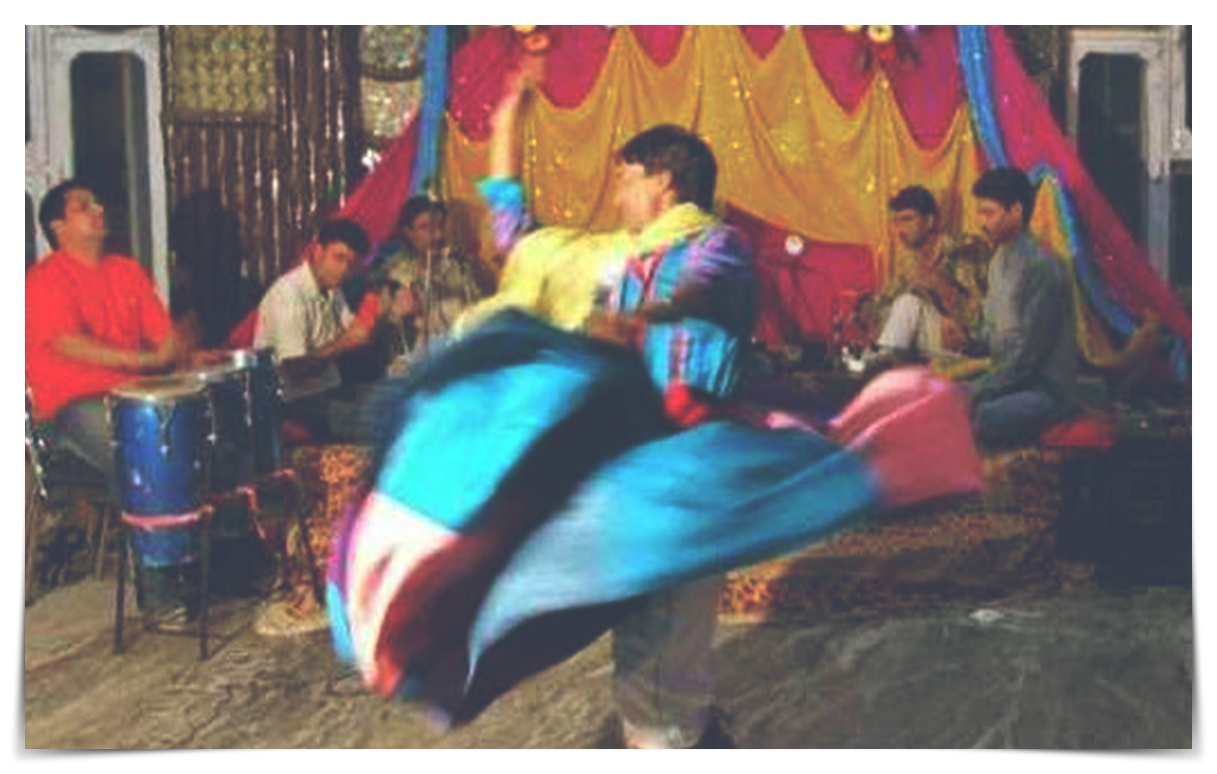
A 'Bacha' performing Bacha Nagma with his fellow dancers

Bacha Nagma is one of the major folk dance forms found in the Kashmir valley. It is also referred to as Bacha Gyavaun in certain parts of Kashmir. Afghans of Kabul are credited with the parentage of this dance. It is a derivative of the Hafiza Nagma. During the Bacha Nagma, a teenaged boy dressed as a girl dancer, who is trained in the Hafiza style of dancing sings Kashmiri Ballad and dances. This dance is popular in the villages, mainly at the harvest time. It is also popular for being performed in social gatherings and parties by young boys who disguise themselves as women in long skirts. Bacha Nagma is common in Kashmir during wedding celebrations and when the wedding processions are taken out on boats on the Jhelum river. This dance form is much appreciated and has the ability to engage large audiences. It is accompanied by instruments like rabab, sarangi, and drums. It involves quick spinning movements just like in the Hafiza dance form and some may even resemble those of kathak. The song-dance proceeding is known as Bach Nagma Jashan - Kid Dancer's Celebration. The dancer is known as The Bacha - the Kid - usually a thin and graceful boy/man who dances, sometimes comically, is always attired like a woman in a multi-colored frock-like dress.

This dance occupies a very special place in the folklore of Kashmir and is performed during parties where people socialize with each other. The dance is also conducted during festivals and religious occasions. The audience is entertained by the rejoicing movements of the performers accompanied by loud music. This folk dance form was one of the most prevalent ways of entertainment in the old days. With the passage of time, there come up in many ways by which people entertain themselves. The Bacha Nagma dance has still existed as a folk dance form and is considered one of the prime components of the Kashmiri culture. Before the Bacha Nagma, another type of celebration was much more popular - Hafiz Nagma, ‘Female dancer’s song’.

== Etymology ==
The term "Bacha Nagma" is derived from two different words, Bacha: From Persian بچه (bačče). Ultimately from Sanskrit वत्स (vatsa, "boy, child, son"), from which Hindi बछड़ा (bachṛā, "calf, child, boy") is derived and Nagma: From Urdu ناجما, Hindi: नघमा meaning a melody or a tune. Combined altogether means the child's dance.

== History ==
The valley of Kashmir is appreciated for its rich culture and the various folk dance forms which can still be seen. Kashmir was predominantly populated by Muslims and has remained aloof from the main cultural currents of India, but the ancient caves and temples of Kashmir reveal a strong link with Indian culture at the beginning of the Common Era. At one time the classical dances of the south are believed to have been practiced. When Islam was introduced in the 14th century, dancing and theatrical arts were suppressed, being contrary to a strict interpretation of the Qurʾān. These arts survived only in folk forms and were performed principally at marriage ceremonies. The history of the Bacha Nagma folk dance form says that the dance evolved many years ago as a dance form that was being performed during the harvest season to celebrate the joy of harvesting. However, it gradually gained popularity among the people and is now being performed at social gatherings, parties, and get-togethers, as well as during religious occasions and festivals.

Another dance form is known as the Hafiz Nagma- ‘Female dancer’s Song’ was prevalent before the Bacha Nagma. Its performance was similar to Bacha Nagma, and the songs were usually set to Sufi lyrics or Sufia Kalam, but the dancer who performed on these songs was always female and known as Hafiza. These dancers were much celebrated at weddings and festivals. This dance form was eventually replaced by the Bacha Nagma, with different reasons given for this happening. A belief among the locals is that the concept of boys dancing in female attire had a historical significance which dates back during the rule of the Mughal emperor Akbar. After Kashmir was captured by Akbar, he wanted to diminish the gallantry of the men residing in the place. To accomplish it, he enforced the men to dress up like the women, to prevent them from disclosing their heroism and bravery. Kashmiris believe that Mughal emperor Akbar, in an attempt to counter manly valor of its people and remove any possible future trouble, decree-forced Kashmiri men to were feminine gown like dresses - pheran. In the 1920s, Hafiz Nagma was banned officially in Kashmir by the ruling Dogra Maharaja. The ruler felt this dance was losing its Sufi touch and was becoming too sensual and hence amoral for the society. With songs being the same, the female Muslim dancers were replaced by young Muslim boys who dressed as women, giving the origin of Bacha Nagma. Few studies by the respected academic personnel reveal that this dance form was mainly promoted by the Afghans in Kabul. The dancers did not only wear the dress of a woman but they also beautified themselves with various ornaments and jewelry. The dance movements are performed with such dignity and expertise that it is almost impossible to distinguish the boys with that of the dance performances of girls. It is a distinct credit of the young boys, dancing and singing simultaneously with the music. These young boys are trained as soon as they reach their adolescent age to maintain the sweetness and the shrillness in their voice. During the modern era, there have been several alterations in the song and the dance.

== Form ==
Bacha Nagma is an offshoot to the Hafiza dance form. It is considered very popular and draws attention of large amount of crowd and applause. It also involves quick spinning movements like those in Kathak. The dancers do much of an expressional dancing to interpret the lyrics of the song being sung. Nowadays marriages in Kashmir are considered incomplete without Bacha Nagma performance. The groups are booked a couple of months before the events. During the ceremony, the ‘Bacha’ gets more people on the dance floor and is then customarily showered with money. The singing takes place all night and the Ghungroos add to the aesthetic nature of the song. There are songs of different patterns, like Erotic, Humorous, Pathetic, Heroic, Spiritual, Peaceful and Wondrous. Many different type of rasas (emotions) are present in these songs sung by the bacha and which are then expressed beautifully through the dancing.

== Performance ==
The dance is usually performed by young performers. Each one of them is skilled and accomplished in their genre of dance. These young boys are made to look like women with local traditional women's attire and make-up. The dancers follow the Hafiza style of dance. They receive adequate and expert training to adopt the Hafiza dance form of Kashmir. A common feature noticed in these young teenagers is that they have the supple body so that they can easily adapt the flexible moves like that of female dancers in Hafiza. Since these boys are of tender age they have sweeter voices and thus, they can sing while dancing. They are trained to retain that voice. The performance consists of six to seven members and there is no particular singer; one of the dancers himself is the lead singer among the dancers that sings in a melodious voice and the other members join him in the chorus. The dresses worn by dancers somewhat resemble those worn by Kathak dancers. Their faces are adorned to represent that of a girl. The dancers move around the dance stage in a poised, simple, and lively nature.

== Music and Instruments ==
The songs are similar to the ones that are sung with the Hafiza dance i.e. songs written in Sufi Kalam or lyrics. Sufi Kalam is a song form, dedicated to the divine power and spirit. Other songs used contain lyrics that resemble the Persian style of literature. Nowadays the lyrics are composed to represent a fun theme or a comedy, to allure the observers. The music is loud and is an inherent part of the dance form. Without the music, the performance does not attain its exquisite charm and sophistication.

A Sufi Kalam performance consists of an ustad, and three musicians (all of the vocalists and instrumentalists) introducing the shakal (alaap) before presenting the baeth (mystic and/or romantic verses) of a maqaam (raga). Sufi Kalam was the music form favored by the elite, while the masses enjoyed traditional forms of folk music like Chhakri, Rof, and Wanwun. Chhakri is folk music sung to the accompaniment of sarang, rabab, tumbaknari and nott. Bacha Nagma is accompanied by the Chhakri singers and instruments and the Sufi kalam slowly faded away. A ballad in Kashmiri was sung for the story is told and not merely as dance-accompaniments. Sometimes for the sake of entertainment, dance was also performed along with the singing of a narrative song which became a local practice for the Bacha Nagma singers.
