= Nagpuri literature =

Nagpuri literature refers to literature in the Nagpuri language, the language of Jharkhand, Chhattisgarh and Odisha. The earliest literature started in the nagpuri language when the Nagvanshi king and king of Ramgarh Raj started writing poetry in the 17th century. Since then, various literature has been written. Although in the present century, Nagpuri was never considered worthy of literary development. But some dedicated writers have engaged in writing short stories, plays and poetry.

== History ==
=== Early modern period ===
According to findings of manuscripts, literary works in the Nagpuri language started in the reign of Nagvanshi and Ramgarh Raj. Only the identity of King Raghunath Shah and King of Ramgarh, Dalel Singh, have established who were king in the 17th century. They were writing poetry. These literature are in Devnagari and Kaithi script.

=== Late modern period ===
Some poets of the late modern period were Hanuman Singh, Jaigovind Mishra, Barju Ram Pathak, Ghasi Ram Mahli, Das Mahli, Mahant Ghasi and Kanchan. There were also great writers like Pradumn Das and Rudra Singh.

- Hanuman Singh and Barju Ram Pathak were poets in 19th century. Hanuman Singh was 40 years older than Barjuram. Barju Ram Pathak was caretaker of Mahamaya temple of Hapamuni village in Gumla district which was constructed by king Gajghat Rai in 9th century. His wife and children were killed by tribal insurgent in Kol rebellion between 1831 and 1833. They also demolished Mayamaya temple. The poetry of Hanuman Singh and Barjuram Pathak reflect Vaishnav and Shivaism tradition such as poetry on Lord Ram, Krishna and Shiva.
- "Nagvanshavali" (1876), genealogy of Nagvanshis of Chotanagpur written by Beniram Mahta is a historical work in nagpuri.
- Ghasi Ram Mahli was a prominent poet who has written "Nagvanashavali", "Durgasaptasati", "Barahamasa", "Vivha Parichhan" etc.
- Drugpal Deogharia wrote Nal Damayanti Charit, Mahaprabhu Basudev Charit.
- Mahlidas wrote Sudama Charit.
- Jaigovind Mishra wrote Lanka Kand.
- Jagnivas Narayan Tiwari wrote Ras Tarangini which is unpublished which contain 600 songs.
- Dhaniram Bakshi was singer and writer. He published his books as well as several other writers and helped in preservation many works from going extinct.
- The writing of prose in nagpuri language was started by Christian missionaries. Missionary Peter Shanti Naurangi was prominent among them.
- E.H.Whitley wrote Notes on the Ganwari dialect of Lohardaga, Chhota Nagpur in 1896, which is considered the start of writing prose in nagpuri language.

=== Contemporary period ===
Some writer in contemporary period are Praful Kumar Rai, Sahani Upendra Pal Singh, Shiv Avtar Choudhary, Lal Ranvijay Nath Shahdeo, Bisheshwar Prasad Keshari, Girdhari Ram Gonjhu, Bhuneshwar Anuj and Shakuntala Mishra.

- Baldev Prasad Sahu written Lav Kush Charit poetry.

Nagpuri taught in Ranchi University and other Universities of Jharkhand since 1980s. The study in regional and tribal languages in Ranchi University was started by Bishweswar Pradesh Keshri and Ram Dayal Munda during 1980s. Although Nagpuri was never considered worthy of literatary development, in present time a small but dedicated writers have engaged in writing short stories, plays and poetry.

== Author and work ==
There are around 645 known nagpuri poets and writers whose manuscripts and books have been available since the 17th century. Works of some poets and writers in the nagpuri language are as follows:

Author	Works
Raghunath Shah	first known poet in nagpuri language, mostly composed devotional poetry
Beniram Mehta	Nagvanshavali (1876)
Ghasi Ram Mahli	Nagpuri Fag Satak, Lalana Ranjana, Durga Saptasati, Nagvanshavali Jhumar
Kanchan	Sudama Charitra, Krishna Charitra, Mahabharat, Lanka Kand, Usha Haran
Drugpal Ram Deogharia	Nal Charita, Korambe Upakhyan
E.H Whitley	Notes on Ganwari dialects of Lohardaga, Chotanagpur (grammar), 1896
Konrad Bookout	Grammar of the Nagpuria Sadani language
Ramtahal Ram	Geet Nagpuria Jhumar (1945)
Dhaniram Bakshi	Jitiya Kahani, Fogli budhia kar Kahani, Narad Moh Lila, Karam Mahatmay, Sri Krishna Charit, Domkach geet (1957)
Baraik Mahadev Singh	Desi Jhumar
Praful Kumar Rai	Son Jhair (collection of stories), Barkha, Barkha Bund, Nagpuri Kavi, Awsar ni mile bujhu, Kilkila
Bisheshwar Prasad Keshari	Nerua Lota urf Sanskritit Abdharna (nibandh), Thakur Vishwanath Sahi, Kanti
Bhuneshwar Anuj	Nagpuri Lok Sahitya
Sahani Upendra Pal Singh	Mewar Keshri, Amba Manjar, Ulahana
Shravan Kumar Goswami	Nagpuri Vyakran, Seva aur Nokri, Teteir Kar Chhaon, Du Dair Bis Phool
Girdhari Ram Gonjhu	Mahabali Radhe Kar Balidan, Akhra Nindaye Gelak
Naimuddin Mirdaha	Menjur Painkh
Baraik Iswari Prasad Singh	Kaka kar Kahani
Kali Kumar Suman	Khukhri Rugda
Shakuntala Mishra	Nagpuri Sadani Vyakaran, Sadani Nagpuri-Hindi Sabdkosh, Sato Nadi Par
