= Sadan peoples =

Indo-Aryan Ethno-linguistic groups of Jharkhand

Regions with significant populations
- Chota Nagpur Plateau (Jharkhand, Chhattisgarh, Odisha, West Bengal and Bihar)

Languages
- Hindi; Nagpuri; Khortha; Kudmali/Kurmali

Religion
- Predominantly: Hinduism; Ethnic religion; Folk religion; Minorities: Christianity; Buddhism; Islam

Related ethnic groups
- Indo-Aryan peoples

The Sadan people are the native Indo-Aryan-speaking ethnolinguistic groups of the Chota Nagpur Plateau, mainly within the Indian state of Jharkhand and neighboring states, who speak Nagpuri, Khortha, and Kurmali as their first languages.

== Definition ==
Sadan refers to Indo-Aryan speaking ethnic groups of Jharkhand who speak Nagpuri, Khortha, and Panchpargania. In the Nagpuri language, Sadan refers to settled people or those people who live in houses. Sadan are those who have settled in the region. According to Bisheshwar Prasad Keshari, the original form of these languages must have developed within different Nagjati. According to Ram Dayal Munda and S Bosu Mullick, the category Sadan was used in the estate of Nagvanshi kings of Chotanagpur. The Sadan people settled in Chotanagpur much before the British Period.

During the British Period, Colonel Edward Tuite Dalton referred to Sadan as Sudh or Sad or Sudhan in his work Descriptive Ethnology of Bengal in 1872. During the British Period, the Sudh and Sudhan included all castes, such as Brahmin, Rajput, Gowala, Kurmi, Kahar, Kyastha etc. The word Sudh means pure. During British Period, local Hindus were referred to as Sudh or Sudhan in Chotanagpur.

== History ==
The Chota Nagpur Plateau region has been inhabited since the Neolithic period. Several stone tools and microliths from the Mesolithic and Neolithic periods were discovered in this region. There are ancient cave paintings in Isko, Hazaribagh district, from the Meso-chalcolithic period (9,000-5,000 BC).

It is believed that Sadan people arrived in Chotanagpur sometime after Aryan came to South Asia. During 2nd millennium BCE the use of Copper tools spread in Chota Nagpur Plateau and these find complex are known as the Copper Hoard Culture. There are many Copper tools have discovered in Chota Nagpur plateau. According to many historians Copper hoard people were early Aryan, who came to South Asia before Vedic Aryan. Copper hoard people reached Chota Nagpur around early 2nd millennium BCE. In the Kabra-Kala mound at the confluence of the Son and North Koel rivers in Palamu district, various antiquities and art objects from the Neolithic to medieval periods have been found; the pot-sherds of redware, black and red ware, black ware, black slipped ware, and NBP ware are from the Chalcolithic to late medieval periods. Iron slag, microliths, and potsherds from 1400 BCE, according to carbon dating, were discovered in Singhbhum district.

During the late Vedic period, several janapadas emerged in northern India. Several Nishada kingdoms probably existed in Jharkhand during that time. In the 6th century BCE, the mahajanapadas emerged in several parts of the Indian subcontinent. Some parts of present-day Jharkhand were parts of the Magadha and Anga mahajanapadas. In the Mauryan period, this region was ruled by a number of states, collectively known as the Atavika (forest) states. These states accepted the suzerainty of the Maurya Empire during Ashoka's reign (c. 232 BCE). During the medieval period, the Nagvanshi, Ramgarh Raj, and Chero dynasties were ruling this region. The Mughal influence reached this area during the reign of Emperor Akbar when it was invaded by Raja Mansingh in 1574. There was several invasion during Mughal rule. Influence of the British East India Company reached this region in the 18th century. Raghunath Mahato led a revolt against the East India company in the Jungle Mahals in 1769. Thakur Vishwanath Shahdeo and Pandey Ganpat Rai led rebels against the East India company in the 1857 Rebellion. Tikait Umrao Singh, Sheikh Bhikhari, Nadir Ali, Jai Mangal Singh played pivotal role in Indian Rebellion of 1857.

After independence this region became parts of Bihar state. Separate state Jharkhand was initially a tribal demand which was led by Christian tribal leaders. But the movement failed as tribal were in minority. In 1955, prominent tribal leader Jaipal Singh Munda submitted a memorandum to States Reorganization Commission for a separate Jharkhand state comprising the tribal area of South Bihar, but it was rejected because there were many languages, no link language in the region, Hindustani was majority language, tribal were in minority. In 1970s non-tribal Sadan also joined the separate state movement which strengthen the movement which resulted in formation of new state Jharkhand.Lal Pingley Nath Shahdeo, Lal Ranvijay Nath Shahdeo have prominent role in formation of separate state Jharkhand. In November 2000, the new state of Jharkhand separated from Bihar, comprising Chota Nagpur Division and Santhal Pargana Division.

According to President of Sadan organization Moolvasi Sadan Morcha Rajendra Prasad, the state of Jharkhand was formed for development of Jharkhandi but vision to form Jharkhand have deviated. The Sadan people have no reservations. The Sadan people are marginalized in their own state and government of Jharkhand has decepted Sadan.

== Castes and communities ==
Various Sadan community and Castes are Ahir/Gowala, Bhogta, Bhuiya, Baraik, Dom, Ghasi, Jhora, Kewat, Rautia, Brahmin, Bhumihar, Nagvanshi, Dhanuk, Paika, Dhobi/Baghwar, Karmali, Koeri, Kumhar, Kurmi, Sonar, Mali, Chamar, Lohra, Mahli, Tanti, Teli, Rajput and Bania etc. among others.

== Culture ==
=== Language ===
Sadan people traditionally speak Nagpuri, Khortha, Panchpargania and Kurmali language as their native language which are classified as Bihari languages. Recent study suggest that Indo-Aryan languages of Chota Nagpur plateau known as Sadani languages are closely related to each other than any other languages. Nagpuri is spoken as a link language. After formation of Jharkhand, there was an attempt to develop a common local language for official use and replace Hindi but the attempt failed.

A Sadri (Nagpuri) bidaai song sung at a Sadan wedding

A Sadri song sung at the first meeting of prospective marriage partners

=== Festival ===
Some important festivals of Sadan are, Ashadhi Puja, Karam, Jitiya, Nawakhani, Sohrai/Diwali, Surjahi Puja, Makar Sankranti, Fagua and Sarhul.

=== Folk dance ===
Jhumair is a common folk dance of Sadan. Paiki is Nagpuri martial folk dance. Chhau is another folk dance prevalent in the Kurmali-speaking region. Akhara is a village ground where people dance.

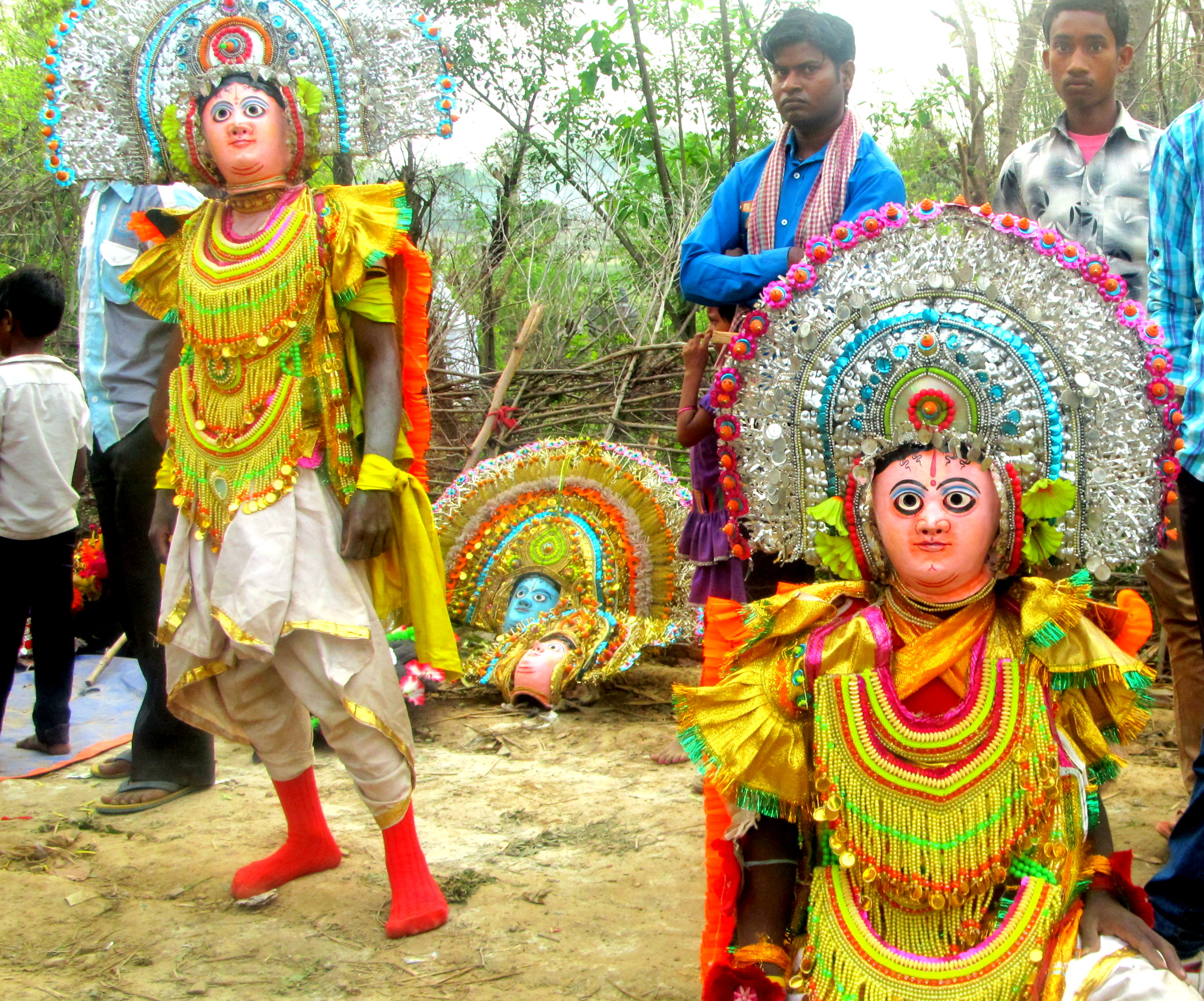
Chhau Dancers in Jharkhand village

=== Religion ===
Sadan people worship Suraj (Sun), Chand (Moon), Gramadevata, Karam Devta (Tree spirit) in various festival which is usually performed by head of family in home and village priest in village known as "Pahan". Gram than or Sarna is place of worship of village deity. Village priest Pahan perform sacrifice for good harvest in sarna. Sadan people follow folk Hinduism which is different from vedic religion and is non-vedic culture prevalent since Chalcolithic period. Many people in the colonial period adopted Christianity after the arrival of missionaries.

=== Clothing ===
Traditional dresses of Sadan are Dhoti, Sari, gamchha, Kurta, Chadar etc. In modern times they also wear Western clothes.

=== Livelihoods ===
Traditionally most Sadan are farmers. Some Sadan community traditionally do works to make items of daily uses such as Pottery, weaving clothes, Iron smeltings, bamboo works etc. Additionally they were practicing hunting animals during old days.

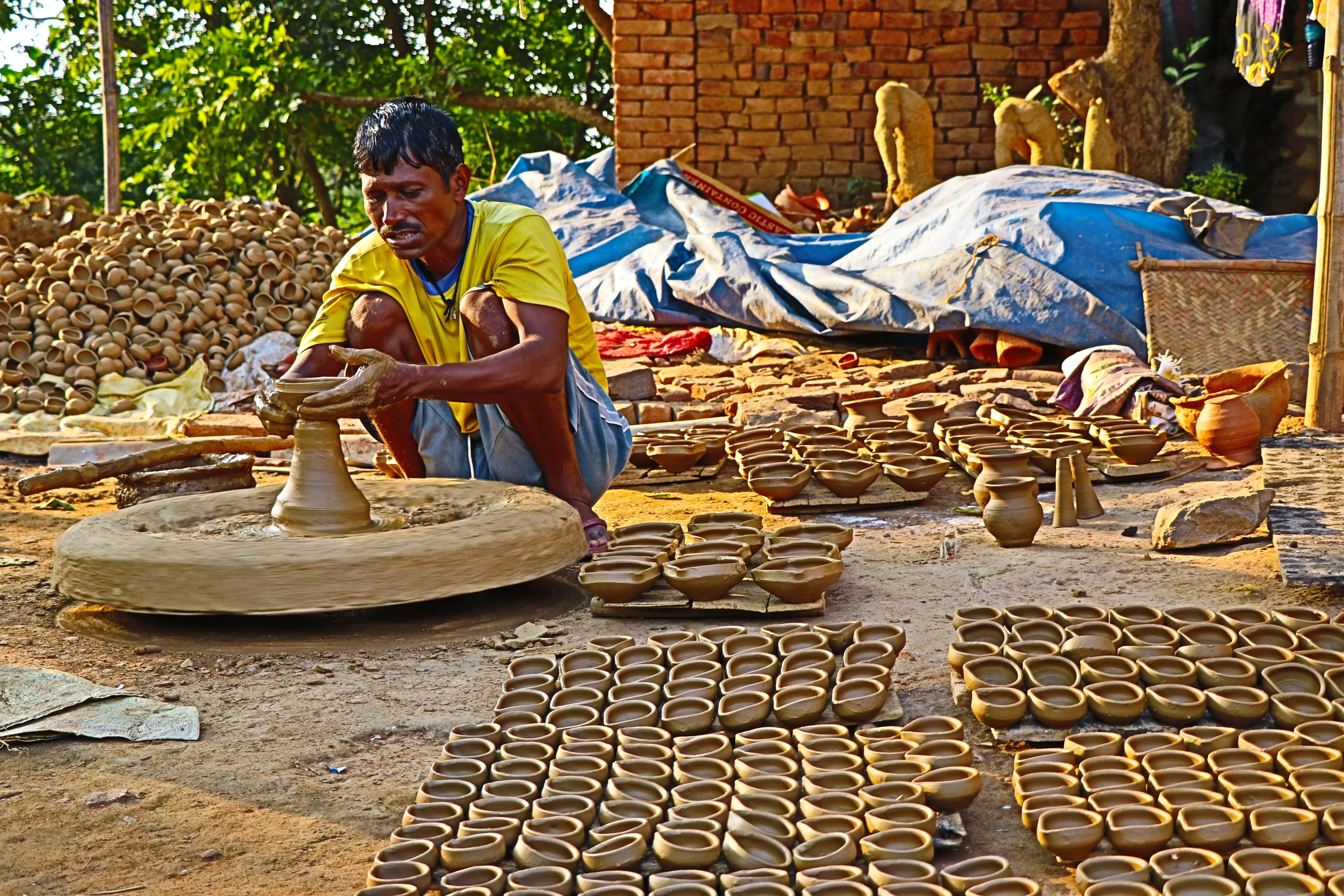
A Potter making diya in Chaibasa, Jharkhand

== Notable people ==
- Satyanand Bhogta, Minister for labour
- Girdhari Ram Gonjhu, scholar
- Deepika Kumari, International Archer
- Deepak Lohar, Actor
- Mahavir Nayak, Folk Singer
- Mukund Nayak, Folk Artist
- Amba Prasad, politician
- Nikki Pradhan, Hockey Player
- Aditya Sahu, MP of Rajya sabha
- Dhiraj Prasad Sahu, Politician
- Shiv Prasad Sahu, Politician
- Bakhtar Say, Freedom fighter
- Durjan Shah, Nagvanshi King
- Raghunath Shah, Nagvanshi King
- Ani Nath Shahdeo, King of Barkagarh
- Lal Chintamani Sharan Nath Shahdeo, Last Nagvanshi king
- Lal Pingley Nath Shahdeo, Jurist
- Lal Ranvijay Nath Shahdeo, Lawyer, Writer and Political activist
- Vishwanath Shahdeo, Freedom fighter
- Basant Narain Singh, Politician
- Dalel Singh, King of Karnpura
- Kamakhya Narain Singh, King of Ramgarh
- Madhu Singh, Nagvanshi king
- Mundal Singh, Freedom fighter
- Tikait Umrao Singh, Freedom fighter
