= Shakuntala Mishra =

Indian writer

- Born: Gumla district, Bihar (now Jharkhand)
- Citizenship: India
- Education: M.A in Nagpuri, Ph.d
- Occupations: Professor, Writer
- Relatives: Jageshwar Mishra (father); Pradumnath Pathak (maternal great-grandfather)
- Writing career
- Language: Nagpuri
- Notable works: Nagpuri Sadani Vyakaran; Sadani Nagpuri-Hindi Sabdkosh; Sato Nadi Par
- Notable awards: Jharkhand Ratna; Praful Samman (2022); Prernasrot Samman (Doordarshan); Katha Samman (Govt. of Jharkhand); Bidushi Samman (Govt. of Bihar)

Shakuntala Mishra is an Indian writer. She is a prominent writer in Nagpuri language. She has written many books in Nagpuri including Nagpuri Sadani Vyakaran a grammar book of Nagpuri, Sadani Nagpuri-Hindi Sabdkosh a dictionary of Nagpuri, Sato Nadi Par a story. Her books are included in university Nagpuri studies. She has been awarded Jharkhand Ratna, Praful Samman, Prernasrot Samman by Doordarshan Ranchi, Katha Samman by Government of Jharkhand, Bidushi Samman by Government of Bihar.

== Life ==
=== Early life ===
She was born in Gumla district of Bihar (Now Jharkhand) into a Brahmin family. Her mother tongue was Nagpuri. Her grandmother used to tell her various stories. She started writing the stories as a child. Then Jai Jharkhand Magazine was published by Dr. Bisheshwar Prasad Keshari from Daltonganj. Her writing was published in the magazine. She wrote her first poem Nehak Doir and it was aired in Aakashvani in 1982. Then she wrote Sukhu Kahani which was based on witchcraft and it was published in Magazine Pajhra which was edited by Girdhari Ram Gonjhu. At that time only Master of Arts course was available in Nagpuri. Despite opposition from her family members, she studied Nagpuri in M.A. She wanted to do something for her language. When she was in M.A final, her written Sukhu Kahani was included in course. Then her work Pardesi Beta was published during her studies.

=== Career ===
She worked in Baldev Sahu Mahavidyalaya in Lohardaga for five years. Her maternal great-grandfather Pradumnath Pathak was a Nagpuri poet. His poetry was a subject of discussion in the family. His father Jageshwar Mishra encouraged her in writing. Then she started work in Nagpuri. She prepared a Nagpuri-Hindi dictionary. Then she wrote Nagpuri Vyakran, the grammar. Her published story Sato Nadi Par was included in the Nagpuri Bachelor of Arts course. When she was student, no books were available in Nagpuri. The study of Nagpuri was conducted with manuscripts. She told Balu Kherwar who was raised in her house to collect manuscripts of different poets and writers. She published books by collecting manuscripts. In 2007, a shop was opened by name of Jharkhand Jharokha and selling of books started under the name of Jharkhand Jharokha publication. The publication published more than 100 books. The shop is notable for books in regional and tribal languages of Jharkhand.

=== Works ===
Some of her prominent works are as follows.

- Nehak Doir
- Sukhu Kahani
- Nagpuri Sadani Vyakaran
- Sadani Nagpuri-Hindi Sabdkosh
- Sato Nadi Par

== Awards ==
She has been awarded Jharkhand Ratna, Prernasrot Samman by Doordarshan Ranchi, Katha Samman by Govt. of Jharkhand, Bidushi Samman by Govt. of Bihar. In 2022, She was awarded Praful Samman by Nagpuri Bhasha Parishad which is given for excellent works in Nagpuri language. she is an advocate for disability rights and inclusive education
