= Sahani =

Sahani may refer to:

- Sahni or Sahani, an Indian surname (including a list of people with that surname)
- Sahani Upendra Pal Singh (1930–2021), an Indian Nagpuri-language writer
- Mdé-Sahani, a town in Grande Comore, Comoros
