= Shravan Kumar Goswami =

Indian scholar and writer (1938–2020)

- Born: 19 January 1938; Ranchi, Bihar (now Jharkhand)
- Died: 11 April 2020 (aged 82); Ranchi
- Citizenship: India
- Education: Bihar University; Ranchi University (M.A., Ph.D.)
- Occupations: Professor, writer, scholar
- Children: Bhuban Bhaskar
- Writing career
- Language: Hindi; Nagpuri
- Period: 1962–1996
- Notable works: Jangal Tantram; Chakravihyu; Nagpuri Vyakran
- Notable awards: Radhakrishna Award

Shravan Kumar Goswami was a writer and scholar of Hindi and Nagpuri language. He was professor of Hindi at Ranchi University. He was given the Radhakrishna Award for his Hindi novel Jangal Tantram.

== Life ==
=== Early life ===
He was born on 19 January 1938 in Ranchi. He completed graduation from Bihar University in 1958. He completed Master of Arts from Ranchi University in 1961.

=== Career ===
He was Lower Divisional clerk in Heavy Engineering Corporation. He started his teaching career at Doranda College in Ranchi in 1962. He completed his Ph.D. in Ranchi University by publishing Nagpuri aur uska shist Sahitya in 1970. He was the first person to do research on Nagpuri literature and get Ph.D. He wanted to establish career in nagpuri but he didn't given much important so started teaching Hindi. After Doronda College, he started teaching Hindi in Ranchi University from 1985. He had written many books including Jangal Tantram, Chakravihyu, Mere Marne Ke Bad, Bharat banam India, Hastkhep Kendra aur Paridhi, Ek tukda Sach, Setu, Rahu Ketu, Darpan Jhut Na Bole, Kahani ek Netaji ki wa Pariksha etc. For Jangal Tantram he received Radhakrishna Award. His written Nagpuri grammar book Nagpuri Vyakran taught in Ranchi University. He was writer of Nagpuri drama Teteir kar Chhaon which was broadcast on All India Radio Ranchi from July to December 1958.

He wrote Ek chhoti si nagri ki lambi kahani, the history of Ranchi in a serial. He also wrote book about Atal Bihari Vajpayee. In 1992, he translated drama of Abhigyan Sakuntalam in nagpuri in workshop of National School of Drama in Netarhat. Mukund Nayak was given responsibility to give tune of nagpuri. He edited Camille Bulcke Smriti Granth and Ramcharit Manas in Mundari language. He retired in 1996 from teaching.

=== Last days and Death ===
He was attended a program in Daltonganj. Then he felt I'll and came to Ranchi. He lost his memory. After taking precautions he recovered but he was ill. He died on 11 April 2020 in Ranchi.

== Award and recognition ==
He was awarded Radhakrishna Award for his first Hindi novel Jangal Tantram.
