= Kurmali language =

Indo-Aryan language spoken in eastern India

Kurmali
- কুড়মালি / কুর্মালী कुड़मालि / कुरमालि କୁଡ଼ମାଲି
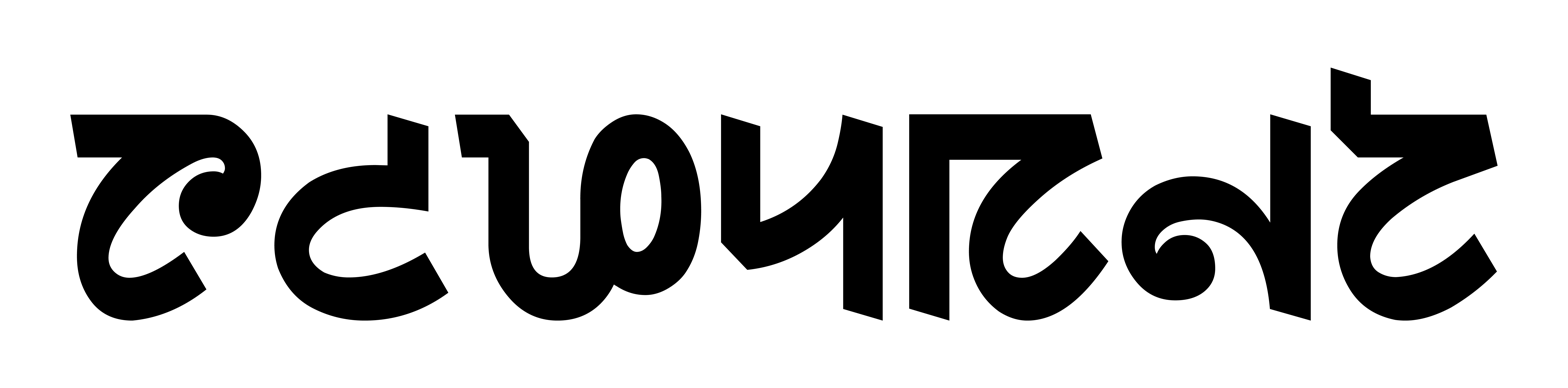
- ' Kuṛmāli ' written in Chisoi script
- Native to: India
- Native speakers: 555,695 (2011 census) (Note: The census results conflate as the language has no standardised form, so the different dialects are grouped with the regional dominant languages. Additionally, many Kurmali (Kudmali) speaker were wrongly recorded as Kudubi/Kudumbi, a Konkani language variety and Karmali, a Santali language variety in the census due to the phonetic similarity of the names. Apart from this, Kurmali language is returned as mother tongue mainly by the Kudmi people. Many other communities who use Kurmali language as their mother tongue, tend to return their own community name as their response to the language question, instead of responding Kurmali. Similarly, while many Kudmi people identify themselves as Kurmali speakers due to community identity, linguistically, they have shifted to the Bengali language.); 619,689 (2001 census)
- Language family: Indo-European: Indo-Iranian; Indo-Aryan; Eastern; Bihari; Sadanic; Kurmali
- Writing system: Chisoi (native); Devanagari; Bengali; Odia

Official status
- Official language in: India: Jharkhand (additional); West Bengal (additional)

Language codes
- ISO 639-3: Either: kyw – Kudmali tdb
- Glottolog: kudm1238 Kudmali
- Distribution of Kurmali language in India

Kurmali or Kudmali (ISO: Kuṛmāli) is an Indo-Aryan language classified as belonging to the Bihari group of languages spoken in eastern India. As a trade dialect, it covers in Jharkhand. Kurmali language is spoken by around 550,000 people mainly in fringe regions of Jharkhand, Odisha and West Bengal. There is also a sizeable population speaking Kurmali in the Assam tea valleys. Kurmali is one of the demanded languages for enlisting in Eighth Schedule to the Constitution of India.

== Geographical distribution ==
Kurmali language is mainly spoken in three eastern states of India, that is, in southeastern district Seraikela Kharswan, East Singhbhum, West Singhbhum, Bokaro , Dhanbad, Godda, Ramgarh, Giridih, Sahebganj, Hazaribagh and Ranchi districts of Jharkhand; in northern district Mayurbhanj, Balasore, Kendujhar, Jajpur and Sundargarh of Odisha; and in south western district Paschim Medinipur, Jhargram, Bankura, Purulia and northern districts Maldah, Uttar Dinajpur, Dakhin Dinajpur, Jalpaiguri of West Bengal. Apart from the core area of the language, the language is also spoken in Udalguri and a few speakers are also found in Cachar, Santipur, Nagaon of Assam; the eastern districts of Chandrapur and Gadchiroli in Maharashtra. Apart from this, a few speakers are also found in the states of Uttar Pradesh, Bihar and in neighbour country Bangladesh and Nepal.

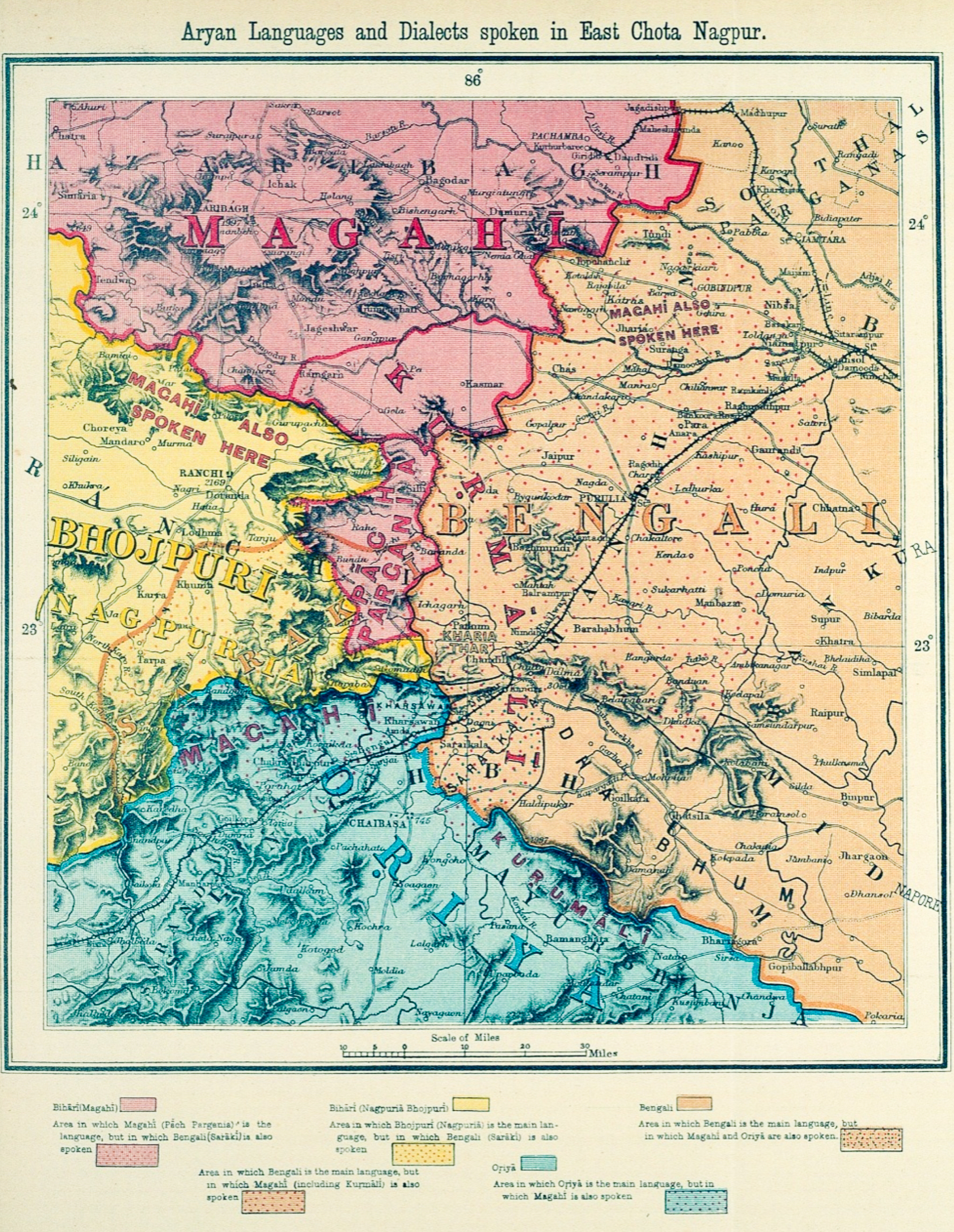
Grierson's linguistic map of East Chota Nagpur, 1903

During the British Raj, the Kurmali language was known as Panchpargania (means "language of five regions") for present-day Bundu, Barenda, Sonahatu (split into Sonahatu and Rahe), Silli, Tamar blocks of Ranchi district of Jharkhand state as a trade language between four linguistic region.

Distribution of Kurmali language in the state of India
1. Jharkhand (43.9%)
2. West Bengal (39.3%)
3. Odisha (16.2%)
4. Other (0.60%)

As per the Census of 2011, there are 311,175 Kurmali Thar speakers in India (hailing mostly from West Bengal, Odisha, Assam and Maharashtra) and 244,914 Panch Pargania speakers (mostly from Jharkhand), making a total of 556,089 Kurmali speakers in India. They are grouped under the umbrella of "Hindi languages". Note that both, Kurmali Thar and Panch Pargania are dialects of the Kurmali language. In Nepal, there are 227 Kurmali speakers. However, it is claimed that the actual number of Kurmali speakers is far higher than the number cited in the census.

== Language variation ==
Historical speaker of Kurmali language variety
Census	Kurmali Thar	Panch Pargania	Total
1951	6,348	–	6,348
1961	1,068	57,947	59,015
1971	21,328	160,947	181,413
1981	–	–	–
1991	236,854	151,599	388,455
2001	425,920	193,769	619,689
2011	311,178	244,914	556,089
Source: Census of India (Note: Inconsistency in the number of speakers in the initial census of independent India is attributed to shifts in language identification, leading to classification challenges in the cross-border transitional languages. However, both the returned varieties, Kurmali Thar and Panch Pargania, are grouped as broader varieties of the Hindi language and the statistical increase in subsequent censuses is primarily due to sociopolitical aspirations. In the colonial census, Kurmali Thar and Panch Pargania were not tabulated as distinct languages, except in certain areas.)

The speakers of Kurmali are spread over a vast region of East India, especially in fringe areas of West Bengal, Jharkhand and Odisha. These states are mostly dominated by Bengali, Nagpuri and Odia speakers. Local dialectal change and language shift can be noticed in these areas. The Kurmi of West Bengal identify themselves as speakers of Kurmali, considering it part of their ethnic identity. But due to age-long settlement in the Bengali region their language is shifting towards the Manbhumi dialect of Bengali, as similarly occurred in northern Odisha with Bengali and Odia admixture. In the 1903 Linguistic survey of India, the shift was explained this way:

There are ... emigrants from ... highlands into the Bengali-speaking area. These have retained their own language, though ... borrowing words and grammatical forms from those amongst whom they live. The result is a kind of mixed dialect essentially Bihārī in its nature, but with a curious Bengali colouring. [...] In each case this dialect is the language of a strange people in a strange land. ... In Manbhum this [Kuṛmalī] language is principally spoken by people of the Kuṛmī caste, who are numerous in the districts of Chota Nagpur, and in the Orissa Tributary state of Mayurbhanja. ... [They] do not all speak corrupted Bihārī. Many of them speak Bengali and Oriya. ... In the Orissa Tributary States, the Kuṛmī nearly all talk Bengali, although living in an Oriya speaking country.

— G. A. Grierson (1903). Linguistic survey of India, Vol. V, Part II, pp. 145–146

Similarly, in the 1911 census, according to the Linguistic Survey of India and Deputy Commissioner of Ranchi the Panchpargania was noted as:

[Panch Pargania] closely resembles the Kurmali Thar of Manbhum. The principal apparent difference is the result of the characters employed in writing. In Manbhum the character adopted is the Bengali, and the language looked at, so to speak, through Bengali spectacles. Hence words are spelled as a Bengali would spell them. In the five Parganas, on the other hand, the Kaithi alphabet is used, and the language is looked at through Hindi spectacles. ... Panch Pargania or Tamaria is really a composition of language formed of Bengali, Oriya and Bihari words and terminations.

— Census of India : 1911, Vol. V, Part I, p. 389

The Kurmali language was initially recorded, notably by G.A. Grierson in the early 20th century, as the language of the Kuṛmi community, who were in a transitional phase to Bengali after settling in Bengali-speaking regions, bordering Hindi and Odia-speaking areas. Thus, it was commonly regarded as a variety of Bengali in the region, but Grierson (1903) classified Kurmali Thar (Thar means "style", i.e., the style of Kuṛmi vocabulary) and Panch Pargania within the Bihari group of languages as Eastern Magahi, based on its distinct structural features and vocabulary, which were shaped by substratal language, diverging from Bengali. On the basis of this categorization, Kurmali Thar and Panch Pargania was officially classified as a variety of Hindi (or Hindustani) in the 1911 census, a classification that continued in subsequent censuses. However, while the speaker remained in a transitional phase, Kurmali gained increasing recognition as a separate linguistic identity after the 1961 census, largely driven by growing sociopolitical consciousness among its speakers.

The Kurmali language bears between 61 and 86 per cent lexical similarity with Panchpargania; 58–72 per cent with Khortha; 51–73 per cent with Nagpuri (Sadri); 46–53 per cent with Odia; 41–55 per cent with Bengali; and 44–58 per cent with Hindi. Hence the Panchpargania is usually considered a major variety of the Kurmali language, although sometimes it is classified as a distinct language. Similarly, due to the great influence of the Bengali language on Kurmali (as the speakers of this language are in the process of shifting to dominant or prestige languages of the region), many linguists label it as Jharkhandi Bangla and sometimes it is clustered as a Manbhumi dialect. Kurmali also closely resembles the Khortha language and has a good number of loanwords from the Munda language family, specifically from the Santali language, although not as much as Khortha language.

It is believed that the early form of the Kurmali language was spoken by Kudmi Mahato, a group that was one of the original homesteaders of erstwhile Manbhum region of Bihar. Although the language is now Indo-Aryan in nature, it has some distinctive features like lexical items, grammatical markers and categories that are neither available in Indo-Aryan nor Dravidian, nor even in Munda languages. The language has its own traditional precedence, and Magahi is not generally regarded as its linguistic source by some authors. Thus it is believed that the language was once a separate, unrelated language. However, because of its long settlement in the Aryan belt, the native speakers gradually abandoned the original structure and switched to an Aryan form of the language, while retaining the substrate of the old. The language currently falls in 6b (threatened) and 7 (language shifting) level of the Expanded Graded Intergenerational Disruption Scale (EGIDS), which correspond to the UNESCO language endangerment category level "Vulnerable" and "Definitely Endangered". However, Ethnologue place Kurmali at 6a (vigorous) level and its variety Panchpargania (widely used in Jharkhand) at level 3 (trade) of EGIDS, both of which correspond to "Safe" status of UNESCO language endangerment category level.

=== Variety ===
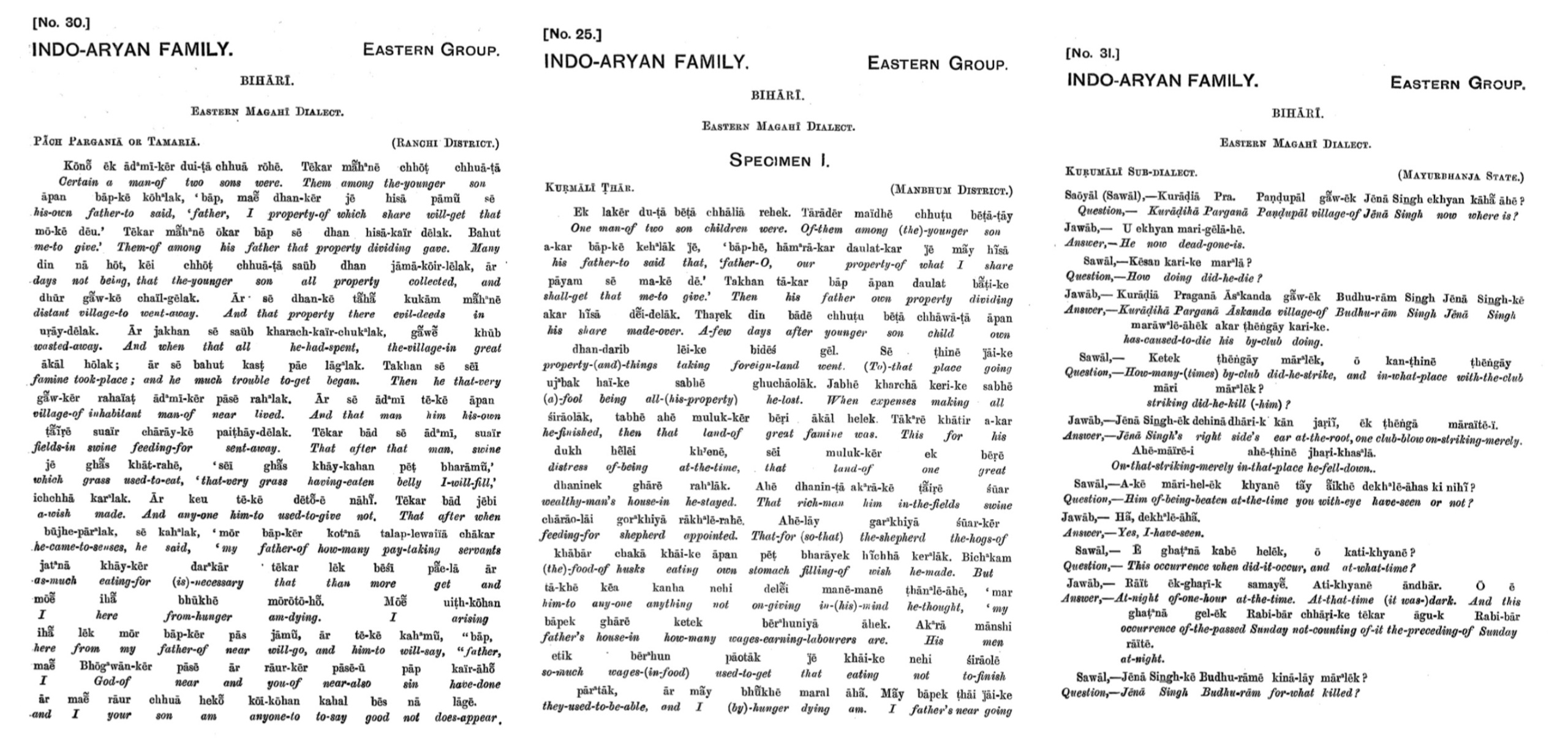
Three Kurmali language specimens recorded in 1903

The language is transferred orally from generation to generation and the Kurmali language remains unstandardised due to influence of other Indo Aryan languages. Thus its speakers use different varieties and accents. However, the language can be classified on the basis of the speakers' territorial region, viz., Singhbhum Kudmali, Dhalbhum Kudmali, Ranchi Kudmali (Panchpargania), Manbhum Kudmali, Mayurbhanj Kudmali are the major regional varieties. All those varieties bear between 58 and 89 per cent lexical similarity with each other.

Present regional varieties of language
English	Dhalbhum Kudmali (Jharkhand)	Manbhum Kudmali (West Bengal)	Mayurbhanj Kudmali (Odisha)
He likes it.	Oẽ iTa pOsOnd kOrOt.	Oẽ iTa pOsOnd kOrEi.	U iTa pOsOnd kare.
One person is sitting.	ek lOke bOise ahe.	ek lok gObchOlahe.	ek lok bOsinchhe.
Invite all of them.	Okhrak sObke neuta de deo.	Okhrake sobhekaike neuta dei deliOn.	arā sObuke neuta/ khabar diyan deo.
The tree comes out from the seed.	muji lẽ gach hek.	Bihin lẽ gach heuEik.	muji lẽ gach haye.
Cows are grazing in the field.	gOru gila bai dẽ cOrOhOt.	gOru gilin taiNdẽ cOrOhOt.	gOru gila bai dẽ cOrchhen.
You are not going to school.	tÕe iskulẽ ni jais.	tÕe iskulẽ nihi jais.	tuiñ iskulẽ na jais.
He did not do the work.	Õe kamTa ni kOrlak.	Õe kamTa nihi kOllak.	U kamTa nai kærla.
Go to my house.	mOr gharke ke ja.	Moi Ghar jaho.	hamar gharke ke ja.

== Numbers ==
The basic Kurmali cardinal numbers are:

English	Kurmali (Old)	Kurmali (Current)
1	eRi	ek
2	dORi/duhuñ	dui
3	ghurOin	tin
4	chail/gONda	caer
5	cOmpa	pãc
6	jheig	chO
7	sutOil	sat
8	aaThoi	aTh
9	nomi	nO
10	baNri	dOs
20	khonRi/khonDi	kuRie
40	mOn	dui kuRie

== Language use ==
The language Kurmali (Kudmali) is spoken by 555,465 people as a native language in India. The Kudmi (Kudmi Mahato), the native speakers of the language, are the main users. (Note: "Kurmali is a corrupt form of Magahi, which, as the name implies, is the tongue of the aboriginal Kurmis of Chota Nagpur (not the Bihari cultivating caste of the same name). It was returned as the language of 211,411 persons in Manbhum, where the Kurmis number 291,729. It is not confined to them, however, but is spoken by many other castes. This patois is also known as Khotta or Khotta Bengali, and is written in the Bengali character. Locally it is regarded as a corrupt form of Bengali. It is reported that even in Ranchi, though Bihari words are used, the terminations are often Bengali. In Mayurbhanj it is usually called Kurmi Bengali or Kurumali Bengali, as well as simply Kurmi. With regard to its character, the late Maharaja of Mayurbhanj wrote as follows :— The mother-tongue of the Kurmis of Mayurbhanj is Bengali, with the peculiar intonation belonging to them. These Kurmis have, as a rule, come from Midnapore and settled permanently in Mayurbhanj. Their dialect shows traces of Hindi and Oriya as well but it can not be called either." Quoted) As per The People of India (1992), the language is spoken by ten communities as a mother tongue, including two Scheduled Tribe and three Scheduled Caste communities. (Note: A community speaking Kudmali language as mother tongue in one administrative-linguistic zone may not necessarily speak that same language as mother tongue in another administrative-linguistic zone.) Those ten communities include Bedia, Bagal, Dharua, Dom, Jolha, Kamar, Kumhar, Tanti, Nai, Ghasi, Karga, and Rautia. In addition, bilingual tribals like Bhumij, Ho, Kharia, Lohara (or Lohar), Mahli, Munda, Oraon, Santal, Savar and Bathudi communities speak the language as a second or subsequent language.

The language contributes to community identity in festivals like Bandna, Tusu, Karam and Jhumair, in which the songs are formatted in Kurmali. An example of this is the Jhumar song.

== Education ==
There are some institutions, where the Kurmali language is a higher education core subject.

- Binod Bihari Mahto Koylanchal University, Dhanbad
- Dr. Shyama Prasad Mukherjee University, Ranchi
- Kolhan University, Chaibasa
- Kotshila Mahavidyalaya, Purulia
- Ranchi University, Ranchi
- Jhargram University, Jhargram
- Sidho Kanho Birsha University, Purulia
- Vinoba Bhave University, Hazaribag
