= Chisoi =

Alphabetic writing system created for the Kurmali language in India

Chisoi Alphabet Chisoi Chinhap
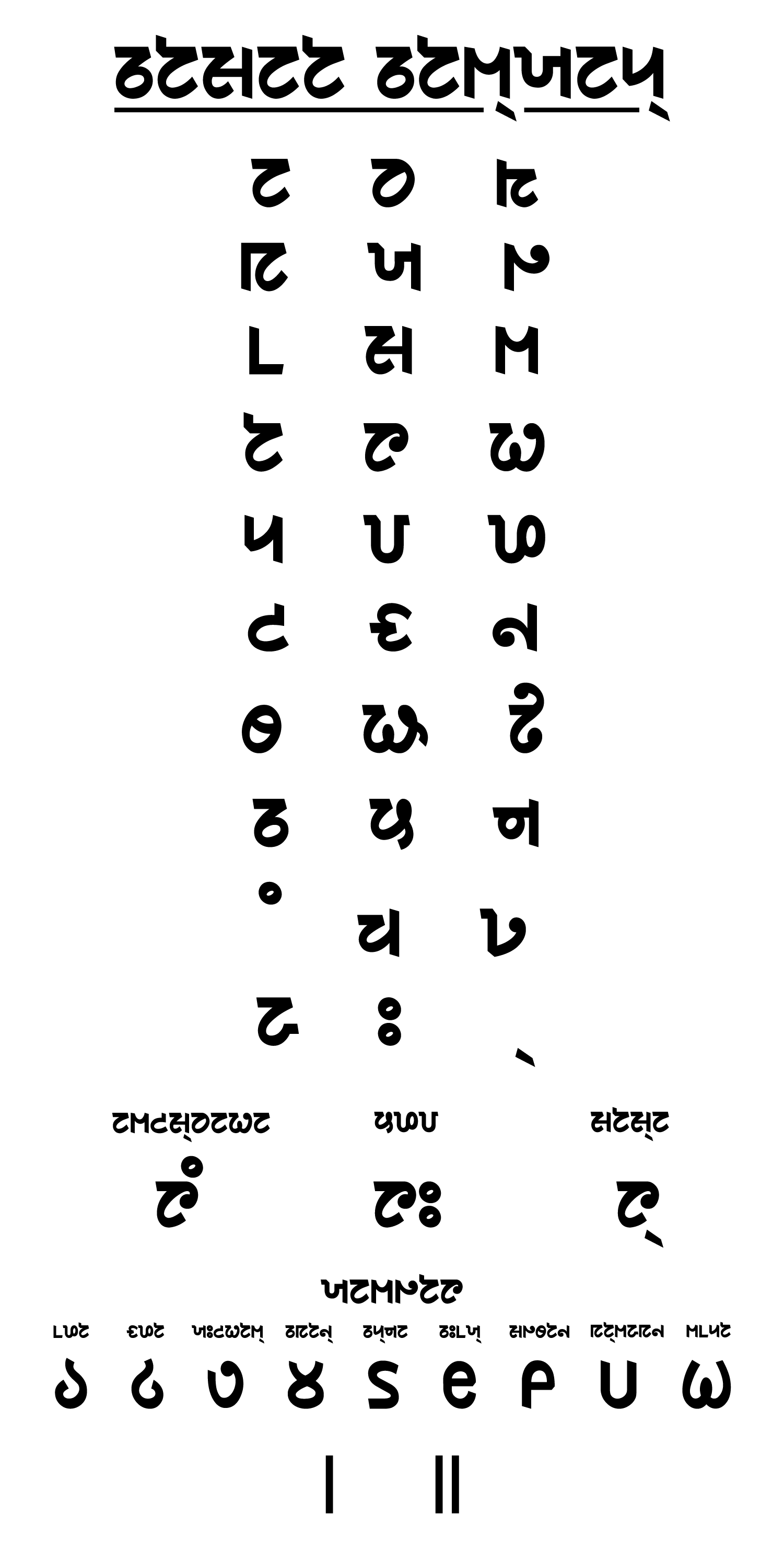
- Chisoi Alphabet Chart
- Script type: Alphabet
- Creator: Jayanta Kumar Mahata
- Created: 1986
- Period: 1986–present
- Direction: Left-to-right
- Languages: Kudmali

Related scripts
- Parent systems: Original Invention: Chisoi Alphabet

Unicode
- Unicode range: U+16D80–U+16DAF

The Chisoi alphabet or Kurmali Lipi is a alphabetic writing system used to write the Kudmali language spread across West Bengal, Jharkhand, Odisha and Assam in northeastern India. It was invented by Jayanta Kumar Mahata, a native speaker, in 1986 as an authentic way to write the phonetics of Kurmali. Various school primers and educational materials have been published in this script. Though the predominant scripts for writing Kudmali remain Devanagari, Bengali and Odia, community-led efforts have increased its use across Jharkhand.

Chisoi is a unicameral alphabet written from left to right with no ligatures or conjuncts. It has 30 basic alphabets, 27 basic consonants and 3 diacritic markers, along with 10 numeric signs.

== History ==
The Chisoi alphabet was invented in 1986 by Jayanta Kumar Mahata, a Kurmali linguist and school teacher from Bamundiha village in the Jhargram district of West Bengal. Mahata stated that his grandfather, a Kurmali folklore singer, influenced his decision to create a distinct script for their community. The characters were developed by studying ancient Kurmali community symbols, totemic signs, and traditional arts such as Alpanas and Rangolis.

The central letterforms of Chisoi are derived from the religious symbol of Buṛhābābā, representing the Kurmali belief in the first human being to realize God.

== Etymology ==
The script's name, Chisoi, derives from a Kurmali rhyme: "Cis Cisôi Cisio, Cisā Cisi Sikhio", where "Chisoi" translates to "drawn" or "written". The name was officially introduced in Mahata's 1994 publication, Kurmali Chisoi Chinhap.

== Structure ==
Chisoi is a unicameral alphabet written from left to right in horizontal lines. Unlike many other Brahmic scripts of India, Chisoi does not use complex ligatures or conjunct consonants. The script consists of 40 characters: 28 letters (8 vowels and 20 consonants), 2 diacritic signs, and 10 numeric digits.

== Usage ==
The Kurmali language has been recognised by the governments of Jharkhand and West Bengal as an additional official language. To promote the script natively, Mahata founded the All India Kurmali Chisoi-A Society in 1994. This organisation has been involved in standardising the script and introducing it into the regional education system. In 2009, the society opened the first private Kurmali elementary schools and adult education centres to teach the writing system.

By 2022, 49 new primary schools teaching the Chisoi script had opened in the Purulia district, rising to 54 across West Bengal by 2024. The alphabet is also taught in 10 elementary schools under the Government of India's Samagra Shiksha educational mission, including schools in Gadra, Sonakhuli, and Joypur.

Beyond formal education, the script is also used in print media. A weekly local newspaper named Aaddas is printed and published in the Chisoi script.

== Digitization ==
Efforts to support the Chisoi script digitally began in 2000 when the first TrueType font for the script, named KurmaliChisoy, which was used to print regional books, magazines, and pamphlets. Another TrueType font, Biswa_Chisoi, was developed in 2021.

In September 2023, Translation Commons released a localised Kurmali digital keyboard layout (v1.01), allowing users to type the Chisoi script on modern devices.

=== Unicode ===
In November 2022, a formal proposal was submitted to the Unicode Consortium to encode the Chisoi alphabet. The script has been included in the Unicode 18.0 beta review draft and is allocated to the block U+16D80–U+16DAF.
