= Sadanic languages =

Group of Eastern Indo-Aryan languages

Sadanic
- Geographic distribution: Chota Nagpur Plateau
- Ethnicity: Sadan peoples
- Linguistic classification: Indo-European: Indo-Iranian; Indo-Aryan; Eastern; Bihari; Sadanic
- Subdivisions: Kurmali/Panchpargania; Nagpuri; Khortha

Language codes
- Glottolog: sada1243 Sadanic

The Sadanic languages are Bihari languages in the Indo-Aryan languages. The languages are mostly spoken in the Jharkhand state of India.

According to the 2011 Census of India, the Sadanic languages had 5.7 million native speakers: 5.1 million Nagpuri (including 4.3 million Sadri), 0.3 million Kurmali Thar, and 0.2 million Panch Pargania.

== Etymology ==
The Nagpuri language is known as Sadani as the native language of the Sadan people, the Indo-Aryan ethnolinguistic group of Chotanagpur. Sadani also referred to closely related Indo-Aryan languages of Jharkhand such as Nagpuri, Panchpargania, Kurmali and Khortha. The origin of the word Sadan is somewhat obscure.

== History ==
The Indo Aryan languages of Jharkhand such as Nagpuri, Panchpargania, Kurmali, and Khortha are known as Sadani languages. Earlier linguists had classified these languages as dialects of Bhojpuri and Magahi, but recent research suggests that these languages developed from a single ancestor language and are closer to each other than to other Bihari languages. Their differences are due to their geographical distribution and contact with different tribal Munda languages.

According to scholars, the Sadri/Nagpuri language was in contact with the Mundari language. Due to widespread use as a lingua franca, it lost ergativity as Munda languages have no ergativity. It gained attributive possession between alienable and inalienable in third person possessor. It lacks loan words from Dravidian and Austroasiatic languages but contributed countless loan words in its contact languages. According to Abbi (1997), Indo-Aryan languages influenced Dravidian and Austroasiatic languages. The converse markers of Kharia (-ke, -kon) and Kurukh (-ki) are due to influence from Indo-Aryan languages.

Panchparganiya does not have large numbers of loan words. It retain its morphological ergativity and did not develop an alienable or inalienable distinction in attributive possession.
