= Ginjo Thakurgaon =

Ginjo Thakurgaon Thakurgaon
- Village
- Location in Jharkhand, India Ginjo Thakurgaon (India)
- Coordinates: 23.52°N 85.17°E
- Country: India
- State: Jharkhand
- District: Ranchi
- Elevation: 625 m (2,051 ft)

Population
  - Total: 5,862

Languages
  - Official: Hindi, Nagpuri, English
- Time zone: UTC+5:30 (IST)
- PIN: 835205
- Telephone code: 06531
- Vehicle registration: JH-01
- Distance from Ranchi: 25 kilometres (16 mi) NW

Ginjo Thakurgaon is a village situated in the northern region of the Ranchi district (Burmu block) in Jharkhand. It is about 25 km north-west of Ranchi, the capital city of Jharkhand. The village is bounded by Mandar, Burmu, Pithauria, Chund and Ratu.

Monday and Thursday each weekly haat or market in Ginjo Thakurgaon where people come from different villages and shopping. Otherwise, the main vegetable market are Brambe and Makhmandro (Katulahna) for the farmer where they can sell their own vegetable.

Forest Research Center at Mandar and Patratu Thermal Power Station at Patratu, Hazaribagh are within a short distance.

== Geography ==
Ginjo Thakurgaon is located at 23.52°N 85.17°E. It has an average elevation of 625 m (2,051 ft).

== Places of interest ==
SNo	Name Of the Place	Interest For	Distance From City	Way of
1.	Bhawani Shankar Mandir (भवानी शंकर मन्दिर)	Religious Temple	Centre Of the City	School Road
2.	Bhoor Nadi (Aikashi Mahadeo भुर नदी (ऐकैशी महादेव)	Religious	3–5 km	Ginjo Thakurgaon Mandar Road
3.	Kanke Dam, Ranchi	Tourist	25 km	Kanke Road
4.	Gonda Hill, Ranchi	Tourist	25 km	Kanke Road
5.	Rock Garden, Ranchi	Tourist	25 km	Kanke Road
6.	Pahari Mandir, Ranchi	Tourist	25 km	Ratu Road
7.	Ranchi Lake, Ranchi	Tourist	25 km	Ranchi
8.	Tagore Hill, Ranchi	Tourist	30 km	Bariatu Road
9.	Ormanjhi National Park (Birsa Zoological Park), Ranchi	National Park	35 km	NH 33
10.	Deer Park	National Park	40 km	Ranchi - Khunti Road
11.	Dasham Fall	Tourist	60 km	Ranchi - Tata Road
12.	Hundru Fall	Tourist	50 km	Ranchi - Purulia Road
13.	Jonha Fall	Tourist	50 km	Ranchi - Purulia Road
14.	Hirni Fall	Tourist	90 km	Ranchi - Chaibasa Road
15.	Panchghagh Fall	Tourist	70 km	Ranchi - Chaibasa Road
16.	Sun temple	Religious	45 km	Ranchi - Tata Road
17.	Tiru Fall, Sarle	Tourist	17 km	Ginjo Thakurgaon - Burmu / Makka Road

== Bhawani Shankar Mandir ==
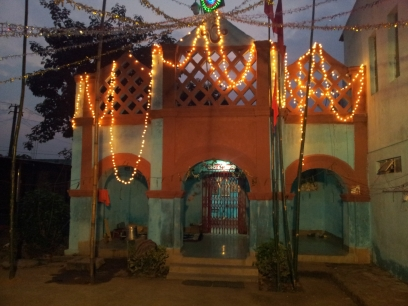

== Schools ==
SNo	Name Of the School	Co-Education	Government / Private
1.	Bhawani Shankar High School	No - (Boys)	Government
2.	Rajyakrit Madhyamik Vidyalaya	No - (Boys)	Government
3.	Rajyakrit Kanya Madhyamik Vidyalaya	No - (Girls)	Government
4.	Project Kanya High School	No - (Girls)	Government
5.	Saraswati Shishu Mandir	Yes	Private
6.	Adivasi Bal Vikas Vidyalaya	Yes	Private

== Communication ==
SNo	Provider	Technology
1	BSNL	Landline, GSM
2	Reliance JIO	GSM
3	AirTel	GSM
4	Vodafone Idea	GSM
