= Kol uprising =

1831-1833 Tribal Rebellion

- Part of Indian independence movement
- Date: 1831–1832
- Location: Jharkhand; 22°50′N 85°40′E
- Goals: Protection of tribal autonomy
- Result: Surrendered and estates transferred to South-West Frontier

Casualties
- Death: Unknown
- Injuries: Unknown
- Location of the rebellion

The Kol uprising, also referred to in British records as the Kol mutiny, was a revolt of the tribal Kol people of the Chota Nagpur plateau that occurred between 1831 and 1832. The uprising was primarily triggered by economic exploitation resulting from the systems of land tenure and administration introduced by the East India Company.

The tribal communities of Chota Nagpur, including the Mundas, Oraons, Hos, and Bhumijs, were collectively referred to as Kols. Initially, the insurgents targeted and killed Sikh and Muslim thikedars (contractors) who were engaged in tax collection through various means. Subsequently, the violence extended to include attacks on Hindus in nearby villages, along with the looting and burning of their houses.

The rebellion was eventually suppressed through the killing and arrest of its leaders and their followers, under the command of Thomas Wilkinson.

== Background ==
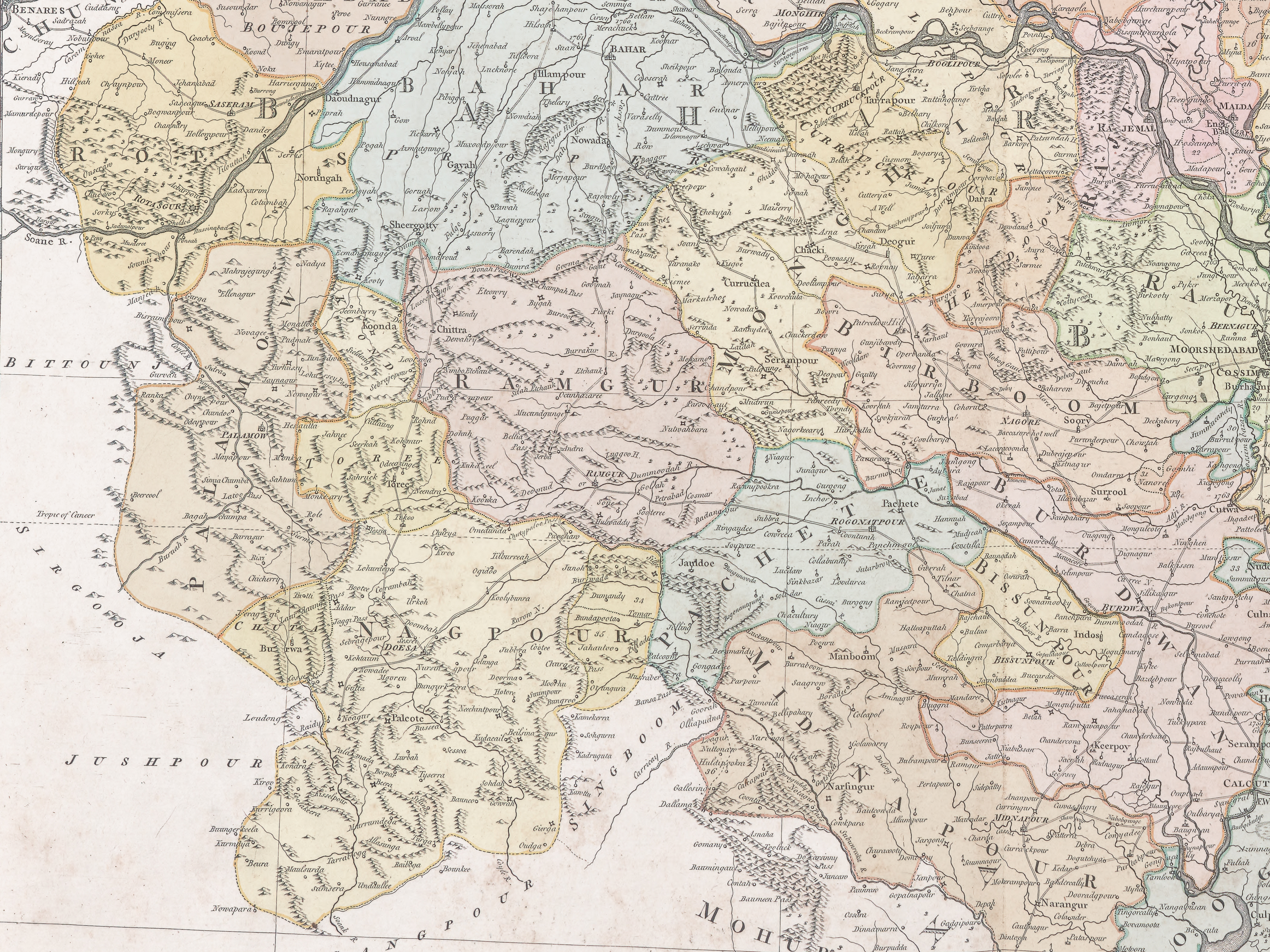
Singhbhum district and eastern region of Chota Nagpur, epicenter of the Kol uprising. (1779 map by Rennell).

In the 18th century, Nagvanshi king Maninath Shah (1748–1762) consolidated his authority over the estates of Bundu, Silli, Barwe, Rahe, and Tamar. The chiefs of these estates were compelled to acknowledge the Nagvanshi ruler as their overlord. These chiefs were known as Mankis of their respective areas.

During the 19th century, some Mankis revolted after being dispossessed by the Nagvanshi rulers and replaced by thikedars (contractors) appointed to collect taxes, which were levied to repay the debts of the Nagvanshi kingdom. In response, these displaced Mankis and their followers attacked other Mankis in the region, looted and burnt the houses of thikedars, and plundered as well as destroyed Hindu villages.

The uprising was also a reaction to the appointment of a Political Agent to the Government in South Bihar and the recently ceded districts around 1819. This led to an influx of people into these areas, which were traditionally inhabited and governed by various aboriginal tribes through the Munda-Manki system. With the implementation of new land laws, the Kols were increasingly exploited by outsiders engaged in commercial activities.

Another source of discontent was the imposition of taxes on the movement of goods such as salt, which had previously been traded freely. Corrupt administrative practices and widespread lawlessness further exacerbated the situation. Following the dispossession of certain Mankis, their supporters retaliated by looting and burning the homes of newly settled people and neighbouring Hindu villages.

== Insurgency ==
Harinath Shahi, the brother of Nagvanshi king Jagannath Shah Deo, granted lands in Sonpur Pargana to some Sikh horse traders and a Muslim cloth merchant for tax collection, as a means to repay debts. These lands, comprising twelve villages, belonged to Singrai Manki and Mohan Manki. Following this, the Mankis were dispossessed, and their two sisters were allegedly seduced by the Sikhs and kept as concubines. Similarly, the twelve villages of Byjunath Manki were granted to Hussain Khan, who then had the Manki arrested by the police at Govindpur and sent to jail in Sherghati. The thikedars collected taxes through various exploitative practices, including abwabs (cesses) and salami (tributes).

In response, the Mundas of the region convened a meeting and launched a rebellion marked by looting, arson, and killings, initially targeting Sikhs and Muslims. The houses of Saifullah Khan, Muhammad Ali Naik, and Zafar Ali Khan Pathan were looted, and the occupants killed. Subsequently, the insurgents extended their attacks to include Hindus in nearby villages. Then Oraons and Hos later joined the uprising, seeking to expel the Sad (Sadan or Hindu settlers) and Dikus (outsiders or foreigners).

According to Colonel Edward Tuite Dalton, in every pargana, villages inhabited by Sadan (non-tribal Hindus) were destroyed, and any Dikus captured by the rebels were murdered. The zamindars of Rahe, Bundu, Tamar, and Barwe—though neither Sadan nor Dikus—narrowly escaped with their lives when their estates were also sacked and destroyed.

The rebellion soon spread across the Ranchi district. The insurgents engaged in widespread plunder and killings, primarily targeting non-tribals, especially the Sadan population. The unrest persisted for several months. The rebels also destroyed the Mahamaya Temple, constructed by Nagvanshi king Gajghat Rai, and killed the wife and children of the temple’s caretaker, Barju Ram, who later described the incident in a Nagpuri poem.

British historiography often characterised the Kol uprising as banditry. In 1831, the Kol tribesmen of Chhota Nagpur, angered by exploitation under the East India Company (EIC), rose in revolt. The rebels were led by figures such as Budhu Bhagat, Joa Bhagat, Jhindrai Manki, and others. The Kols were increasingly agitated by the encroachment of non-tribal communities—Hindus, Muslims, and Sikhs—into their territories. The new landlords frequently imposed forced labour, levied fines, and confiscated tribal cattle. The insurrection began in 1831 with the plundering and burning of farms belonging to two Sikh thikedars. Armed clashes between the Kols and British forces took place in 1832. Tribes such as the Kharwar and Chero also joined the rebellion.

According to historian Sunil Sen, Budhu Bhagat and his followers conducted a memorable guerrilla campaign using primitive weapons like bows and arrows. British accounts state that the Kol rebels indiscriminately attacked Hindus, Muslims, and other outsiders, looting and burning their homes.

The rebellion was eventually suppressed by British officer Thomas Wilkinson. He led operations that resulted in the deaths of many rebel leaders and their followers. On 14 February 1832, Wilkinson killed Bhagat Singh, a Munda leader, along with his seven sons and approximately 150 of his followers in the village of Sillagaon. He later encamped at Tamar, where he summoned the chiefs of Bundu and Tamar (both Munda) as well as the king of Chotanagpur. Wilkinson sought to expel the Lakra Kol (Hos) from the region.

The Rautias of Sundari, Khunti, Torpa, and surrounding areas conferred upon Wilkinson the title of Baraik in recognition of his role. He then proceeded to Porahat, where he gained the cooperation of some Hos and successfully captured the Kol rebel leader Dasai Manki in 1836. Katey Sardar and Bindrai Manki were apprehended while attending a dinner gathering and were subsequently taken to Kolkata in chains.

== Aftermath ==
Following the suppression of the insurgency, the British established the South-West Frontier Division, with its headquarters at Lohardaga, and set up police stations in various areas to maintain order.

According to British reports, the uprising was attributed to the dispossession of certain Mankis and their mistreatment by thikedars, along with the imposition of various forms of rent and taxes by the East India Company. These measures adversely affected the local population, the majority of whom were described in colonial records as poor and possessing a "half-savage mentality."

== See also ==
- Santhal rebellion
- Budhu Bhagat
- Birsa Munda
