= Surjahi Puja =

Festival in Jharkhand

- Observed by: Sadan
- Type: Regional festival
- Significance: Dedication towards the Sun
- Observances: Jharkhand
- Date: First 3 days of Aghan (November/December) or Magh (January/February)
- Frequency: Every 5 years

Surjahi Puja (सुरजाही पूजा, IAST: Surajāhī pūjā) is a puja celebrated by the Sadan people of Jharkhand.

== Etymology ==
Surjahi is a joint word of Suraj, which means sun and ahi means is.

== Celebration ==
At the puja, people venerate the sun. The puja is celebrated once every five years. It is observed on the first three days in the Hindu months of Aghan or Magh. It is celebrated when a wish is fulfilled and is celebrated in the courtyards of houses.
