= Govind Nath Shah =

Nagvanshi king

- Maharaja
- Reign: c.1806-1822 CE
- Predecessor: Deo Nath Shah
- Successor: Jagannath Shah Deo
- Born: Palkot
- Died: July 1822; Palkot
- Issue: Jagannath Shah Deo; Srinath Shah Deo; Mohan Nath Shah Deo
- Dynasty: Nagvanshi
- Religion: Hinduism

Govind Nath Shah was a Nagvanshi king in the 19th century. His capital was at Palkot. He succeeded Deo Nath Shah and ruled from 1806 to 1822 CE.

== Reign ==
The king Deo Nath Shah ruled from 1790 to 1806. He didn't pay revenue to East India company. He had three son Govind Nath Shah, Gopi Nath Shah and Vishwa Nath Shah. The elder son Govind Nath Shah became king. When his brothers claimed the share in chieftaincy, he disposed them. His brothers complained to the British. The prime minister Din Dayal became arrogant and took all affair into his hand. He removed tenure holders who complained to the British. In 1808, the British troops marched to the capital, and Din Dayal fled to Kolkata where he was arrested and taken to Chatra. The Govind Nath Shah cleared the previous arrears of Rs. 35000 and stationed British troops at his headquarter. The disputes of Govind Nath Shah with his brothers resolved. He came under direct control of Magistrate of Ramgarh. The British promised to protect him as long as he remained loyal to them.

In 1811-1812, a rebellion occurred in Nawagarh under leadership of Baidh Nath Shah, the Jagirdar of Nawagarh. He carried out raid on Burwa, Jashpur region and plundered several villages. The Jagirdar of Basudev Kona, Bakhtar Say and Parganit of Pahar Pani Mundal Singh also joined the Rebellion. In the beginning, British troops were not successful in suppressing Rebellion. Later they mobilized huge battalion and the troops arrived in Nawagarh on 24 March 1812. British mobilized the troops at his headquarter and Baid Nath Shah fled to Surguja. Govind Nath Shah stopped paying tax in pretext of rebellion. He didn't pay revenue till 1814; so, Amin Muhammad Ali visited to access and collect revenue in June 1814. But the king promised to pay revenue within four months on the basis of installments. However, he failed to pay revenue due to unwillingness of his subordinate Jagirdars and Jamindars to pay their revenue. He requested the assistant collector of Ramgarh, Thomas Campbell Robertson to attach the estate of Tamar and Barkagarh who had not paid their revenue. But Thomas Campbell Robertson failed to take action against Govid Shahi of Tamar and Raghunath Shah of Barkagarh. Govind Nath Shah was not able to pay the revenue till 1817, so British took direct control of Chotanagpur.

There was a rebellion in Tamar. Governor general sent A.J. Calvin the magistrate of Jungle Mahal to Tamar, but he could not succeed to suppress the rebellion. Goughsedge again sent the forty matchlock under the command of Sheikh Inayatulah on 20 November 1819 to protect the Govind Nath Shah from rebels and protect the Tamar from ravages of insurgents. The rebels attacked the troops but repulsed. The leader of the forces of king got injured. On 1 December, the numbers of rebels increased to 2000, and they occupied a village near resident of king and burnt down a village. The king sent his men against the rebels but could not succeed, then he took the help of troops of Inayatulah who succeeded in drive rebels into forest. Goughsedge rushed to Tamar and in January 1820, the rebels were driven out from Tamar to forest. The two rebel leaders Gughdeo and Kunta fled. Later Rughdeo was arrested in July 2020 with the assistance of Kunwar Bikram Singh of Saraikela. Later Kunta also was arrested and sent to Medinipur, then Ramgarh. The Rebellion of Tamar ended but continued in another area. The Lakra Kol (Hos) continued their insurgency, plundered and burnt down several villages. By the end of April 1821, the rebels were defeated and fled to forest.

In July 1822, Govind Nath Shah died. He had three sons Jagannath Shah Deo, Shrinath Shah Deo and Mohan Nath Shah Deo. The elder son Jagannath Shah Deo succeeded the throne.
