= Budhu Bhagat =

Leader of Kol Uprising (1792-1832)

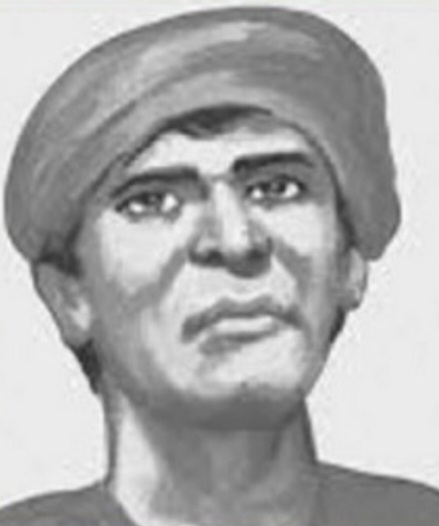
- Born: 17 February 1792; Silagai, Chanho, (now in Ranchi , Jharkhand), British India
- Died: 13 February 1832 (aged 39); Silagai, Chanho, (now in Ranchi, Jharkhand), British India
- Known for: Kol rebellion Lakra rebellion

Budhu Bhagat was an Indian rebel. He had led guerrilla warfare against British. He was leader of Kol rebellion and Larka rebellion in 1831-32 in Chhotanagpur.

== Biography ==
He was born on 17 February 1792 in Silagai village of Chanho block in Ranchi district in British India. He was born into an Oraon farmer family.

== Rebellion ==
Kol rebellion was spread to Ranchi, Hazaribagh, Palamu and Manbhum. In 1831, Budhu Bhagat led Kol rebellion against the British.

In 1832, Buddhu Bhagat led a revolt with the tribals of Chhotanagpur against the oppressive rule of the British and the zamindars. This revolt is known as Larka rebellion, in which the Oraon, Munda, Bhumij, Ho etc. tribals contributed. The British announced a reward for capturing Budhu Bhagat. British forces arrived to Silagai village on 13 February 1832, and faces stiff resistance from followers of Budhu Bhagat. They attacked British forces with bows, arrows, axes and swords. Budhu Bhagat's sons Haldhar Bhagat and Giridhar Bhagat got killed. Budhu Bhagat was captured and killed by the British.
