= Ghasi Ram Mahli =

Indian Nagpuri-language poet

Mahakabi Ghasi Ram Mahli
- घासीराम महली
- Born: 17 January 1859; Karkat, Chanho block, Ranchi district, British India
- Died: 1937 (aged 77–78)
- Occupations: Postmaster; Master; Poet
- Relatives: Bhado ram Mahli (father); Noni Mahli (mother)
- Writing career
- Language: Nagpuri
- Genres: Poetry, Songwriter
- Notable works: Nag Vanshavali Jhumar; Barahamasa; Vivha Parichhan; Nagpuri Faag Satak; Durga Saptasati; Lalana Ranjana; Sita Swayambar; Chandi Puran; Ram Janam; Sudama Charitra; Sundarkand; Usha Haran; Nagpuri Fagua Geet; Shiv struti

Ghasi Ram Mahli (Hindi: घासीराम महली; 17 January 1859 – 1937) was an Indian Nagpuri-language poet. He was a poet under the patronage of Nagvanshi Lal Thakur of Thakurgaon. He was the first poet of the Nagpuri language, whose book was published in 1911.

== Early life ==
He was born in Karkat village of Chanho block in Ranchi district to Bhado ram Mahli and Noni Mahli in a Mahli family.

== Works ==
He was post master, then master. He was a poet. He was given patronage by Nagvanshi Lal Thakur of Thakurgaon. He was the first poet in the Nagpuri language, whose book was published in 1911. He wrote several poems including "Nag Vanshavali Jhumar", "Barahamasa", "Vivha Parichhan", "Nagpuri Faag Satak", "Durga Saptasati", "Lalana Ranjana", "Sita Swayambar", "Chandi Puran", "Ram Janam", "Sudama Charitra", "Sundarkand", "Usha Haran", "Nagpuri Fagua Geet", Shiv stuti etc.
