= Shivdas Karn =

- Raja
- Reign: 14th century
- Predecessor: Go Karn
- Dynasty: Nagvanshi
- Religion: Hinduism

Shivdas Karn was Nagvanshi king in 14th century. He succeeded Go Karn.

He established Vishnu idol in the Hapamuni temple in Gumla district in Vikram Samvat 1458 (1401 CE) according to an inscription in Sanskrit. The temple was earlier constructed by Gajghat Rai in Vikram samvat 965 (908 CE). The inscription mention the name of Rastrakuta Brahmin Shianath Dev.

During the 16th century, Sri Chaitanya visited the temple when he was returning from his journey from Puri to Varanasi. During kol rebellion (1931–1933), the rebels destroyed the original temples. They killed the wife and children of the caretaker of the temple, Barju Ram. He has described the incident in his Nagpuri poem.
