= Praful Kumar Rai =

Indian Nagpuri-language writer

Praful Kumar Roy
- Born: 8 February 1926; Pahar Bangru, Bharno, Ranchi district (now Gumla district), British India
- Died: 7 February 1991 (aged 64)
- Education: M.Com
- Occupations: Government employee; Writer; Singer
- Relatives: Pandey Ramkishor Roy (father); Suchitrabala Devi (mother)
- Writing career
- Language: Nagpuri
- Notable works: Son Jhair; Barkha; Barkha Bund; Nagpuri Kavi; Awsar ni mile bujhu; Kilkila

Praful Kumar Roy was an Indian writer. He was one of the prominent writers of the Nagpuri-language in the modern period. He had a prominent role in publication in the Nagpuri language and in the formation of Nagpuri Bhasha Parishad in 1960.

== Life ==
=== Early life ===
He was born on 8 February 1926 in Pahar Bangru village of Bharno in Ranchi district (now Gumla district). His father's name was Pandey Ramkishor Rai and mother's name was Suchitrabala Devi. He studied Bachelor of Commerce.

=== Career ===
He started his career as a government employee in Central Coalfields. He was also a writer and singer. His writings are published in various magazines such as Ranchi Times and All India Radio. He wrote Son Jhair (collection of stories), Barkha, Barkha Bund, Nagpuri Kavi, Awsar ni mile bujhu and Kilkila. He had a prominent role in the publication of writings in the Nagpuri language and in the formation of Nagpuri Bhasha Parishad in 1960.
