= Mundal Singh =

- Born: Pahar Pani, Gumla district, Bengal Presidency, (now in Jharkhand), British India
- Died: 4 April 1812; Kolkata, British India
- Cause of death: Execution by hanging
- Occupation: Parganait

Mundal Singh was an Indian freedom fighter. He was Parganait of Pahar Pani. He and Jagirdar of Basudev Kona Bakhtar Say had fought against East India Company force in 1812.

== Early life ==
Mundal Singh was born in Pahar Pani village of Gumla district in Bengal Presidency in a Rautia family who originally belong to the sub-caste of Koeri. He was Parganait of Pahar Pani.

== Rebellion ==
British Government ordered King of Chotanagpur Govind Nath Shah to pay Rs.12000 tax to East India company in 1812. Jagirdar of Basudev Kona Bakhtar Say refused to pay tax on behalf of peasants of Nawagarh due to excessive tax. Then magistrate of Ramgarh sent an army from Hazaribagh. Parganait of Pahar Panri Mundal Singh reached Nawagarh, helped Bakhtar Say in Battle and they succeed in defeating British force. After a month, E.Refreez of Ramgarh Battalion came to Nawagarh with a large army. The battle lasted for three days and the force of Bakhtar Say and Mundal Singh got defeated. Bakhtar Say and Mundal Singh were arrested and executed by hanging on 4 April 1812 in Kolkata.
