= Jhora =

Social group of Odisha, Chhattisgarh and Jharkhand, East India

- Religions: Hinduism
- Country: India
- Original state: Jharkhand, Chhattisgarh, Odisha
- Related groups: Kewat

Jhora is a caste found in the states of Jharkhand, Chhatishgarh and Odisha in India. Their traditional occupation was fishing and boating.

== History ==
The traditional occupation of Jhora caste was fishing, boating and farming. They found in district of Simdega, Khunti, Jashpur, Sundargarh and Sambalpur. They used to participate in the battle with Rajput. The king of Biru in Simdega was of Jhora caste.

Due to construction of Bridges in rivers and streams, now they have left the occupation of boating. Now they do farming and fishing for livelihoods. They are a neglected community.

== Social status ==
They are in the list of Other Backward Class in Jharkhand for reservation.
