= LPN Shahdeo =

Justice LPN Shahdeo

Personal details
- Born: Lal Pingla Nath Shahdeo; 3 January 1930 Kaamta, Latehar district, Chota Nagpur Division, Bihar and Orissa Province (now Jharkhand), India
- Died: 10 January 2012 (aged 82) Ranchi, Jharkhand
- Spouse: Prabha Shahdeo
- Children: Pratul Shahdeo; Sangita Deo; Kriti Singh; Babita Singh; Shilpi Singhdeo
- Relatives: Mr Ratan Kumar; Dr Ashok Kumar Singh; Mr Pankaj Singh; Mr Subir Singhdeo
- Education: Ranchi College
- Occupation: Jurist and Jharkhand Movement Political Activist

Lal Pingla Nath Shahdeo (3 January 1930 – 10 January 2012) was an Indian jurist and political activist. He had led the movement for a separate Jharkhand state in 1998–99 by forming committee of all political parties. He helped in achieving the status of a separate state for Jharkhand.

== Early life and education ==
He was born on 3 January 1930 in a Nagvanshi royal family in Kaamta village of Latehar district in Bihar and Orissa Province (now Jharkhand). He completed his primary education in a government school and matriculation from Balkrishna High school in Ranchi. After graduation from Ranchi College, he completed his study of law in 1954.

His Late Wife was Smt. Prabha Shahdeo and they are survived by 5 children - Mrs. Sangita Singhdeo, Mrs. Kriti Singh, Mrs. Babita Singh, Mrs Shilpi Singhdeo and Pratul Shahdeo.

== Career ==
Lal Pingley Nath Shahdeo joined judicial services in 1958 and his first posting was at post of munsif in Hazaribagh. He became the first person of Jharkhand to become a judge in the High Court. He became the district and session judge of Dhanbad in 1989. He was the judge at Ranchi bench of Patna High Court from 1986 to 1992.

He was a supporter of separate state since long. In 1992, after retiring from High Court, he started supporting the movement on public platforms, through his writings in local newspapers and helping in legal issue. He led the movement in 1998-99, when the movement was falling apart. In 1998, the Union government decided to send the Bill concerning formation of Jharkhand State to Bihar Legislative Assembly to which Lalu Prasad Yadav had said that the State would be divided over his dead body.

BJP, JMM, AJSU, Congress, a total of 16 political parties came in one platform and formed 'All Party Separate State Formation Committee' to start the movement. Justice Shahdeo was elected as the convener of the committee.

The voting on Jharkhand Act was to be done on 21 September 1998 in Bihar legislation. On that day, the committee under the leadership of Justice Shahdeo called for Jharkhand Bandh and organised a protest march. Thousands of supporters of separate state took to streets in leadership of Justice Shadeo by the slogan of Pehle mati, fir Party. He was arrested and detained in kotwali police station for hours along with many supporters.

== Death ==
He died on 10 January 2012 at the age of 82.
