= Bakhtar Say =

- Born: Nawagarh, Raidih, Gumla district, (now in Jharkhand), British India
- Died: 4 April 1812; Kolkata, British India
- Cause of death: Execution by hanging
- Occupation: Jagirdar

Bakhtar Say was an Indian freedom fighter. He was Jagirdar of Basudev Kona. He had fought against East India Company force in 1812 along with Parganait of Pahar Panri Mundal Singh.

== Early life ==
Bakhtar Say was born in Nawagarh in Raidih block of Gumla district in British India. He was a Jagirdar of Basudev Kona. He was born in Rautia family.

== Rebellion ==
When British Government ordered King of Chotanagpur Govind Nath Shah to pay Rs.12000 tax to East India Company in 1812. Bakhtar Say refused to pay tax to East India Company on behalf of peasants of Nawagarh due to excessive tax. It provoked fight in which Bakhtar Say killed Ratu courtier Hira Ram who had come to collect tax. Then magistrate of Ramgarh sent an army from Hazaribagh. The force of Bakhtar Say consisted of farmers of that area. Parganait of Pahar Panri Mundal Singh reached Nawagarh and helped Bakhtar Say in Battle. Battle lasted for two days and British force got defeated. A month later, E.Refreez of Ramgarh Battalion marched to Nawagarh with a large army. The battle lasted for three days. Eventually Bakhtar Say and Mundal Singh were arrested and executed on 4 April 1812 in Kolkata.
