= Bhuneshwar Anuj =

Indian journalist, writer, and scholar

- Born: 12 October 1936; Chharda, Sisai, Ranchi district (now Gumla district), Bihar Province (now Jharkhand), British India
- Died: 2 April 2021 (aged 88); Ranchi, Jharkhand, India
- Citizenship: India
- Education: St. Xavier's College, Ranchi
- Occupations: Journalist, writer, and scholar
- Writing career
- Language: Hindi; Nagpuri
- Notable works: Nagpuri Lok Sahitya; Atit ke Darpan me Jharkhand; Chotanagpur ke Prachin Smarak; Jharkhand ke sahid; Shital Bund; Nagpuri aur Uska Lokmanas; Nagpuri Lok katha Sahitya; Nagpuri Padhya lok Sahitya
- Notable awards: Jharkhand Ratna

Bhuneshwar Anuj (12 October 1936 – 2 April 2021) was an Indian journalist, litterateur, and scholar. He is known for his journalism and scholarly works in the Nagpuri language. He also has a prominent role in the separate state movement of Jharkhand. He was central adviser of Lok Seva Samiti.

== Life ==
=== Early life ===
He was born on 12 October 1936 in Chharda village of Sisai in Gumla district in a farmer family. He was journalist. He studied in St. Xavier's College, Ranchi. He studied M.A and P.hd in Hindi.

He took interview of Jaipal Singh Munda in hindi during his college days. Jaipal Singh Munda referred non-tribal as Dikku. When Anuj uttered a word in napuri. Jaipal Singh talk with him in Nagpuri. When He asked about why Jaipal call non-tribal Dikku, Jaipal told that there is no meaning of Dikku and he call Dikku one who do Dik Dik or Dikat means problem. He laughingly referred himself as biggest Dikku as people face problem when he do meetings.

=== Career ===
He had worked in HEC for 32 years alongside his journalism. He established high School in his village Chharda in name of Kartik Oraon. He founded Baidhnath Jalan Mahavidyalaya in Sisai in Gumla district, Sanjay Gandhi Memorial College of Pandra in Ranchi district and Basia college of Basia, Lupung Inter Mahavidyalaya.

He was scholar of Nagpuri language and editor of many magazines. He had prominent role in starting teaching in Nagpuri language and other languages of Jharkhand in various University. He written many books which includes Nagpuri Lok Sahitya which taught in Ranchi University in Graduation, Atit ke Darpan me Jharkhand, Chotanagpur ke Prachin Smarak, Jharkhand ke sahid, Shital Bund, Nagpuri aur Uska Lokmanas, Nagpuri Lok katha Sahitya, Nagpuri Padhya lok Sahitya, Nagpuri Lok Gadhya Sahitya, Chotanagpur ke Janjation aur Sadano Ke Lok Viswas etc. He also edited some books including Dui Dair Bis Phool, Ek Jhopa Nagpuri Phool, Khukdi Rugda. He was editor of Hindi weekly magazine Chotanagpur Sandesh which published about language and literature of different languages, culture and history of Jharkhand and assistant editor of Nagpuri Patrika. He was also editor of various Magazines including Lak Seva Patrika and Jawa Dali. He had prominent role in movement of separate Jharkhand as intellectual.

=== Chhota Nagpuria Teli Utthan Samaj ===
He was also activist and social worker of chhotanagpuria teli society renowned for his works in jharkhand . He was president of Chotanagpuria Teli Utthan Samaj. In 1991, In the leadership of Bhuneshwar Anuj seven member from Sisai went to New Delhi and handover a letter to Home Minister of India to include Teli into Scheduled Tribe category. Then Tribal Research Centre of Ranchi conducted study on Chotanagpuria Teli and Government of Jharkhand recommend to include Teli into category of Scheduled Tribe. But it never happened. In the meeting of June 2013, he told that chhotanagpuria Teli community in Jhakhand is socially, economically, educationally and politically in pathetic condition. Political parties have always cheated and decepted chhotanagpuria Teli society. He demanded Scheduled Tribe status for chhotanagpuria Teli in Jharkhand. In 2018, chottanagpuria Teli society demanded Scheduled Tribe status from government of Jharkhand. Bharatiya Janata Party led government recommend to include Teli along with Kurmi in the category of Scheduled Tribes. It was protested by several tribal organization by organising rally against the move of government in Ranchi.

=== Death ===
He was admitted to Seva Sadan private hospital in Ranchi due to brain haemorrhage in 1 April 2021. He died on Friday 2 April 2021.

== Awards ==
He was awarded Jharkhand Ratna for his contribution in the field of Journalism and education.
