= Nagpuri language =

Eastern Indo-Aryan language

Nagpuri
- Sadri
- Sadani
- The word "Nagpuri" written in Devanagari script
- Native to: India
- Region: West Central Chota Nagpur (Jharkhand, Chhattisgarh and Odisha)
- Ethnicity: Nagpuria
- Speakers: L1: 5.1 million (2011 census); L2: 7.0 million (2007)
- Language family: Indo-European: Indo-Iranian; Indo-Aryan; Eastern; Bihari; Sadanic; Nagpuri
- Writing system: Devanagari; Kaithi (historical)

Official status
- Official language in: India: Jharkhand (additional)

Language codes
- ISO 639-3: Either: sck – Sadri sdr – Oraon Sadri
- Glottolog: sada1242
- Nagpuri-speaking region in India

A multilingual person speaking Sadri, Kharia, and Sambalpuri language, recorded in China.

Nagpuri (also known as Sadri) is an Indo-Aryan language spoken in the Indian states of Jharkhand, Chhattisgarh and Odisha. It is primarily spoken in the west and central Chota Nagpur Plateau region.

It is the native language of the Sadan, the Indo-Aryan ethnic group of Chota Nagpur plateau. In addition to native speakers, it is also used as a lingua franca by many tribal groups such as the Kurukh, a Dravidian ethnic group, and the Kharia, Munda, an Austro-asiatic ethnic groups. A number of speakers from these tribal groups have adopted it as their first language. It is also used as a lingua franca among the Tea-garden community of Assam, West Bengal and Bangladesh who were taken as labourers to work in the tea gardens during the British Period. It is known as Baganiya bhasa in the tea garden area of Assam which is influenced by the Assamese language. According to the 2011 Census, it is spoken by 5.1 million people as a first language. Around 7 million speak it as their second language based on a study from 2007.

A Sadri folk song recorded in Ranchi, India

== Etymology ==
The language is known by several names, such as Nagpuri, Nagpuria, Sadani, Sadri, etc. In the literary tradition, the language is known as Nagpuri, which is the polished and literary language especially used by Hindus and in cities. While Sadri refers to the spoken and non-literary form of the language, especially spoken by tribal groups in the countryside. The name Nagpuri is derived from the region ruled by the Nagvanshi, named as Chutia Nagpur (Chota Nagpur Division) by the British to distinguish it from Nagpur of Maharashtra. Similarly, the Sadani term is derived from the languages of the Sadan ethnolinguistic group of Chotanagpur. The Sadani also refer to closely related Indo-Aryan languages of Jharkhand such as Nagpuri, Panchpargania, Kurmali and Khortha.

Nagpuri language writers are in favour of using Nagpuri as the name of the language. There is an opposition against the use of the word Sadri and giving two names Sadan/Sadri and Nagpuria, to a single language in the 2021 Census of India. According to them, the name of the language is Nagpuri and the native speakers of the language are known as Nagpuria. The British also wrote a grammar using the name Nagpuri in 1906, and Nagpuri is the official name of the language in Jharkhand.

=== Alternate names ===
Alternate names of Nagpuri language include: Sadani, Sadana, Sadati, Sadari, Sadhan, Sadna, Sadrik, Santri, Siddri, Sradri, Sadhari, Sadan, Nagpuria, Chota Nagpuri, Dikku Kaji, Gawari, Ganwari, Goari, Gauuari, Jharkhandhi.

== History ==
There are different opinions among linguists about the origin of the Nagpuri language. According to Peter Shanti Navrangi, Nagpuriya Sadani or Nagpuri originated from ancient Prakrit. According to professor Keshri Kumar Singh, Nagpuri is an Apabhramsha and descendant of Magadhi Prakrit in his book "Nagpuri bhasa ebam Sahitya". According to Dr. Shravan Kumar Goswami, Nagpuri evolved from Ardhamagadhi Prakrit. According to him, Nagpuri might have originated between the 8th to 11th centuries and developed into a full-fledged language between the 14th to 15th centuries. According to Yogendra Nath Tiwari, Nagpuri is an ancient language that was in existence before Chotanagpur or Jharkhand started to be known as Nagpur and evolved from Jharkhand Prakrit. There is no consensus among scholars from which language Nagpuri has evolved. Several similarities are found between the words of Hindi, Nagpuri, Apabrahmsa, Prakrit and Sanskrit.

The Nagpuri language was the court language of the Nagvanshi dynasty and the official language of Chotanagpur till British rule. Evidence of literature is available from the 17th century. In 1903, Sir George Abraham Grierson classified Nagpuri as the Nagpuria dialect of the Bhojpuri language in his "Linguistic Survey of India".

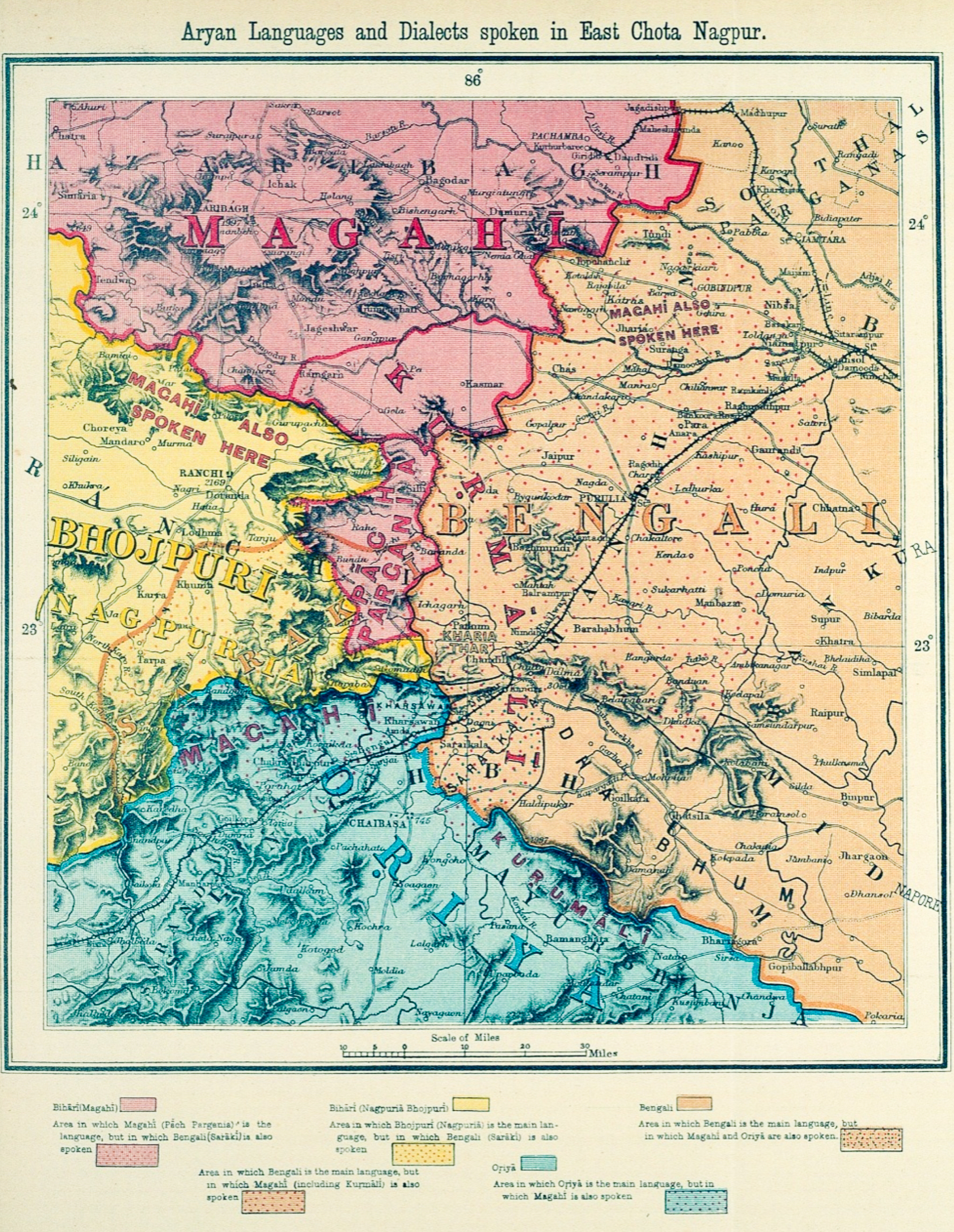
1903 Linguistic map of East Chota Nagpur, by G.A. Grierson

Nagpuri has been placed in the Bihari group of Indo-Aryan languages. It is sometimes considered a dialect of Bhojpuri. Recent studies demonstrate that the Indo-Aryan languages of the Chota Nagpur plateau such as Nagpuri, Khortha, Panchpargania, Kurmali language, which are called Sadani languages, are distinct languages and are more closely related to each other. Nagpuri has been substantially influenced by nearby Dravidian and Munda languages.

== Geographical distribution ==
Distribution of Nagpuri language in the state of India (2011 census)
1. Jharkhand (46.7%)
2. West Bengal (14.5%)
3. Assam (14.0%)
4. Chhattisgarh (12.7%)
5. Odisha (6.80%)
6. Rajasthan (4.10%)
7. Other (1.20%)

The Nagpuri language is mainly spoken in the western Chota Nagpur Plateau region. The geographical distribution of language is tabulated below;

State	Jharkhand	Chhattisgarh	Odisha
District	Ranchi	Jashpur	Sundergarh
District	Gumla	Jashpur	Sundergarh
District	Lohardaga	Jashpur	Sundergarh
District	Latehar	Balrampur	Sundergarh
District	Simdega	Balrampur	Sundergarh
District	Khunti	Balrampur	Sundergarh
District	Hazaribagh	Sarguja	Sundergarh
District	Garhwa	Sarguja	Sundergarh
District	West Singhbhum	Sarguja	Sundergarh

It is also spoken by some Tea garden community in Tea garden area of Assam, West Bengal, Bangladesh and Nepal who were taken as labourer to work in Tea garden during British Rule.

=== Official status ===
Historically, Nagpuri was the lingua-franca in the region. It was the court language during the reign of the Nagvanshi dynasty. Nagpuri is accorded as an additional official language in the Indian state of Jharkhand. There is demand to include Nagpuri in the Eighth schedule. Some academics oppose inclusion of Hindi dialects in the Eighth Schedule of the Constitution as full-fledged Indian languages. According to them, recognition of Hindi dialects as separate languages would deprive Hindi of millions of its speakers and eventually no Hindi will be left.

== Phonology ==
=== Consonants ===
		Labial	Dental/ Alveolar	Retroflex	Post-alv./ Palatal	Velar	Glottal
Nasal		m	n	(ɳ)		ŋ	
Stop/ Affricate	voiceless	p	t	ʈ	tʃ	k	
Stop/ Affricate	aspirated	pʰ	tʰ	ʈʰ	tʃʰ	kʰ	
Stop/ Affricate	voiced	b	d	ɖ	dʒ	ɡ	
Stop/ Affricate	breathy	bʱ	dʱ	ɖʱ	dʒʱ	ɡʱ	
Fricative			s				h
Tap			ɾ				
Lateral			l				
Approximant		ʋ			j		

- [ɳ] occurs from Sanskrit loanwords, or as realisations of /n/.
- /h/ can be voiced as [ɦ] when between vowels.
- /ɖ, ɖʱ/ can be heard as taps [ɽ, ɽʱ] when in word-medial position.
- /ɾ/ can also be heard as retroflex [ɽ] when after back vowels.

=== Vowels ===
Oral vowel sounds
	Front	Central	Back	
High	i iː		ʊ ʊː	
Mid	ɛ ɛː	(ə əː)	ʌ ʌː	ɔ ɔː
Low	a aː			

Nasal vowel sounds
	Front	Central	Back	
High	ĩ		ʊ̃	
Mid	ɛ̃		ʌ̃	ɔ̃
Low	ã			

- /i/ can be heard as [i̞] or [ɪ], in short, closed, non-final syllables in free variation.
- /ɛ, ɛː/ can be heard as more close [e, eː] in free variation within word-final syllables.
- /a/ can be heard as front [a] or central [ä] in free variation.
- /ʌ, ʌː/ is heard as more rounded [ʌ̹, ʌ̹] when after bilabial consonants, as [ʌ̞] when in short syllables, and as [ə, əː] when the final syllable contains an /i/, or when following a /ɖ/ or /ɾ/.
- /ɔ, ɔː/ can be heard as [o, oː] in free variation.

Diphthongs
	Front	Central	Back	
High			ʊi̯	
Mid	ɛi̯, ɛʊ̯	[əɪ̯]	ʌɛ̯, ʌ̃ɛ̯̃, ʌi̯, ʌʊ̯	ɔɛ̯, ɔ̃ɛ̯̃, ɔi̯, ɔ̃ĩ̯
Low	aɛ̯, ãɛ̯̃, aɪ̯, aʊ̯, ãʊ̯̃			

- [əɪ̯] is a realisation of /ʌi̯/.

== Vocabulary ==
=== Pronouns ===
			Singular	Plural
1st person			moẽ	hʌmre
2nd person		Honorific	ʌpne	ʌpne=mʌn
2nd person		Polite	rʌure	rʌure=mʌn
2nd person		Familiar Polite	tohre	tohre=mʌn
2nd person		Familiar unmarked	tõe	tohre=mʌn
3rd person	Honorific	Proximal	i(=mʌn)	i=mʌn
3rd person	Honorific	Distal	u(=mʌn)	u=mʌn
3rd person	Unmarked	Proximal	i(=go)	i=mʌn
3rd person	Unmarked	Distal	u(=go)	u=mʌn

=== Similarities between words ===
There are similarities between the words of Nagpuri, Hindi, Apabhramsha, Prakrit and Sanskrit which are given in the table below.

Nagpuri	Hindi	Apabrahmsha	Prakrit	Sanskrit	English
Pachhe	Peechhe	Picchhu	Pachha	Pashcha	Behind
Beyir	Suraj	Beri	Rabi	Ravi	Sun
Sapna	Sapna	Supan	Suvan	Swapna	Dream
Dharam	Dharm	Dham	Dhamm	Dharma	Religion
Aayinkh	Aankh	Aankhi	Akiv	Akshi	Eyes
Didh	Dridh	Didh	Didh	Dridha	Firm

=== Tenses ===
Magadhi, Nagpuri and Jharkhand Prakrit use "la" in the past tense, "ta" in the present tense and "ma" in the future tense. The words are given below in the table.

Nagpuri	Hindi	English
Gelon	gaya	went
Sutlon	soya	slept
Jaglon	jaga	awake
Peelon	piya	drank
Khalon	khaya	ate
Jathon	Ja raha hoon	I am going
Sutothon	so raha hoon	I am sleeping.
Piyothon	Pee raha hoon	I am drinking.
Khathon	Kha raha hoon	I am eating
Jamu	jaoonga	I will go.
Sutmu	sounga	I will sleep
Pimu	Piyunga	I will drink.
Khamu	Khaoonga	I will eat.

=== Relationship ===
Below are some words about relationships in Nagpuri in the table.

Nagpuri	Hindi	English
Mae, Aayo	Ma	Mother
Baap, Abba	Pita	Father
Badi	Pardadi	Great grandmother
Kaka	Kaka	Father's younger brother
Didi	Didi	Elder sister
Bhai	Bhai	Brother
Bahin	Bahen	sister
Puth	Putra	Son
Nani	Nani	Maternal grandmother
Jani	Mahila	woman
Sayis	Saas	Mother- in - law
Sangat/Yaar		brother of sister-in-law and brother-in-law
Sangatin		sister of sister-in-law and brother-in-law

=== Words ===
Below are some words of daily use in Nagpuri, Hindi and English in the table.

Nagpuri	Hindi	English
Charka	Sweth	White
Gola	Bhura	Brown
Peeyar	Peela	Yellow
Laal	Laal	Red
Neel	Neela	Blue
Aayij	Aaj	Today
Aekhane	Abhi	Now
Sagar din	Sara din	Whole night
Adhberiya	Dopahar	Afternoon
Sanjh	Sam/Sanjh/Sandhya	Evening
Thanv	Jagah/Sthan	Place
Pokhra	Pokhar	Pond
Pethiya	Bazar	Market
Pahad	Pahad	Mountain
Nadi	Nadi	River
Masna	Masan/Samsaan	Graveyard
Jaad	Jaada	Winter
Barkha	Barsa	Rainy season
Rait	Raat	Night
Paala	Paala	Snow

== Dialects ==
The Nagpuri language spoken in different districts such as Ranchi, Gumla, Simdega and Garhwa varies with each other.

== Script ==
The early inscriptions found in the region are in Brahmi script. The Saridkel Brahmi Inscription from Khunti district is from 3rd century BCE. Several inscriptions of forts, temples and land grants are found from the 10th century, such as from Mahamaya temple of Hapamuni built by Gajghat Rai, Nagfeni, Navratangarh fort of Gumla district, Boreya and Jagannath temple of Ranchi. Some Buddhist inscriptions are undated, such as from Khalari and Jonha Falls. Inscriptions of the modern period are in Devnagari script. Nagpuri poetry has been written in Devnagari and Kaithi script during the 17th century. At present, mainly Devnagari script is used in literature.

== Literature ==
The Nagpuri language is rich in folk tales, folk songs and riddles. Literature in the Nagpuri language are available since the 17th century. The Nagvanshi king Raghunath Shah is first known poet of Nagpuri language. These poems were composed in Devnagari script and Kaithi script. Some Nagpuri peots were Hanuman Singh, Jaigovind Mishra, Barju Ram Pathak, Ghasi Ram Mahli, Das Mahli, Mahant Ghasi and Kanchan. "Nagvanshavali" (1876), written by Beniram Mehta, is a historical work in the nagpuri language. The poet Ghasi Ram Mahli wrote several works, including "Nagvanashavali", "Durgasaptasati", "Barahamasa", "Vivha Parichhan" etc. There were also great writers like Pradumn Das and Rudra Singh. It is believed that prose writing in the nagpuri language started by Christian missionaries. E.H.Whitley wrote Notes on the Ganwari dialect of Lohardaga, Chhota Nagpur in 1896, which considered the start of writing prose in the nagpuri language. Some Nagpuri language writers and poets in the modern period are Praful Kumar Rai, Sahani Upendra Pal Singh, Shiv Avtar Choudhary, Lal Ranvijay Nath Shahdeo, Bisheshwar Prasad Keshari and Girdhari Ram Gonjhu.

Monthly Nagpuri magazines Gotiya and Johar Sahiya have been published in Ranchi. Several magazines have also been published in Assam, West Bengal's Tarai and Dooars districts.

=== Author and Work ===
Some poets, writers and their works in the nagpuri language are as follows:

Author	Work
Raghunath Shah	first known poet in the Nagpuri language, mostly composed devotional poetry on Krishna
Beniram Mahata	Nagvanshavali (1876)
Ghasi Ram Mahli	Nagpuri Fag Satak, Lalana Ranjana, Durga Saptasati, Nagvanshavali Jhumar
Kanchan	Sudama Charitra, Krishna Charitra, Mahabharat, Lanka Kand, Usha Haran
Drugpal Ram Deogharia	Nal Charita, Korambe Upakhyan
Dhaniram Bakshi	Jitiya Kahani, Fogli budhia kar Kahani, Narad Moh Lila, Karam Mahatmay, Sri Krishna Charit
E.H Whitley	Notes on Ganwari dialects of Lohardaga, Chotanagpur (grammar), 1896
Konrad Bookout	Grammar of the Nagpuria Sadani language
Praful Kumar Rai	Son Jhair (collection of stories), 1967
Sahani Upendra Pal Singh	Mewar Keshri, Amba Manjar
Bisheshwar Prasad Keshari	Nerua Lota urf Sanskritit Abdharna (nibandh), Thakur Vishwanath Sahi, Kanti
Shravan Kumar Goswami	Nagpuri Vyakran, Seva aur Nokri, Teteir Kar Chhaon, Du Dair Bis Phool
Girdhari Ram Gonjhu	Mahabali Radhe Kar Balidan, Akhra Nindaye Gelak
Naimuddin Mirdaha	Menjur Painkh
Baraik Iswari Prasad Singh	Kaka kar Kahani
Kali Kumar Suman	Khukhri Rugda
Shakuntala Mishra	Nagpuri Sadani Vyakaran, Sadani Nagpuri-Hindi Sabdkosh, Sato Nadi Par

|- | Bhuneshwar Anuj || Nagpuri Lok Sahitya , Atit ke Darpan me Jharkhand , Chotanagpur ke Prachin Smarak, Jharkhand ke sahid, Shital Bund, Nagpuri aur Uska Lokmanas, Nagpuri Lok katha Sahitya, Nagpuri Padhya lok Sahitya, |}

=== Education ===
Nagpuri taught at some high schools as a subject in Jharkhand. It is also taught at Ranchi University, Dr. Shyama Prasad Mukherjee University, Ranchi Women's College, Ram Lakhan Singh Yadav College, Doranda College, Simdega College and other universities of Jharkhand.

== Sample phrases ==
English	Nagpuri	Nagpuri (Devanagari)
What is your name?	Tor naam ka heke?	तोर नाम का हेके ?
How are you ?	Toen kaisan aahis?	तोयं कईसन आहीस्?
How are you ?	Roure kaisan ahi	रउरे कईसन आही?
How are you ?	Apne kaisan ahi (respect)	आपने कईसन आही?
I am fine.	Moen thik aahon	मोएं ठीक आहों।
What?	Ka?	का?
Who?	Ke?	के?
Why?	Kale?	काले?
How?	Kaisan?	कसैन?
Which?	Kon?	कोन?
Come here.	Hian aao	हीयां आओ
I am going to home.	Moen ghar jat hon	मोएं घर जात हों।
I have eaten.	Moen kha hon	मोएं खा हों।
I will go.	Moen Jamu	मोएं जामु।
We go.	Hame jaeil	हामे जाइल।
You go.	Toen jais	तोयं जाइस्।
You are writing.	Toen likhathis	तोयं लिखतहिस्।
You will come.	Toen aabe	तोयं आबे।
We are writing.	Hame likhathi	हामे लीखतही।
We have written.	Hame likh hi	हामे लीख ही।
He/She come.	Oo aawela	उ आवेला।
He/She is going.	Oo jat he	उ जात हे।
He/She was coming.	Oo aawat rahe	उ आवत रहे।
He/She will play.	Oo kheli	उ खेली।
They have eaten bread.	Ooman roti kha haen	उमन रोटी खा हयं।
They went.	Ooman gelaen	उमन गेलयं।
They will go home.	Ooman ghar jabaen	उमन घर जाबयं।

== See also ==
- Nagpuri culture
- Nagpuri cinema
