= Gajghat Rai =

- Raja
- Reign: 10th century CE
- Predecessor: Gajdant Rai
- Successor: Chandan Rai
- Dynasty: Nagvanshi
- Religion: Hinduism

Gajghat Rai was Nagvanshi king in 10th century. He succeeded Gajdant Rai.

According to Sanskrit inscription in Hapamuni village in Gumla district, he constructed Mahamaya temple in Vikram samvat 965 (908 CE) with the son of King Mohan Rai. He handed over the temple to Rashtrakuta Brahmin Shianath Dev. Later Vishnu idol was established by Shivdas Karn in Vikram Samvat 1458 (1401 CE) according to an inscription in sanskrit.

Sri Chaitanya visited the village during his return journey from Puri to Varanasi in 16th century. Original mahamaya temple was destroyed by tribal insurgent during kol rebellion (1931-1933). They also killed the wife and children of the caretaker of temple Barju Ram Pathak. He has described the incident in his nagpuri poems.
