= Lal Ranvijay Nath Shahdeo =

Indian lawyer, poet and writer (1940–2019)

- Born: Lal Ranvijay Nath Shahdeo; 5 February 1940; Lalgarh (Palkot), Ranchi district, Chota Nagpur Division, Bihar Province (now Jharkhand), India
- Died: 18 March 2019 (aged 79); Ranchi, Jharkhand
- Education: Ranchi University; Chotanagpur Law College
- Occupations: Lawyer, Poet, writer, political activist
- Children: Dr Lal Ajay Nath Shahdeo (son)
- Parent: Maharaj Kumar Chhotlal Laxminath Shahdeo(father)
- Relatives: Giriraj Nath Shahdeo(grandson), Rituraj Nath Shahdeo(grandson)
- Awards: Praful Samman (2014); Nagpuri Sansthan Swarn Samman (2014); Durdarshan Samman (2011); Swarn Samman; Honour by Jharkhand Vidhan Sabha (2017); Jharkhand Ratna; Sher-e-Jharkhand honour

Lal Ranvijay Nath Shahdeo (5 February 1940 – 18 March 2019), was a lawyer, poet, writer and political activist. He was a prominent leader of the movement for a separate Jharkhand state. He was president of the Jharkhand Party. He wrote several Nagpuri poems, songs and slogans for the Jharkhand movement. At the end, the Central government of India accepted to form a new state, Jharkhand. He changed the state name Vananchal to Jharkhand after a debate with Prime minister Atal Bihari Vajpayee. He was the recipient of the Jharkhand Ratna Award for his contribution to the movement for a separate state of Jharkhand.

== Life ==
=== Early life ===
Lal Ranvijay Nath Shahdeo was born on 5 February 1940 in Lalgarh in Ranchi district in Bihar Province (now Jharkhand) to the Palkot Nagvanshi royal family. He was the son of Chhotelal Laxminath Shahdeo. He received his early education at home and teachers taught him Hindi, Sanskrit and English. His mother tongue was Nagpuri. He learnt the traditional nagpuri song from his father during his childhood.

He completed his M.A in Political Science and History at Ranchi University. He studied Law at Chotanagpur Law College. During his studies, he came in contact with writer Radhakrishna and political leader Jaipal Singh Munda.

=== Career ===
He was a lawyer for four decades. He was a nagpuri poet, story writer also a singer.

He joined the Jharkhand Party in 1957 and was a close associate of Jaipal Singh Munda. When Jaipal Singh Munda merged the Jharkhand Party with Congress on 20 June 1963, Lal Ranvijay did not support him and kept alive the Jharkhand Party. He was the president of Jharkhand Party. He give the slogan Jaipal, Bodra, Bage, Murga le ke Bhage which was popular during the Jharkhand movement. He wrote the Nagpuri poems and slogans for movement for a separate state of Jharkhand. He had a prominent role in the start of studies in the tribal and reignal languages in Ranchi University. He changed the state name Vananchal to Jharkhand though a debate with Prime minister Atal Bihari Vajpayee. He was president of Jharkhand Party till his death.

=== Death ===
He died on 28 March 2019 in raja dera in Ranchi.

== Works ==
Lal Ranvijay was a poet and singer. He translated Bhagwat Gita in nagpuri. He was also editor of several books and magazines. He was known for Vir and Sringar ras poems. He composed around 350 nagpuri songs and poems. Some of his prominent works are:

- Mati mange lahu
- Barndo
- Purab kar ranf(drama)
- Piyasal
- Atma
- Aur shahnai baij uthlak
- Darad
- Manpuran(story)
- Kundri kar larange
- Admiman aur admiyat
- Chotanagpur kar gaon me
- Ekta(essay)
- Jagi jawan chamki bijuri(collection of poem)
- Puja kar Phul(collection of bhakti songs)
- Khotha(collection of songs)

== Awards and honours ==
In 2015, the Government of Jharkhand awarded him the Jharkhand Ratna Award for his contribution to the movement for a separate Jharkhand state by writing inspiring poems, songs and for his speeches. He was also awarded by Jharkhand Vidhan Sabha in 2017 and achieved the title of sher-e-jharkhand.
