= Sahani Upendra Pal Singh =

Indian Nagpuri-language writer (b. 1930, d. 2021)

- Born: 15 October 1930; Taragutu, Gumla district, British India
- Died: 29 July 2021 (aged 90); Gokul Nagar, Gumla
- Education: Higher Secondary
- Occupations: Farmer; Writer
- Spouse: Smt. Chandrabali Devi
- Relatives: Birendra Pal Singh (father); Janak Nandini (mother)
- Writing career
- Pen name: Nahan
- Language: Nagpuri
- Notable works: Mewar Keshri; Amba Manjar
- Notable awards: Jharkhand Ratna; Praful Samman; Seva Ratna; BCCL Koyal Bharti Rajbhasha award

Sahani Upendra Pal Singh (15 October 1930 - 29 July 2021) was an Indian writer. He was one of the prominent writers in the Nagpuri-language in the modern period. He translated "Ram Charit Manas" in Nagpuri. He wrote around 20 books in nagpuri. He was awarded "Jharkhand Ratna", "Praful Samman", "Seva Ratna" and "BCCL Koyal Bharti Rajbhasha award".

== Life ==
=== Early life ===
He was born in Taragutu village in Gumla District to Birendra Pal Singh and Janak Nandini on 15 October 1930. He was from a Jamindar family. He completed his high school at Gumla High school in 1952. He was not able to pursue higher Studies due to family issues.

=== Personal life ===
He married Chandrabali Devi in 1950. He had two daughters and four sons.

=== Works ===
Singh wrote more than 20 books in nagpuri. He translated "Ram Charit Manas" and poems by Kali Das in Nagpuri. His written book "Mewar Keshri" is taught in the Nagpuri B.A honours course. He wrote a book named "Amba Manjar" in 2006 which was about the culture of Jharkhand and India.

=== Death ===
He died on 29 July 2021 in his residence, Gokul Nagar, Gumla.

== Awards ==
He was awarded the Jharkhand Ratna, Hirak Samman, Praful Samman, Seva Ratna and BCCL Koyal Bharti Rajbhasha award.
