= Girdhari Ram Gonjhu =

Scholar of the Nagpuri language (1949–2021)

- Born: 5 December 1949; Belwadag, Ranchi district, Bihar (now Khunti district, Jharkhand)
- Died: 15 April 2021 (aged 81); Ranchi, India
- Citizenship: India
- Education: M.A, B.Ed, LLB, PhD
- Occupations: Professor, writer, scholar
- Spouse: Smt. Saraswati Devi
- Relatives: Indranath Gonjhu (Father); Smt. Lalmani Devi (Mother)
- Writing career
- Language: Hindi; Nagpuri
- Period: 1975 - 2019
- Notable works: Jharkhand ki Sanskritik Virasat; Nagpuri ke Prachin Kavi; Jharkhand ke lokgeet; Jharkhand ke Badhya yantra; Sadani Nagpuri Vyakaran; Nagpuri Sabdkosh; Matrubhasha ki Bhumika
- Notable awards: Padma Shri (2022); Jharkhand Ratna

Girdhari Ram Gonjhu (5 December 1949 – 15 April 2021) was a prominent scholar of the Nagpuri language. He was former chairman of the Tribal-Regional Language Department at Ranchi University in state of Jharkhand. He was awarded Padma Shri for his contribution in the field of literature and education in the Jharkhand posthumously in 2022.

== Life ==
=== Early life ===
Girdhari Ram Gonjhu was born in Belwadag in Khunti district in Bihar (now Jharkhand) on 5 December 1949 to Indranath Gonjhu and Lalmani Devi. He completed M.A, B.Ed., LLB and PhD. He married Saraswati Devi.

=== Career ===
Gonjhu started his teaching career as a professor at Parambir Albert Ekka Memorial College in Chainpur, Gumla in 1975. Then he was professor at Gossner College Ranchi in 1978. Then he was professor of Ranchi College and Ranchi University. He was head of the department of tribal and regional language department at Ranchi University. He had written more than 25 books including Jharkhand ki Sanskritik Virasat, Nagpuri ke Prachin Kavi, Jharkhand ke lokgeet, Jharkhand ke Badhya yantra, Sadani Nagpuri Vyakaran, Nagpuri Sabdkosh, Matrubhasha ki Bhumika, Khukhda-Rugdi, Ritu ke Rang Mandar ke Sang, Mahabali Radhe Kar Balidan, Jharkhand ka Amar Putra: Marang Gomke Jaipal Singh Munda, Maharaja Madra Munda and Akhra Nindaye Gelak etc.

=== Last days and Death ===
He retired from Ranchi University and staying in Ranchi. He died on 15 April 2021 due to breathing problems in RIMS, Ranchi.

== Awards ==
He was awarded Padma Shri for his contribution in the field of literature and education in Jharkhand posthumously in 2022. Earlier he was awarded the "Jharkhand Ratna" award by the government of Jharkhand.
