= Bisheshwar Prasad Keshari =

Indian educationist and writer

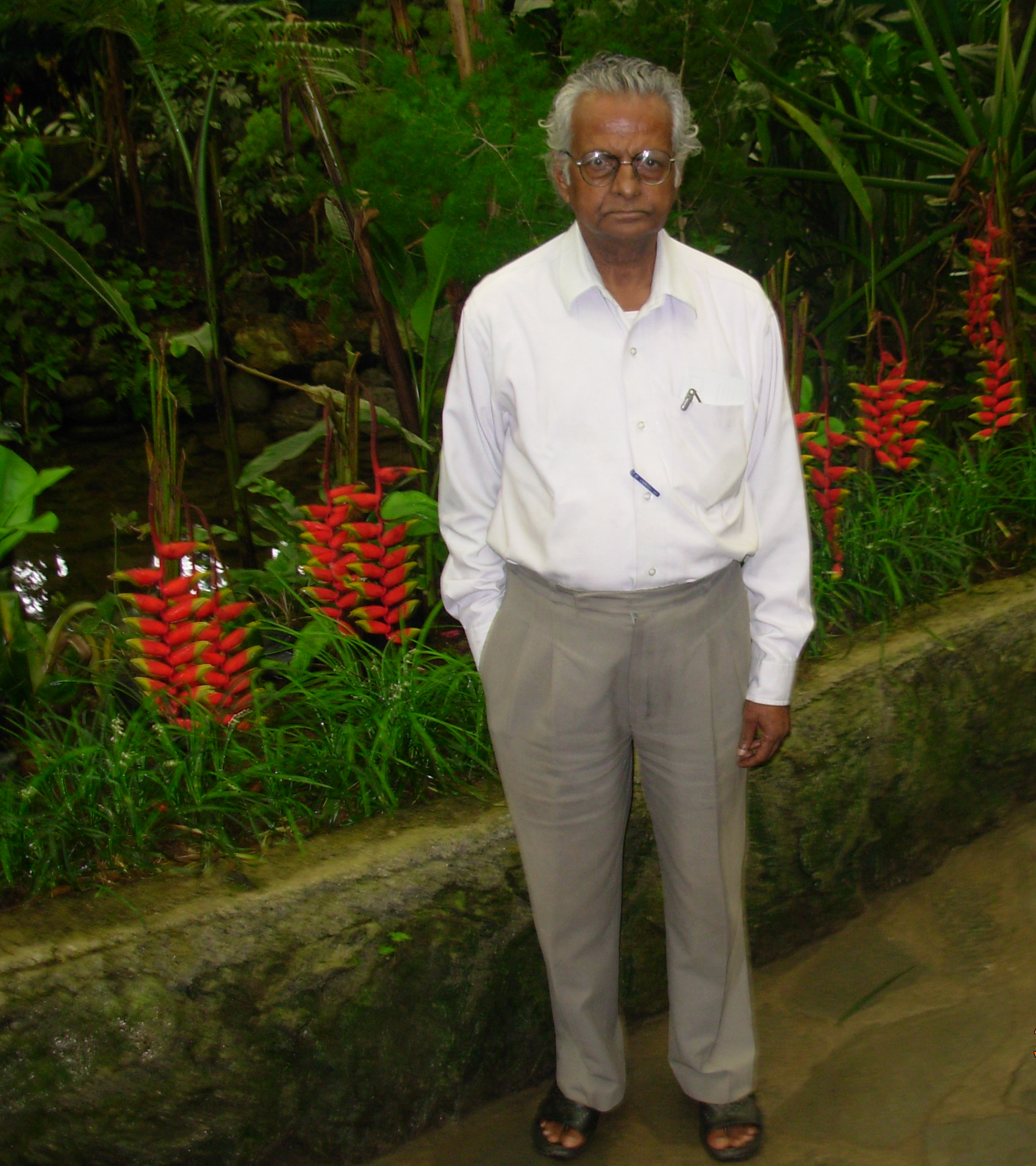
- Bisheshwar Prasad Keshari
- Born: 1 July 1933; Pithoria, Ranchi district, Bihar and Orissa Province (now Jharkhand), British India
- Died: 14 August 2016 (aged 83)
- Citizenship: India
- Education: M.A, Ph.D.
- Alma mater: Ranchi University
- Occupations: Professor, Writer, Scholar
- Spouse: Smt. Shanti Keshari
- Children: Dr. Sabita Keshari (daughter), Dr. Sanjay Kumar Keshari (son) and Dr. Seema Keshari (daughter)
- Relatives: Sri Shivnarayan Sahu (father); Smt. Lagan Devi (mother)
- Writing career
- Language: Hindi; Nagpuri
- Notable works: Nagpuri bhasa aur Sahitya; Sahitya ke tatwa aur ayam; Jharkhandi bhasaon ki samasyaen aur Sambhabnaen; Chotanagpur ka Itihas; Jharkhand Andolan ki Bastabikta; Thakur Vishwanath Sahi; Charitra Nirman; Jharkhand ke Sadan; Om Vishwavidyalaya Namah; Kavi Ratna Sarda Prasad Sharma:ek antarang Aklan; Nagpuri geeton me shringar ras; Cultural Jharkhand; Nagpuri Lokgeet Bruhat Sangrah; Nagpuri kavi aur Unka Kavya
- Notable awards: Vikramshila Vidyapeeth; Vidya Sagar (1982) by Bhagalpur University; Jharkhand Ratna(1999) by Lok Seva Samiti; Bhartendu Harishchandra Samman(2003); Jharkhand Gaurab Samman (2009); Rajbhasa Samman(2010); Ranchi Doordarshan Kendra Samman(2010); Lifetime achievement award by government of Jharkhand (2011-12)
- Movement: Jharkhand movement

Bisheshwar Prasad Keshari, popularly known as Dr BP Keshari, was an educationist and writer. He was a prominent leader in the movement for a separate state, Jharkhand.

== Life ==
=== Early life ===
Bisheshwar Prasad Keshari was born in Pithoria in Ranchi district in Bihar and Orissa Province on 1 July 1933 to Shivnarayan Sahu and Lagan Devi in a Kesarwani family. He completed the M.A and PhD from Ranchi University. According to him, when he was in intermediate of Ranchi College, he attained wedding of relatives in Pithoria. When he heard the nagpuri song sung by women, he was astounded at the depth of meaning and decided to collect unpublished nagpuri songs.

=== Career ===
He started his career as an assistant professor in Daltonganj in 1957. He established the Tribal and Regional language department at Ranchi University along with Ram Dayal Munda in the 1980s. He was professor in the Tribal and regional language department. He was a prominent leader in the movement for a separate state, Jharkhand. He was a member of the "Jharkhand coordinator committee" along with Ram Dayal Munda and Binod Bihari Mahato in 1989, which was instrumental in coordination between various fractions of the Jharkhand movement. JCC sent a memorandum to form the Jharkhand state in 1988. As a result, Central government formed a committee on the Jharkhand matter in 1989. It stressed the need of greater allocation of the development funds for the area and The Jharkhand Area Autonomous Council formed in 1994 which regulated in the areas of agriculture, rural health, public work, public health and minerals.

He established "Nagpuri Sansthan" on 17 February 2002 with his wife Shanti Keshri in Pithoria. In the library of Nagpuri Sansthan, there are 520 books in tribal and regional languages, 515 books and 192 magazines of English literature, 1556 books of Hindi literature and 3392 magazines in Nagpuri. Also, there are 117 poems of 67 poets of the Nagpuri language, biographies of 645 Nagpuri poets and 35000 poems and 4000 folk songs composed by them.

=== Last days and death ===
He was suffering from pneumonia. He died in Ranchi at the age of 83. His cremation was performed with the state honour in Pithoria and attended by minister Chandra Prakash Choudhary, Sudesh Mahto, women's commission chairman Mahua Maji and associates from AJSU Party, Surya Singh Besra and Deo Sharan Bhagat.

== Work ==
Dr. BP Keshri wrote several books. Some are the following:

- Nagpuri bhasa aur Sahitya
- Sahitya ke tatwa aur ayam
- Jharkhandi bhasaon ki samasyaen aur Sambhabnaen
- Chotanagpur ka Itihas
- Jharkhand Andolan ki Bastabikta
- Charitra Nirman
- Jharkhand ke Sadan
- Main Jharkhand me hoon
- Om Vishwavidyalaya Namah
- Kavi Ratna Sarda Prasad Sharma:ek antarang Aklan
- Nagpuri geeton me shringar ras
- Sirf Solah safe
- Sos sare safe
- Satyacharn
- Thakur Vishwanath Sahi
- Nerua lota urf sanskritik awdharna
- Cultural Jharkhand
- Problem and Prospects
- Nagpuri bhasa udgam aur Vikas
- Jharkhand ke Itihar ki kuchh jaruri baten
- Radio le dutho (Nagpuri Natak)
- Nagpuri Lokgeet Bruhat Sangrah
- Nagpuri kavi aur Unka Kavya

== Awards and recognition ==
- Vikramshila Vidyapeeth
- Vidya Sagar (1982) by Bhagalpur University
- Jharkhand Ratna (1999) by Lok Seva Samiti
- Bhartendu Harishchandra Samman (2003)
- Jharkhand Gaurab Samman (2009)
- Rajbhasa Samman (2010)
- Ranchi Doordarshan Kendra Samman (2010)
- Lifetime achievement award by government of Jharkhand (2011–12)
- Akhara Samman (2013)
- Brajendra Mohan Chakraborty Sahitya Samman (2014)
