= Rautia =

Social group of East India

Rautia/Routia
- Religions: Folk Hinduism Rautia is a Hindu Caste Community and Kshatriya Varna by its origin, their Culture is Sadani
- Languages: Native language – Nagpuri/Sadri; Secondary language – Hindi, Odia, Bengali
- Country: India
- Original state: Jharkhand, Chhattisgarh, Bihar, Odisha

The Rautia/Routia is a Hindu Caste community and Kshatriya Varna by its origin. The Rautia Caste is an upper caste in its Sadan ethnic community and because of being a Sadan caste, the mother tongue culture is Sadani which is known as Nagpuri or Sadri found in the states of Jharkhand, Bihar, Chhattisgarh Odisha, Assam and Bengal in India. The presence of Rautia caste is also seen in countries like Nepal and Bangladesh.

== History ==
In 1812 Jagirdar Bakhtar Say along with Parganait Mundal Singh rebelled against excessive tax imposition.

During British colonial rule, some Rautia populations migrated from their native state to Assam, Bengal, and Nepal seeking employment in tea gardens and became the natives of these states.

== Present circumstances ==
The community has several clans. Marriage is forbidden within same clan and allowed within different clans.

== Official classification ==
Rautia are included in list of Other Backward Class in Jharkhand, Chhattisgarh and Odisha.

In 2016, The Dr Ram Dayal Munda Tribal Research Institute recommended inclusion of Rautia caste in Scheduled Tribe list. According to TRI, Rautia have primitive features and distinctive culture, and are backward in social, educational and economical aspects. The Government of Jharkhand sent the proposal to the Ministry of Tribal Affairs, Government of India.
