= List of people from Jharkhand =

This is a list of some of the notable people either born or brought up in Jharkhand state, India.

== Award winners ==
=== Padma Bhushan ===
- Sailesh Kumar Bandopadhyay - 2010, Social Activist, Gandhian
- Mahendra Singh Dhoni - 2018, Indian international cricketer who captained the Indian national team in limited-overs formats from 2007 to 2016 and in Test cricket from 2008 to 2014.
- Kariya Munda - 2019, Indian politician and the former Deputy Speaker of the 15th Lok Sabha

=== Padma Shri ===
- Shashadhar Acharya - 2020, Chhau dancer
- Premlata Agarwal - 2013
- Ashok Bhagat - 2015, social worker and secretary of Vikas Bharti
- Makar Dhwaja Darogha - 2011, Chhau Dancer
- Mahendra Singh Dhoni - 2009, Indian international cricketer
- Pandit Gopal Prasad Dubey - 2012, Chhau dancer and choreographer
- Balbir Dutt - 2017, journalist
- Girdhari Ram Gonjhu - 2022, Literature
- Chutni Devi - 2021, social worker
- Digamber Hansda - 2018
- Madhu Mansuri Hasmukh - 2020, folk singer
- Bulu Imam - 2019, activist
- Deepika Kumari - 2016, sports, archery
- Vasundhara Komkali - 2006, classical musician
- Mukund Nayak - 2017, folk singer
- Parasu Ram Mishra
- Ram Dayal Munda - 2010, Indian scholar and regional music exponent
- Simon Oraon - 2016, Indian environmentalist and social worker
- Shyama Charan Pati - 2006, Chhau Dancer
- Kedar Nath Sahoo - 2005, classical dancer
- Jamuna Tudu - 2019, environmental activist

=== Sangeet Natak Akademi Award ===
- Chetan Joshi, flautist
- Mahavir Nayak, nagpuri folk singer
- Mukund Nayak, folk artist

=== Jharkhand Gaurav Samman ===
- Lal Vijay Shahdeo - 2019, film director, producer and writer

=== Nari Shakti Puraskar ===
- Chami Murmu - 2019, environmental activist
- Dr. Bharti Kashyap - 2017, vision and safe motherhood intervention

== Academics ==
- Bhuneshwar Anuj, scholar
- Gerald Durrell - naturalist, zookeeper, conservationist, author and television presenter; born in Jamshedpur in 1925
- Girdhari Ram Gonjhu - Literature and Scholar
- Shravan Kumar Goswami, Professor and Scholar
- Bisheshwar Prasad Keshari - educationist, writer, scholar
- Shakuntala Mishra, Professor and writer
- Ram Dayal Munda - former Vice-Chancellor of Ranchi University
- Ram Krishna Singh - teacher of English language skills and Indian writing in English at Indian School of Mines, Dhanbad since 1976

== Authors ==
- Miniya Chatterji - author
- Pankaj Dubey - author
- Aditi Gupta - author
- Bulu Imam - environmentalist, writer
- Shiv Khera - author, motivational speaker, activist
- Praful Kumar Rai - writer
- Nikita Singh - author
- Sahani Upendra Pal Singh - writer
- Khagendra Thakur
- Kamini Roy - poet
- Subodh Ghosh - author

== Bureaucrats ==
- Subodh Kumar Jaiswal - Director of CBI (Central Bureau of Investigation)
- Rajeev Topno - Private Secretary to the Prime Minister of India Narendra Modi; former Director of Prime Minister's office (PMO), New Delhi

== Business and industry ==
- Anurag Dikshit - born in Dhanbad, ranked 207 by Forbes among the world's richest people in 2006
- Atul Kochhar - Indian-born, British based chef, restaurateur, and television personality
- Mahesh Poddar - industrialist

== Cinema and theatre ==
=== Actors ===
- Krishna Bharadwaj (actor) - born in Ranchi
- Bibhu Bhattacharya - born in Jharia
- Meiyang Chang - born in Dhanbad
- Dipankar De - born in Jamshedpur
- Dinesh Deva - dancer and actor
- Adarsh Gourav - born in Jamshedpur
- Raman Gupta - actor and dancer
- Rajesh Jais - born in Ranchi
- Sanjeev Jaiswal - born in Jamshedpur
- Deepak Lohar, actor
- R. Madhavan - born in Jamshedpur
- Zeishan Quadri - actor and writer, born in Wasseypur
- Vikram Singh - actor and producer, born in Jamshedpur
- Imran Zahid - born in Bokaro

=== Actresses ===
- Pratyusha Banerjee - born in Jamshedpur
- Priyanka Chopra - Miss World 2000, actress, born in Jamshedpur
- Deeba - actress, born in Ranchi
- Rasika Duggal - actress, born in Jamshedpur
- Ishita Dutta - younger sister of Tanushree Dutta, born in Jamshedpur
- Tanushree Dutta - Miss India 2004, actress, born in Jamshedpur
- Auritra Ghosh - actress, born in Jamshedpur
- Komal Jha - actress, born in Ranchi
- Shweta Prasad - actress, born in Jamshedpur
- Amrita Raichand - actress, born in Dhanbad
- Anushka Sen, actress, born in Ranchi
- Meenakshi Seshadri - Miss India 1981, born in Sindri
- Eenu Shree - actress, born in Jamshedpur
- Alisha Singh - actress, dancer and choreographer, born in Ranchi
- Pooja Singh - born in Jamshedpur
- Reecha Sinha - actress, born in Hazaribagh
- Simone Singh - born in Jamshedpur
- Supriya Kumari, actress
- Sumann - born in Jamshedpur
- Tania - Punjabi actress, born in Jamshedpur

=== Cinematographer / Choreographers ===
- Aseem Mishra - cinematographer, born in Dhanbad
- Alisha Singh - choreographer and actor, born in Ranchi

=== Directors / Producers ===
- Imtiaz Ali - director and writer, Jamshedpur
- Amit Bose - director, born in Jamshedpur
- Sriram Dalton - director, born in Daltonganj
- Raj Kumar Gupta - director, born in Hazaribag
- Sanjivan Lal - director and writer, born in Jamshedpur
- Akashaditya Lama - director and scriptwriter based in Bollywood, born in Ranchi
- Prem Prakash Modi - director and writer, Dumka
- Shomu Mukherjee - director, writer and producer, born in Jamshedpur
- Lal Vijay Shahdeo - director, producer and writer based in Mumbai, born in Lohardaga
- Gul Bahar Singh - director, born in Pakur
- Biju Toppo - director and producer, born in Mahuadanr

=== Music / playback singers / Lyricist / Poet ===
- Rajdeep Chatterjee - singer
- Biswajit Roy Chowdhury - Hindustani classical musician and sarod player, Deoghar
- Payal Dev - playback singer
- Ronkini Gupta - playback singer, born in Jamshedpur
- Madhu Mansuri Hasmukh - folk singer, born in Ranchi
- Chetan Joshi - flautist in the Hindustani classical music, Jharia
- Govind Sharan Lohra - nagpuri folk singer
- Monica Mundu - playback singer, also acted in film M.S. Dhoni: The Untold Story
- Nandlal Nayak - music composer
- Shilpa Rao - singer, born in Jamshedpur
- Chandan Tiwari - folk singer, Bokaro

== Freedom fighters and revolutionaries ==
- Budhu Bhagat - freedom fighter
- Sheikh Bhikhari - freedom fighter in 1857 rebellion
- Telanga Kharia - freedom fighter
- Chanku Mahato- freedom fighter in Godda
- Dhananjay Mahato - freedom fighter
- Raghunath mahato - freedom fighter
- Tilka Majhi - freedom fighter
- Birsa Munda - freedom fighter and folk hero; belonged to the tribal group of Munda people
- Kanhu Murmu - leader of Santal revolt
- Sido Murmu - leader of Santal revolt
- Nilambar and Pitambar - freedom fighter
- Jagabandhu Patnaik - freedom fighter
- Pandey Ganpat Rai - freedom fighter in 1857 rebellion
- Bakhtar Say - freedom fighter, fought against British force in 1812
- Thakur Vishwanath Shahdeo - freedom fighter in 1857 rebellion
- Ganga Narayan Singh - leader of Bhumij revolt
- Mundal Singh - freedom fighter, fought against British force in 1812
- Raja Arjun Singh - freedom fighter in 1857 rebellion
- Ram Narayan Singh - freedom fighter
- Tikait Umrao Singh - freedom fighter in 1857 rebellion

== Journalism ==
- Bhuneshwar Anuj, editor
- Dayamani Barla - journalist in Hindi newspaper Prabhat Khabar
- Balbir Dutt - founder director and editor in chief of Hindi daily Deshpran.
- Anjana Om Kashyap - executive editor of the Hindi news channel Aaj Tak
- Subodh Ghosh - journalist in Bengali daily Anandabazar Patrika

== Jurists and Lawyers ==
- Binod Bihari Mahato - lawyer, politician, political activist
- Lal Pingley Nath Shahdeo - jurist and political activist
- Lal Ranvijay Nath Shahdeo - lawyer, writer, political activist

== Medical ==
- Bharti Kashyap - ophthalmologist
- Subhash Mukhopadhyay - created the world's second and India's first child using in-vitro fertilisation

== Gallantry Awards winner ==
- Rakesh Asthana - Indian police officer
- Albert Ekka - recipient of Param Vir Chakra
- Randhir Prasad Verma - recipient of Ashoka Chakra

== Poetry ==
- Anuj Lugun - won the prestigious Bharat Bhushan Agarwal Award in 2011 for the best poem in Hindi
- Ghasiram Mahli - Nagpuri poet
- Kamini Roy - Bengali poet
- Lal Ranvijay Nath Shahdeo - Nagpuri poet
- Raghunath Shah - Nagvanshi king and poet
- Dalel Singh, poet
- Ram Krishna Singh - published seventeen poetry collections in English

== Politics ==
=== Activist ===
- Arjun Munda
- Banna Gupta
- Salkhan Murmu - Indian socio-political activist
- Surya Singh Besra - politician and activist
- Binod Bihari Mahato - lawyer, politician, political activist
- Nirmal Mahto - political activist
- Teklal Mahto - politician
- Thakur Ji Pathak - Indian activist, politician, businessman, well-known leader of Jharkhand(bihar)
- Jaipal Singh Munda, hockey player and tribal leader
- Kunal Sarangi - politician
- Rudra Pratap Sarangi - politician and activist
- Lal Ranvijay Nath Shahdeo - lawyer, writer, political activist
- Shibu Soren - politician

=== Governors of other states ===
- Bhishma Narain Singh - Member of Namudag royal family and governor of Assam, Tamil Nadu, Pondicherry, Andaman and Nicobar Islands
- Rameshwar Thakur - Madhya Pradesh, Odisha, Karnataka, Andhra Pradesh

=== Chief Minister ===
- Bhagwat Jha Azad - Chief Minister of Bihar from 14 February 1988 to 10 March 1989; born at Kasba village at Mehrama in Godda district
- Raghubar Das - former chief minister of Jharkhand
- Bindeshwari Dubey - Chief Minister of Bihar from 12 March 1985 to 14 February 1988; was involved in a Trade Union Movement in Chotanagpur collieries and industries since 1944; played an important role in the nationalization of collieries in India, specially in Jharkhand; was 6 term MLA from Bermo constituency in Bokaro District and MP from Giridih in Jharkhand
- Binodanand Jha - Chief Minister of Bihar from February 1961 to October 1963
- Madhu Koda - former chief minister of Jharkhand
- Babulal Marandi - first Chief Minister of Jharkhand born in Giridih P.S Tisri P.O Chandouri
- Arjun Munda - born in Jamshedpur, Union Minister of Tribal Affairs, Government of India.
- Krishna Ballabh Sahay - ex-Chief Minister of Bihar
- Hemant Soren - current Chief Minister of Jharkhand
- Shibu Soren - former Chief Minister of Jharkhand
- Champai Soren - Former Chief Minister of Jharkhand

=== Cabinet minister ===
- Yadunath Baskey - Minister in Bihar government
- Satyanand Bhogta - minister of labour
- Sudesh Kumar Mahto - former deputy chief minister
- Arjun Munda - Minister of Tribal Affairs of India
- Kariya Munda - former speaker of Loksabha
- Vimla Pradhan - former tourism minister
- Dinesh Sarangi - first health minister Jharkhand
- Sanatan Sardar - Veteran tribal leader, former irrigation minister, Bihar and three-term MLA from Potka
- Subodh Kant Sahay - former cabinet minister, government of India
- Basant Narain Singh - cabinet minister in Bihar
- Jayant Sinha - aviation minister
- Yashwant Sinha - former Union Cabinet minister, Government of India

=== Other ===
- Lobin Hembrom - politician
- Ajoy Kumar - former Indian Police Service (IPS) officer; elected as the MP (Member of Parliament)
- Bidyut Baran Mahato - MP from Jamshedpur
- Shashank Manjari - member of Ramgarh Raj royal family and ex MLA from Dumri
- Kartik Oraon - former member of Parliament
- Sambit Patra - politician and spokesperson of the Bharatiya Janata Party
- Vijaya Raje - member of Ramgarh Raj royal family and ex MLA from Chatra
- Ravindra Kumar Ray - former member of Parliament
- Kunal Sarangi - politician
- Lal Chintamani Sharan Nath Shahdeo - last Nagvanshi king and MLA from Ranchi
- Kamakhya Narain Singh - King of Ramgarh Raj and politician

== Religion ==
- Thakur Anukulchandra
- Father Kamil Bulke
- Parshvanatha - twenty-third Tirthankara of Jainism
- Telesphore Toppo
- Dular Lakra

== Rulers ==
- Bairisal, Nagvanshi king in 16th century
- Udai Pratap Nath Shah Deo, Nagvanshi king in 20th century
- Bhim Karn, Nagvanshi king in 12th century
- Pratap Karn, Nagvanshi king in 15th century
- Shivdas Karn, Nagvanshi king in 14th century
- Gajghat Rai, Nagvanshi king in 9th century
- Phani Mukut Rai, first Nagvanshi king
- Medini Ray, King of Palamu in 17th century
- Durjan Shah, Nagvanshi king in 17th century
- Dripnath Shah, Nagvanshi king in 18th century
- Madhu Karn Shah, Nagvanshi king in 16th century
- Raghunath Shah, Nagvanshi king in 17th century
- Ram Shah, Nagvanshi king in 17th century
- Ani Nath Shahdeo, king of Barkagarh
- Lal Chintamani Sharan Nath Shahdeo, last Nagvanshi king
- Thakur Vishwanath Shahdeo, King of Barkagarh
- Baghdeo Singh, first king of Ramgarh Raj
- Dalel Singh, king of Ramgarh in 17th century
- Jagatpal Singh, king of Pithuriya
- Kamakhya Narain Singh, king of Ramgarh
- Mukund Singh, king of Ramgarh
- Raja Arjun Singh, King of Porahat
- Tikait Umrao Singh, king of Ormanjhi

== Social service ==
- Jyoti Dhawale - HIV activist
- Dr. Bharti Kashyap - vision and cervical cancer activist
- Ishwar Chandra Vidyasagar - 19th Century Indian educator and social reformer

== Sports ==
=== Archery ===
- Komalika Bari
- Mangal Singh Champia - Indian archer, who won multiple medals in several International event, including Asian Games.
- Deepika Kumari - Indian athlete who competes in archery status, currently ranked number 1 in the world.
- Madhumita Kumari - won the Silver Medal Asian Games 2018 in the Women's compound archery team event.
- Laxmirani Majhi
- Purnima Mahato - won the Indian national archery championships and a silver medal at the 1998 Commonwealth Games.

=== Boxing ===
- Anthresh Lalit Lakra - international boxer
- Aruna Mishra - 2004 world champion
- Diwakar Prasad - international boxer
- Birju Shah - international boxer
- Selay Soy - boxer

=== Cricket ===
- Varun Aaron
- Kirti Azad
- Rajesh Chauhan
- Kumar Deobrat
- Mahendra Singh Dhoni
- Ishank Jaggi
- Monu Kumar
- Kumar Kushagra
- Shahbaz Nadeem
- Shubhlakshmi Sharma - Indian female cricket player
- Pratyush Singh - made his first-class debut for Jharkhand in the 2016–17 Ranji Trophy on 20 October 2016.
- Randhir Singh
- Utkarsh Singh
- Virat Singh
- Saurabh Tiwary
- Rahul Tripathi
- Vikash Vishal
- Ishan Kishan

=== Association football ===
- Deepak Mondal - Indian professional footballer
- Sanjay Balmuchu - Indian footballer, plays as a midfielder for Churchill Brothers S.C. in the I-League; 2012 graduate of the Tata Football Academy
- Munmun Lugun - Indian footballer, plays as a defender for Pune in the I-League

=== Hockey ===
- Kanti Baa
- Sylvanus Dung Dung - former field hockey player from India
- Michael Kindo
- Sangita Kumari
- Bimal Lakra
- Birendra Lakra - born in Simdega
- Jaipal Singh Munda - captained the Indian field hockey team to win gold in the 1928 Summer Olympics in Amsterdam
- Nikki Pradhan
- Pushpa Pradhan
- Masira Surin
- Sumrai Tete
- Manohar Topno

=== Lawn bowls ===
- Lovely Choubey
- Rupa Rani Tirkey

=== Mountaineering ===
- Premlata Agarwal - mountain climber; on May 21, 2011, became the oldest Indian woman to summit Mount Everest, at age 45
- Binita Soren - mountain climber; on May 26, 2012, became the first tribal woman to summit Mount Everest, at age 25

== Others ==
- Rameesh Kailasam - governance reform and policy expert from India
- Swati Ghosh - contemporary artist
