= Kurukh people =

Indigenous (scheduled) tribe from India

Oraon
Kurukh
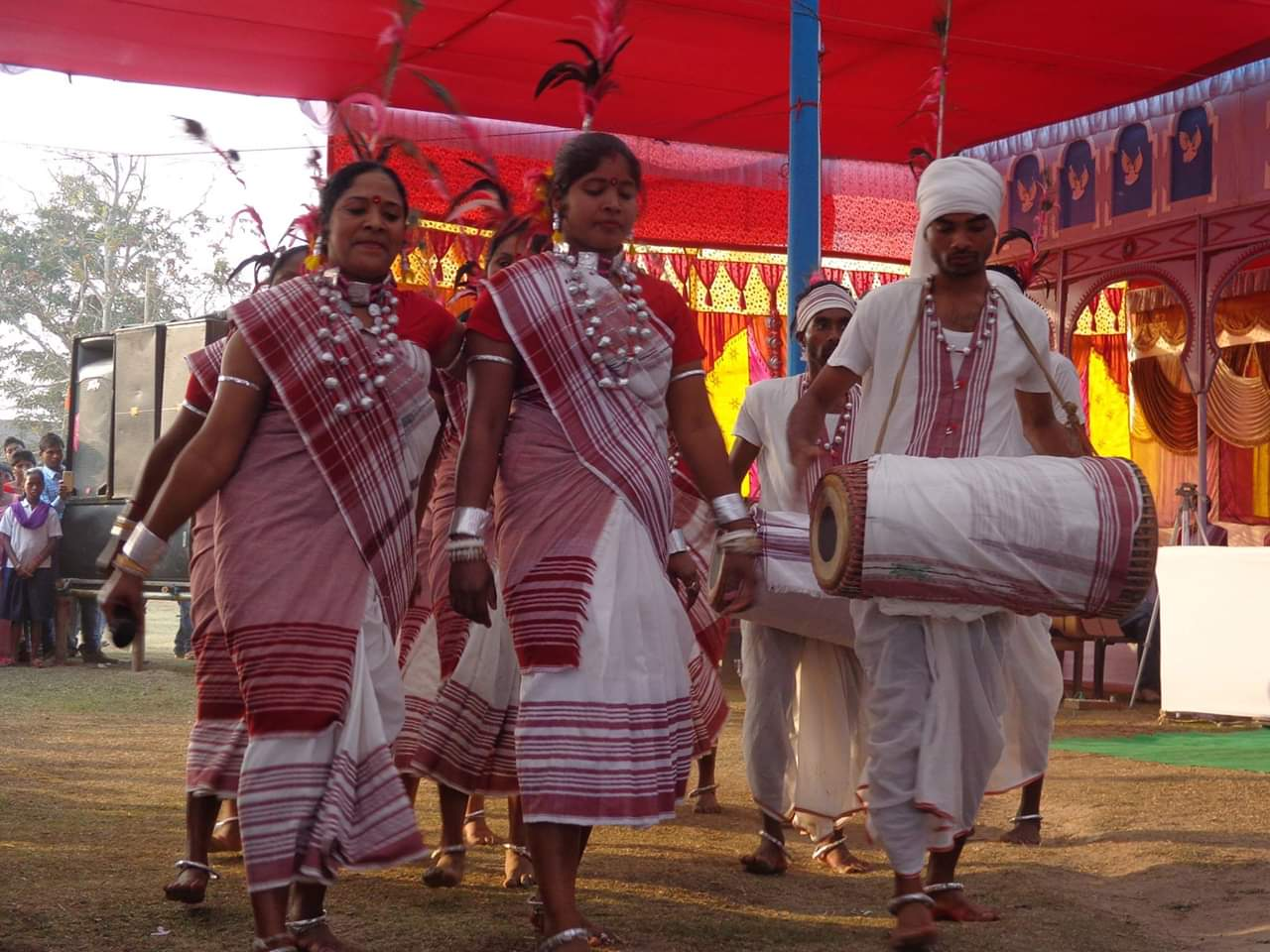
- Kurukh in traditional clothes performing dance

Total population
- 3.8 million (2011)

Regions with significant populations
- India: 3,696,899
- Jharkhand: 1,716,618
- Chhattisgarh: 748,739
- West Bengal: 643,510
- Odisha: 358,112
- Bihar: 144,472
- Assam: 39,739 (1921)
- Tripura: 12,011
- Bangladesh: 85,846
- Nepal: 37,424
- Bhutan: 4,200

Languages
- Kurukh • Sadri • Odia • Hindi • Bengali • Kera

Religion
- Hinduism; Christianity; Sarnaism

Related ethnic groups
- Malto people; other Dravidian peoples

Kurukh
- Person: Kūr̤uk͟hāḷ
- People: Kūr̤uk͟haṟ
- Language: Kūr̤uk͟h Kācchi
- Country: Kūr̤uk͟h Nāṛ

The Kurukh or Oraon (Kurukh: Karḵẖ and Oṛāō^{n}), also spelt Uraon or Dhangad, are a Dravidian ethnolinguistic group indigenous to the Chhotanagpur Plateau and adjoining areas - mainly the Indian states of Jharkhand, Odisha, Chhattisgarh, and West Bengal. They predominantly speak Kurukh as their native language, which belongs to the Dravidian language family. In Maharashtra, Oraon people are also known as Dhangad.

Traditionally, Oraons depended on the forest and farms for their ritual practices and livelihoods, but in recent times, they have become mainly settled agriculturalists. Many Oraon migrated to tea gardens of Assam, West Bengal and Bangladesh as well as to countries like Fiji, Guyana, Trinidad and Tobago and Mauritius during British rule, where they were known as Hill Coolies. They are listed as a Scheduled Tribe in seven Indian states for the purpose of the reservation system.

== Etymology ==
According to Edward Tuite Dalton, "Oraon" is an exonym assigned by neighbouring Munda people, meaning "to roam". They call themselves Kurukh. According to Sten Konow, Uraon will mean man as in the Dravidian Kurukh language, the word Urapai, Urapo and Urang means Man. The word Kurukh may be derived from the word Kur or Kurcana means "shout" and "stammer". So Kurukh will mean 'a speaker'.

=== Name ===
The Kurukh are also locally known as Kuṛux, Kuruḵẖ, Kurukh, Kunrukh, Kurka, Kadukali, Urang, Oraon, Uraon, Urāo, and Orāỗ. Other designations include Dhakad, Dhangad, Dhanka, and Kuda, in Madhya Pradesh, and Dhangar, and Kisan, although Dravidologist Kamil Zvelebil reported that Dhangar (alternatively, Jhanger, Jangad, Orau, Oraon, and Uraon), reported from South Nepal, differed from Kurux (Oraon) proper.

== History ==
According to the Indian Anthropological Society, Konkan is said to be the original home of the Kurukh tribes from where they migrated to the Chota Nagpur Plateau. The group is said to have settled in the Chota Nagpur Plateau by 100 CE.

There are three opinions of scholars about the origin of Kurukh people. According to Sarat Chandra Roy, Kurukh people might have migrated from Coorg in South India. In 1987, Elefenbein offered a hypothesis of a Balochi provenance, in which he proposed the Brahui tribe migrated from Baluchistan to Sindh where Brahui is still spoken, and the Rohtasgarh and Rajmahal hills. Those who migrated to Rohtasgarh were Kurukh and those venturing to Rajmahal hills were Malto. According to another opinion, Kurukh people were living in Indus Valley Civilisation, then they migrated to South and Central India after the decline of the Indus Valley Civilisation due to droughts and floods in 2500 BCE.

According to the writings of Colonel Edward Tuite Dalton, Oraon claimed that they were settled in Gujarat, until they were expelled from there. Then they settled in Kalinjar, where they fought with Lowrik Sowrik of Palipiri and were defeated. Then they came to Rohtasgarh and were driven out by Muslims during the reign of Akbar. Then they settled in Chotanagpur. According to Dalton, Oraon were settled in Chotanagpur before the reign of Akbar and possibly some Oraon were in Rohtas hills when Rohtasgarh fort was constructed by Muslims. According to him the Oraon language is similar to Tamil, but some words spoken by Oraon are of Sanskrit origin due to their living with Sanskrit and Prakrit speaking people in the past. The physical features of Oraon are the darkest but those who live in mixed settlements have varieties of features.

=== Colonial rule ===
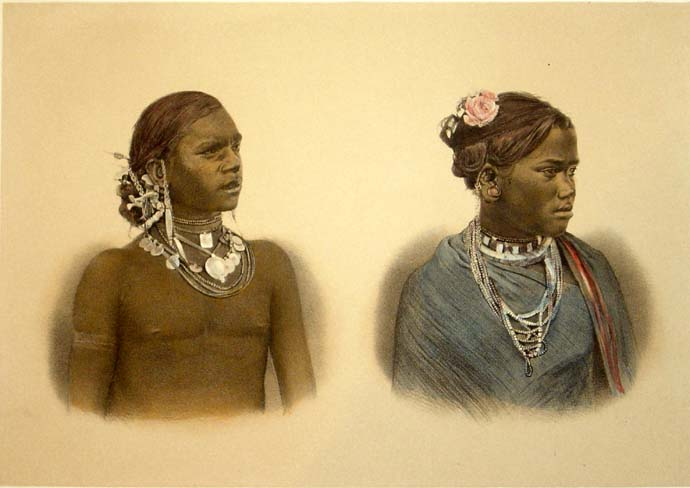
Dalton's painting of Oraons in 1872

During the British rule, Kurukh people rebelled against the British East India Company authority and local Zamindars against tax imposition. The Budhu Bhagat led the Lakra rebellion which is also known as the Kol uprising in 1832.

Jatra Bhagat led civil disobedience movement Tana Bhagat Movement from 1914 to 1920. After independence of India, they were listed as a Scheduled Tribe for the purpose of India's reservation system.

== Society ==
The Kurukh tribe is patrilocal and patrilineal. Kurukhs are divided into many exogamous clans. Clans names among the Kurukh are taken from plants, animals and objects. These clan names are also used in Oraon people's last names. Some important clans are:

- Addo (ox)
- Aind (a fish)
- Alla (dog)
- Bakula (Heron)
- Bando (wild cat)
- Bara (Banyan)
- Barwa (wild dog)
- Beck (Salt)
- Chidra (Squirrel)
- Edgo (Mouse)
- Ekka or kachhap (Turtle)
- Gari (monkey)
- Gede (Duck)
- Gidhi (vulture)
- Halman (langur)
- Keond (a fruit)
- Khoya (wild dog)
- Kinduar (a fish)
- Kindo (a fish)
- Kosuar (a fish)
- Kiro (a fruit)
- Kissi (pig)
- Kerketta (Hedge-sparrow)
- Kokro (cock)
- Kujur (A medicinal plant)
- Lakra (Tiger)
- Minz (a fish)
- Khetta or Nag (Cobra)
- Panna (Iron)
- Tido (a fish)
- Tirkuar (tithio bird)
- Tirkey (an eagle)
- Toppo (Woodpecker)
- Tigga (Monkey)
- Xalxo (pigeon)
- Xaxa (Crow)
- Xess or Dhan (Paddy)
- Halko or khalkho (fish)

== Culture ==
=== Language ===
Kurukh are traditional speakers of Kurukh, which belongs to the northern branch of the Dravidian family. Just under half still speak this language as their mother tongue. Many have adopted the local lingua francas, Sadri and Odia, as their first languages. This shift to regional languages, especially Sadri, has been most pronounced in West Bengal, Bangladesh, Assam and Tripura, where the Kurukh are mainly tea garden workers and Sadri is the main link language.

Approximately 200,000 Kurukhs in the Ranchi suburbs speak a creolised Mundari dialect called Keraʔ Mundari (Glottolog kera1257). Remarkably, despite being known as a creole, Keraʔ Mundari has very little in common with Kurukh or Dravidian languages at all but retains some archaic Munda phonological characteristics that have been lost in Hasadaʔ Mundari (main Mundari dialect).

=== Festivals ===
The Kurukh celebrate all traditional festivals of the Chota Nagpur plateau: Sarhul, Karma, Dhanbuni, Harihari, Nawakhani, Khariyani etc.

=== Music and dance ===
Since time immemorial The Oraon people have a rich range of folk songs, dances and tales, as well as traditional musical instruments. Both men and women participate in dances, which are performed at social events and festivals. The Mandar, Nagara and Kartal are the main musical instruments. In Kurukh, song is known as "Dandi". Some Kurukh folk dances are war dances (between two Parhas), Karma dance (Karam dandi), Khaddi or Sarhul dance, Phagu, Jadur, jagra, Matha, Benja Nalna (wedding dance) and Chali (courtyard dance).

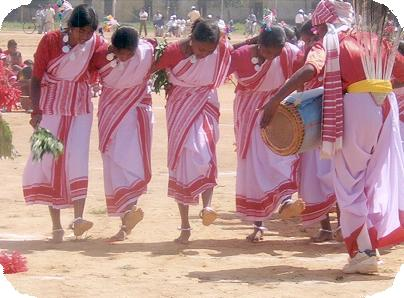
Sarhul dance known as Khaddi

A Kurukh Karam Puja song

A Kurukh rice-planting song

=== Marriage tradition ===
Marriage among Kurukhs is usually arranged by the parents. The parents negotiate a bride price, after which the wedding can take place. On the wedding day, the groom arrives with his friends to the bride's house, and they hold a dance. A pandal is constructed in front of the bride's father's house, and the bride and groom stand on a stone, under which is grain above a plough yoke. A cloth is then thrown over the couple, who are doubly screened by the groom's friends. Then the sindoordaan is done: the groom applies sindoor to the bride's forehead, which is sometimes returned. Afterwards, water is poured over the couple and they return to a separate area of the house to change. When they are emerged, they are considered married. During this entire time, the rest of the party continue to dance.

=== Dress ===
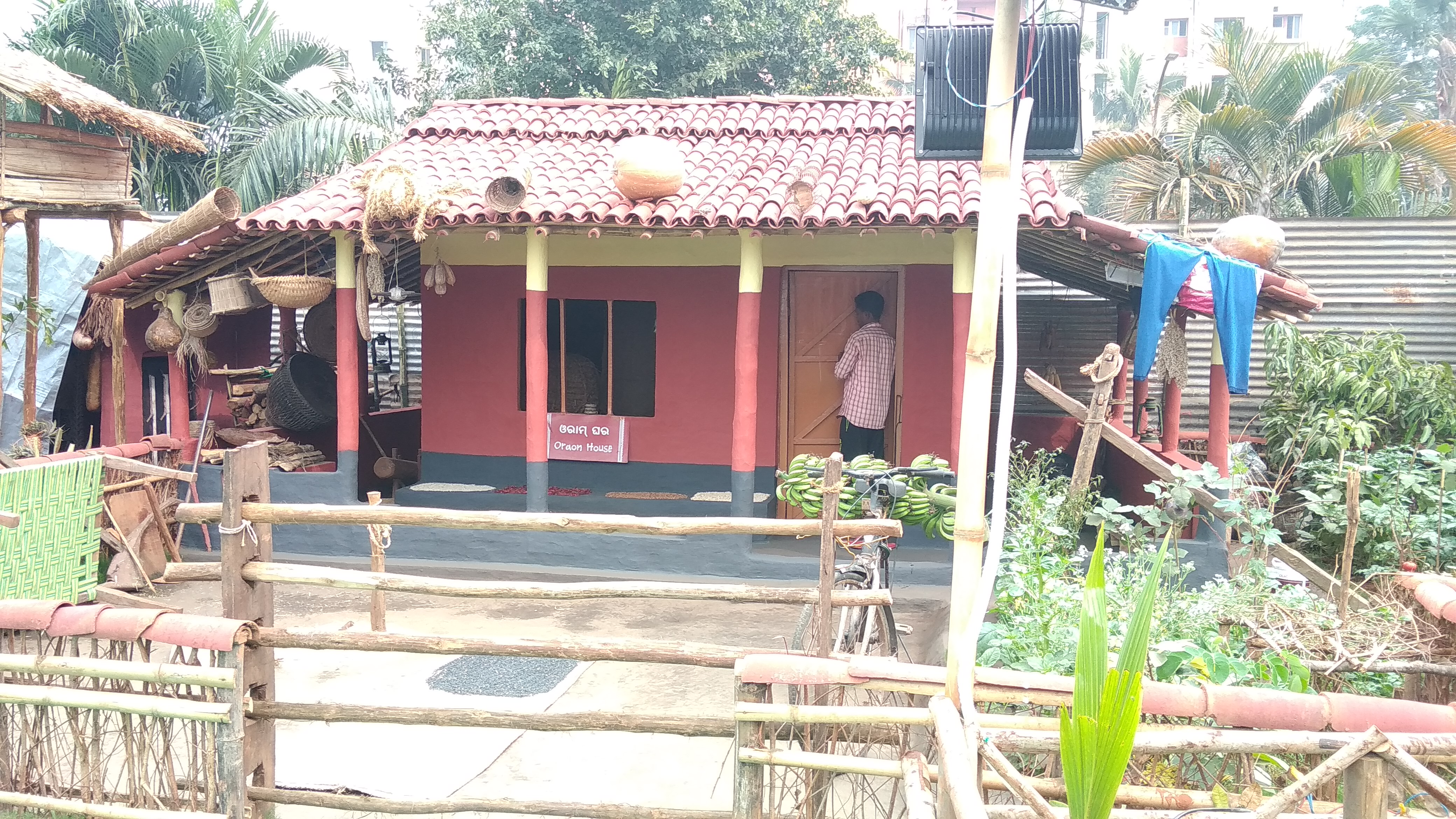
Oraon House at 'State Tribal Fair-2020' Bhubaneswar, India

At the turn of the 20th century, Kurukh men wore a loincloth tied around the hips, while women less influenced by other communities would wear a cloth reaching to just above the knee, covering the chest. Today, women traditionally a wear thick cotton sari with detailed stitched borders of purple or red thread. Traditional tattoos include elaborate symmetrical patterns around their forearms, ankles, and chest. Men wear a thick cloth with similar detailed borders as a dhoti or lungi.

=== Livelihood ===
Originally, the Oraons relied on the forest and its goods for an economic livelihood. Unlike many other communities of Jharkhand which practice jhum, the Kurukh community uses plough agriculture. At the turn of the 20th century however, due to the policies of the British colonial government, most of the tribe worked as agricultural labourers for the Zamindars on their own lands. However, recently many have become settled agriculturists, while others became migrant workers.

A Kurukh hunting song

=== Administration ===
In a Kurukh village, the village level political organisation is called Parha which consists of post such as Pahan (village priest), Panibharwa (water-bearer of Pahan), Pujar (assistant of Pahan), Bhandari and Chowkidar (watchman). Each has a particular role in religious ceremonies, festivals and solving disputes in the village. The traditional informal educational institution youth dormitory is called Dhumkuria. The public and common meeting place is Akhra where people meet for the purpose of discussion and solving disputes.

Twelve to thirty villages form a Parha council. Each village has a village council, member of village council act as the members of Parha council in the headship of Parha chief. One of the villages in Parha is called Raja (King) village, another dewan (prime minister) village, another panrey (clerk of the village), a fourth kotwar (orderly) village and remaining village are called praja (subject) village. Raja village has highest social status because headman of this village presides at the meeting of a Parha Panchayat. The Kurukh are patrilocal and patrilineal. Clan name descends from father to son. The major lineage is known as Bhuinhari Khunt. Bhuinhari means owner of the land. Khunt has two sub groups: the Pahan Khunt and Mahato Khunt. Pahan and Mahato are two main office of Bhuinhari lineage.

== Religion ==
Religion of Kurukh people, 2011 census
1. Hinduism (36.4%)
2. Christianity (30.2%)
3. Sarnaism (29.2%)
4. Adi Dharam (1.95%)
5. Addi Bassi (0.98%)
6. Adi (0.48%)
7. Not stated (0.25%)
8. Other (0.53%)
*Statistics of the religion of the Kurukh population in Jharkhand, West Bengal, Odisha, Chhattisgarh, Bihar, and Tripura, where they are classified as Scheduled Tribes.

According to the 2011 census of India, the Scheduled Tribes Kurukh population in India numbers 3,623,512. Among them, 36.37% are followers of Hinduism, 30.24% follow Christianity, 29.2% practice Sarna, 1.95% follow Adi Dharam, 0.98% adhere to Addi Bassi, and 0.48% follow Adi, while 0.25% did not state any religious affiliation. Additionally, there are smaller numbers of Muslims (7,459), Buddhists (1,904), Tana Bhagats (978), Oraons (770), Sikhs (423), and others, with 5,381 individuals returning some unclassified religion.

The Oraon follow their traditional religion (Sarnaism), which is based on nature worship. Some of the groups started following Sarnaism in a Hindu style, as the sects of the Bishnu Bhagats, Bacchinda Bhagats, Karmu Bhagats and Tana Bhagats. The Oraons have established several Sarna sects. Oraons worship Sun as biri (a name given for Dharmesh). Kurukhar also believe in Animism.

Most of the population is Sarna, which is a religion that is indigenous to Adivasis in the Chota Nagpur Plateau. Sarna perform religious rituals under the shade of a sacred grove. They worship the sun as Biri and the moon as Chando, and call the earth Dharti Aayo (Earth as mother). Chando Biri are the words which are used in Sarna pujas. Dharmesh is their supreme almighty god.

Kamru Bhagats (Oraon or Munda devotees) originated when Oraons acquired special powers after making a pilgrimage to Kamakhya in Assam to pay respect to Durga.

The Tana Bhagat was formed by Oraon saints Jatra Bhagat and Turia Bhagat. Tana Bhagats opposed the taxes imposed on them by the British and staged a Satyagraha movement even before Mahatma Gandhi. All Tana Bhagats were followers of Gandhi during the Independence movement. Tana Bhagats still wear a khadi kurta, dhoti and Gandhi topi (cap) with tricoloured flag in their topi. All Tana Bhagats perform puja to the Mahadeo and the tricolour with a chakra symbol on it, which is fixed at their courtyard.

Among Christian Oraons, there are Roman Catholics and Protestants, the latter of which having several denominations.

== In popular culture ==
In 1957, film-maker Ritwik Ghatak shot a preparatory test film named Oraon on the life of the Adivasis of the Ranchi region in Jharkhand and on the Oraons of Rani Khatanga Village in Jharkhand.

== Notable people ==
- Joachim Baxla, Member of Parliament
- Ignace Beck, Member of Parliament, Loksabha
- Budhu Bhagat, freedom fighter
- Indra Nath Bhagat, Member of Parliament
- Jatra Bhagat, freedom fighter and social reformist
- Sudarshan Bhagat, Member of Parliament, central minister Government of india
- Sukhdeo Bhagat, Member of Legislative Assembly Government of Jharkhand, Member of Parliament And President Jharkhand Pradesh Congress Committee
- Albert Ekka, recipient of India's highest wartime gallantry award Param Vir Chakra
- Anosh Ekka, Minister Government of Jharkhand
- Deep Grace Ekka, Indian hockey player
- Madhu Mansuri Hasmukh, singer and activist
- Rajesh Kachhap, Member of Legislative Assembly Government of Jharkhand
- Jacinta Kerketta, journalist and poet
- Michael Kindo, hockey player
- Animesh Kujur, Animesh Kujur (born 2 June 2003) is an Indian sprinter. He is the current national record holder for 100 metres, 200 metres and 4 × 100 metres relay.
- Renee Kujur, model
- Santiuse Kujur, MP of Assam
- Birendra Lakra, Indian hockey player
- Provat Lakra, Football player of West Bengal
- Sawna Lakra, Member of Legislative Assembly Government of Bihar and Government of Jharkhand
- Sunita Lakra, Indian hockey player
- Chamra Linda, Minister Government of Jharkhand
- Nirmal Minz, scholar
- Lilima Minz, Indian hockey player
- Mukut Minz, Mukut Minz is an Indian doctor. In 2017, he was awarded the Padma Shri by the Indian Government for his contribution in medicine.
- Sonajharia Minz, vice-chancellor to the Sido Kanhu Murmu University
- Astam Oraon, Indian football player, under 19 World Cup Indian captain
- Jual Oram, Ministry of Tribal Affairs,Govt Of India
- Dinesh Oraon, Indian politician currently serving as speaker of Jharkhand legislative assembly and a leader of Bharatiya Janata Party from Jharkhand
- Kartik Oraon, Member of Parliament, Lok Sabha cabinet minister Government of India, founder, president Akhil Bharatiya Adivasi Vikash Parishad & Kendriya Sarna Samiti Bharat.
- Rameshwar Oraon, former IPS officer and politician, cabinet minister Government of India, cabinet minister Government of Jharkhand, President Jharkhand Pradesh Congress commity, president National commission of scheduled tribe Government of India
- Manoj Kumar Oraon MLA, cabinet minister Govt of West Bengal
- Sameer Oraon. Former Member of Rajya Sabha and National President Bharatiya Janata Party ST Morcha
- Simon Oraon, environmentalist & Padma Shri awardee
- Manisa Panna, football player
- Manoj Tigga, Member of Parliament Alipurduar
- Simon Tigga, politician
- Bandhu Tirkey, Minister Government of Jharkhand
- Bhushan Tirkey, Member of Legislative Assembly Government of Jharkhand
- Dasrath Tirkey, Member of Parliament
- Dilip Tirkey, President of the Hockey India
- Ignace Tirkey, hockey player
- Manohar Tirkey, politician
- Pius Tirkey, Member of Parliament
- Rupa Rani Tirkey, lawn ball player
- Shilpi Neha Tirkey, Minister Government of Jharkhand
- Biju Toppo, documentary filmmaker
- Binita Toppo, hockey player
- Namita Toppo, Indian hockey playe
- Telesphore Toppo, Cardinal
- Abhay Xaxa (1983–2020), Human rights activist, poet, and social anthropologist
- Pyari Xaxa, football player

== See also ==
- Kharia people
- Kisan people
