= Dayamani Barla =

Indian politician

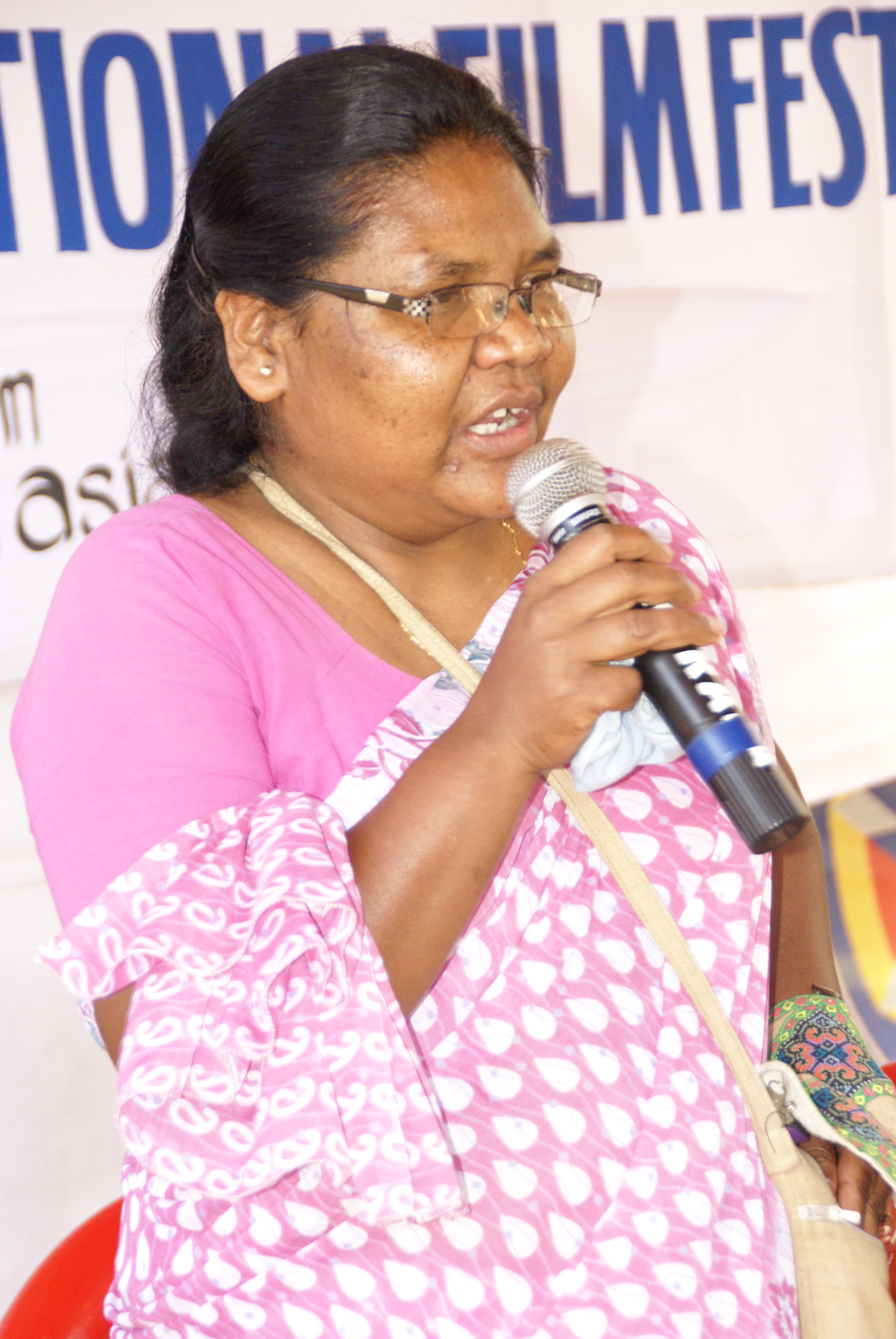
- Dayamani Barla in ViBGYOR Film Festival, 2012
- Occupations: Journalist; writer; social activist
- Organization: Adivasi-Moolvasi Astitva Raksha Manch
- Awards: Counter Media Award for Rural Journalism (2000); National Foundation for India Fellowship (2004)

Dayamani Barla is an Indian tribal journalist and activist from the Indian state of Jharkhand. She became notable for her activism in opposing Arcelor Mittal's steel plant in Eastern Jharkhand that tribal activists say would displace forty villages.

Barla has won a number of prestigious awards for journalism. She unsuccessfully ran from the Khunti Lok Sabha Constituency, Jharkhand in the 2014 Lok Sabha elections as an Aam Aadmi Party candidate.

== Early life ==
Dayamani was born in a tribal family (also known as Adivasi in India) in the Jharkhand state of eastern India. Her family belonged to the Munda tribe. Dayamani's father, like other tribals in the region, was cheated out of his property because he could not read and lacked paperwork to show his rights to the land. Her father became a servant in one city, and her mother a maid in another. Barla remained in school in Jharkhand but worked as a day laborer on farms from the 5th to 7th grades. To continue her education through secondary school, she moved to Ranchi and worked as a maid to pay her way through university. She sometimes slept at railway stations in order to continue her education in journalism.

== Career ==
Barla works in a popular Hindi newspaper Prabhat Khabar to bring attention to myriad problems facing the Munda people and other tribal communities in the Jharkhand region. She is the National President of Indian Social Action Forum INSAF. Her early journalistic work was supported by a small fellowship through the Association for India's Development (AID). Barla owns and runs a tea shop that effectively supports her journalistic work and career. She chose the business consciously because tea shops are gathering places where social issues are discussed.

== Activism ==
The Jharkhand region is rich in natural resources and many government and private companies have appropriated land to build a number of natural resource extracting factories. Although the tribal people are supposed to receive compensation, a number of activists allege that they do not receive adequate compensation. Arcelor Mittal wants to invest US$8.79 billion to set up one of the world's biggest steel plants in the area. The Greenfield steel project requires 12,000 acres (49 km^{2}) of land and a new power plant. According to Barla, that would displace forty tribal villages. Barla and her organisation, Adivaasi, Moolvaasi, Astitva Raksha Manch (Forum for the Protection of Tribal and Indigenous People's Identity) argue that, apart from causing massive displacement, the project will destroy the forests in the area. It will also affect the water sources and ecosystems, thereby threatening the environment and the very source of sustenance for indigenous peoples. Arcelor Mittal on its part says that it does not want to grab local people's land and that it is willing to negotiate with all stake holders. But Barla counters that the subsistence tribal communities will not survive the alienation from their native land and they cannot be compensated for such a loss.

Barla's activist work was the subject of the 2013 documentary film Ballad of Resistance by filmmaker Leena Manimekalai.

== Awards ==
- Barla won the Counter Media Award for Rural Journalism in 2000 and the National Foundation for India Fellowship in 2004. Counter Media Award is funded by royalties from journalist P. Sainath's book Everyone Loves a Good Drought, and is meant for rural journalists whose (often outstanding) work gets ignored or even appropriated by the larger press at the state or national level in India.
- In 2013, she was the recipient of the Ellen L. Lutz Indigenous Rights Award instituted by Cultural Survival, an international NGO.
- In 2023, she was named the Greeley Peace Scholar by the University of Massachusetts Lowell.

== See also ==
- Jacinta Kerketta
- Abhay Xaxa
