= Jatra Bhagat =

Indian tribal freedom fighter

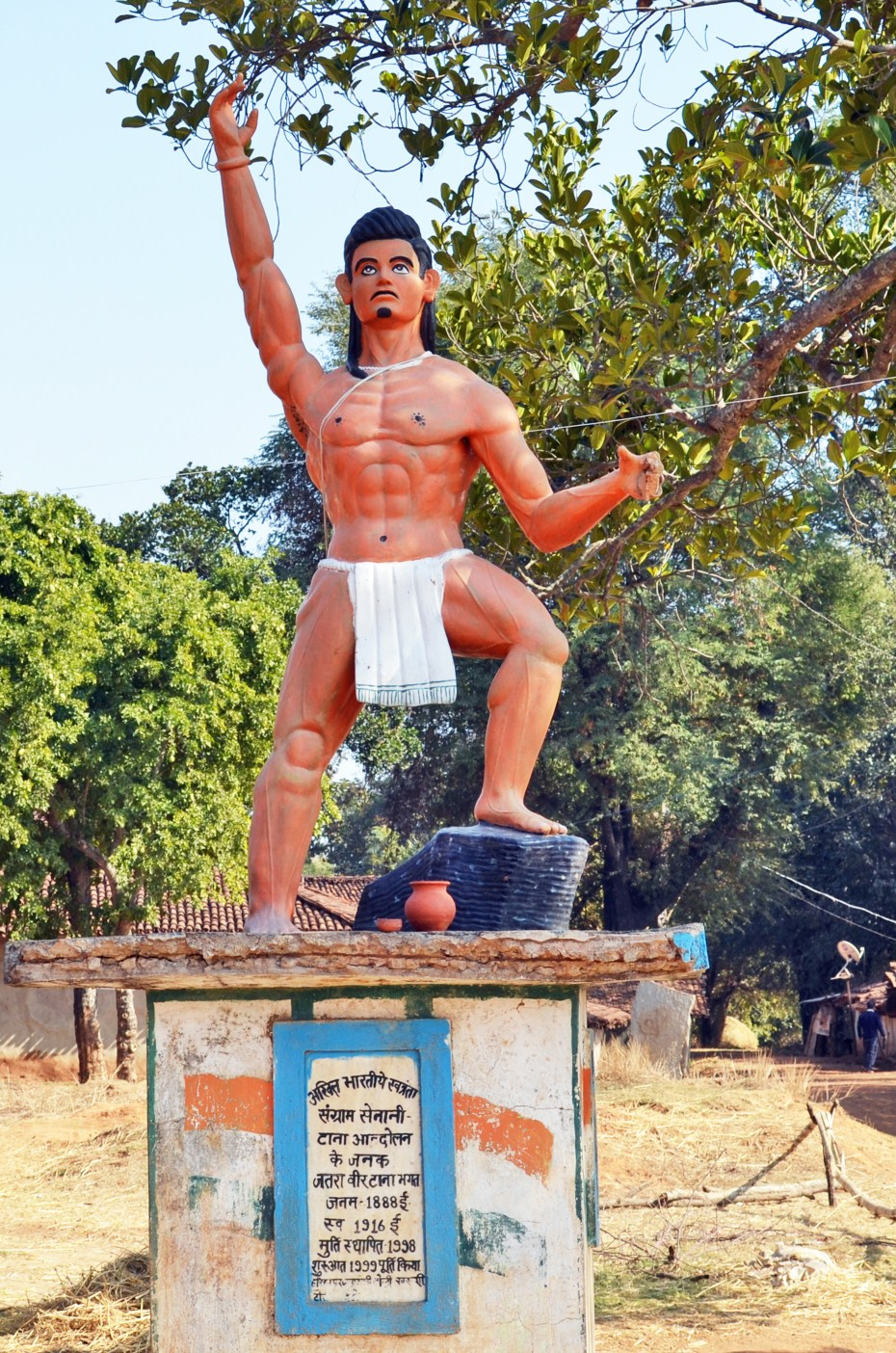
- Statue of Veer Jatra Tana Bhagat in Ranchi District, Jharkhand
- Born: Tana Bhaghat; September 1888; Village-Chingri Nawatoli, Ranchi District, Bengal Presidency, British India, (now Gumla District, Jharkhand), India
- Died: 1916; Village-Chingri Nawatoli, Ranchi District, Bihar and Orissa Province, British India, (now Gumla District, Jharkhand), India
- Other names: Tana Bhagat
- Known for: Tana Bhagat Movement; Bhagatism

Jatra Bhagat (1888–1916) was an Indian tribal freedom fighter and social reformist. He was the founder of Tana Bhagat Movement among the Oraon tribe.

Tana Bhagat alias Jatra Oraon was born in September 1888 at Chingri Nawatoli village in Gumla district of Jharkhand. His father's name was Kodal Oraon and mother's name was Libri.

== See also ==
- Tana Bhagat Movement
- Tana Bhagats
- Kurukh people
