= Jacinta Kerketta =

Indian journalist and poet (born 1983)

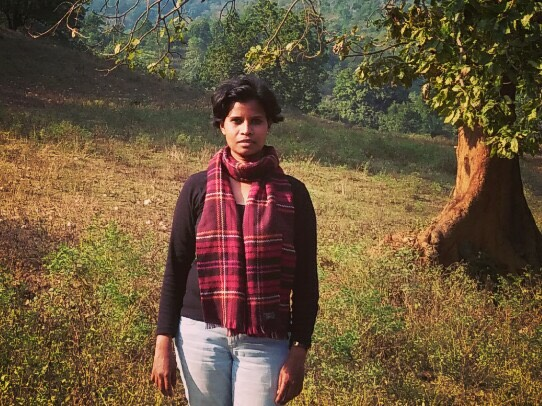
- Jacinta Kerketta
- Born: Jacinta Kerketta; 3 August 1983 (age 42); Khudaposh, West Singhbhum District, Jharkhand
- Occupations: journalist, writer
- Notable work: Angor; Jodon Ki Jameen

Jacinta Kerketta (born 3 August 1983) is an Indian Hindi-language journalist, poet and activist. Her poetry and journalism discusses the Adivasi identity of youth, protests against the systemic oppression of Adivasis in India, gender-based violence, especially against women, displacement and questions the state apathy of governance. Forbes India named her one of India's top 20 Self-Made Women list. Her first Hindi-English bilingual poetry collection Angor was translated into German, Italian and French. Her second Hindi-English bilingual poetry collection Jadon ki Zameen was translated into English and German. Ishwar aur Bazaar is her third poetry collection.

== Life ==
=== Childhood ===
Kerketta was born on 3 August 1983, to Pushpa Anima Kerketta and Jay Prakash Kerketta in Khudaposh, a village in the West Singhbhum District of the Indian state of Jharkhand located on the surroundings of the Saranda forest near the Jharkhand-Odisha border. She and her family are from the Oraon tribe. Her father was a marathon athlete who worked as a security guard at a local school run by a church and then temporarily worked in the police force.

=== Education ===
Kerketta mostly studied in different schools in the Santhal Pargana division in Jharkhand and also in Betiya of West Champaran district of Bihar. She went to a missionary boarding school in Manoharpur at the age of 13. graduated with a degree in mass communication and video production from St. Xavier's College, Ranchi in 2006. In 2016 she completed her master's degree in mass communication at the Ranchi University.

=== Career ===
According to her own account, Kerketta decided to become a journalist after witnessing intense violence that went unnoticed by local reporters. From 2010 to 2013 she was employed as a reporter by the Ranchi edition of the Hindi daily Dainik Jagran. In 2014 she received an award from UNDP and conducted a study titled "Adivasi And Mining In Five Districts Of Jharkhand". Since 2019 she has been a consulting for the Hindi edition of the Indian online news portal The Wire and for the Ranchi edition of the daily newspaper Prabhat Khabar. In addition to her journalistic work, Kerketta is also a social worker. Since 2015 she has been working in girls' education in Adivasi villages in the Simdega and Khunti districts in Jharkhand, with support from the Kutchina Foundation, Kolkata, among others.

== Views ==
Kerketta's work focuses on her home state Jharkhand which was separated in 2000 from Bihar with over 26 percent Adivasi population. The industrialisation that followed the state's formation and its endangering impact on the livelihood of the Adivasi are illustrated in her writing. She has also criticized the violent state response to conflicts.

== Awards and recognition ==
In 2014 she was awarded by the Asia Indigenous People's Pact (AIPP) in Bangkok for her journalistic work Indigenous Voice of Asia. That year she also received an award for her poems from the civil society organization Jharkhand Indigenous Peoples Forum and the Prerana Samman award from the Chota Nagpur Cultural Association. The Ravishankar Upadhyay Memorial Institute in Varanasi awarded her the Ravishankar Upadhyay Memorial Youth Poetry Award. In 2017 the daily Prabhat Khabar awarded her the Aparajita Award. In 2019 she received the Foundation of the Confederation of Indian Industry (CII) Women Exemplar Recognition Award. She was named one of India's top 20 Self-Made Women in 2022 by Forbes India.

In November 2023, Kerketta declined to accept the Aaj Tak Sahitya Jagriti Udyman Pratibha Samman, a literary award given by the India Today Group, for her collection of Hindi-language poems Ishwar aur Bazaar. Explaining her decision, she posted on X, saying: “At a time when there’s loss of respect for the lives of tribals in the country, tribals of central India and Manipur have no dignity of life and the lives of people and children of other communities are under continuous attack, how can any honor thrill a poet or writer?” Additionally, she called out mainstream media's lack of coverage of incidents in Manipur.

In September 2024, Kerketta rejected the Room to Read Young Author Award, issued in recognition of her children's poetry collection Jirhul. Kerketta rejected on the award in protest of awarding entities US AID and Room to Read India Trust complicity in Israel's genocide on Gaza, and particularly Room to Read India Trust's ties to Boeing.

=== Books ===
- Angor
- Land of The Roots
- Ishwar Aur Bazar
- Jacinta Ki Diary
- Prem Me Ped Hona
- Jirhul
