= Tana Bhagat Movement =

1914-1920 tribal movement

- Part of Indian independence movement
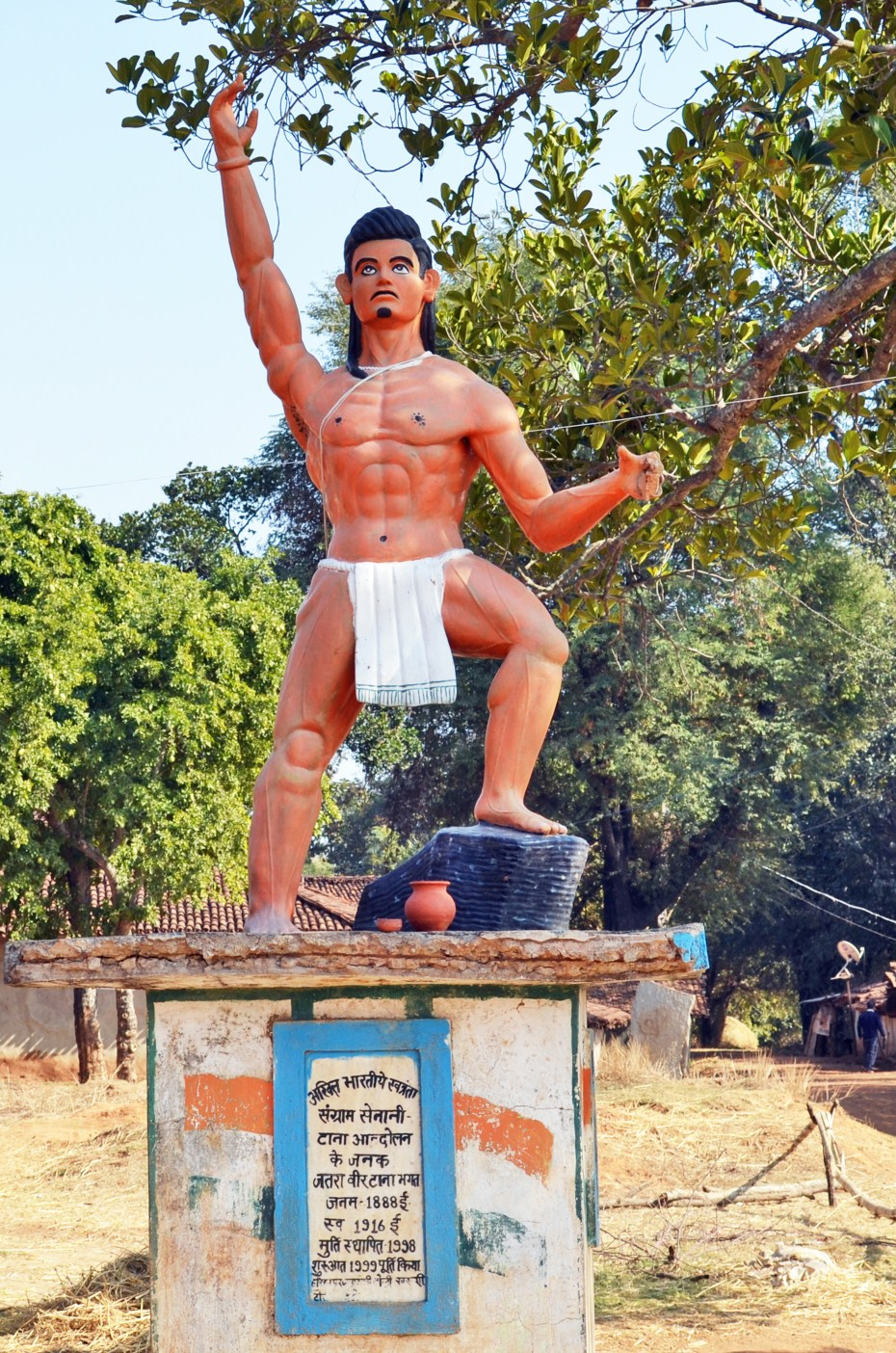
- Statue of Jatra Bhagat in Ranchi District, Jharkhand
- Location: Jharkhand
- Commanded by: Jatra Bhagat
- Date: 1914–1920
- Casualties: Unknown

Tana Bhagat Movement (1914–1920) was a movement in Chhotanagpur area of British India against the policies of the local British authorities and exploitative business practices of local zamindars, mostly by Oraon people.

The Tana Bhagats opposed the taxes imposed on them by the British colonial administration, staging a Satyagraha (civil disobedience movement) years before Mahatma Gandhi's similar movement against British rule. They opposed the zamindars, the banias, the Muslims, Christian missionaries, and the British. Tana Bhagats are followers of Mahatma Gandhi, and believe in Ahimsa (non-violence). In December 1920, the Tana Bhagat movement got integrated into the Indian nationalist movement and the Satyagraha movement, with the Tana Bhagats wholeheartedly supporting the non-cooperation movement and remaining non-violent.
