= Tana Bhagats =

Tribal community in Indian state of Jharkhand

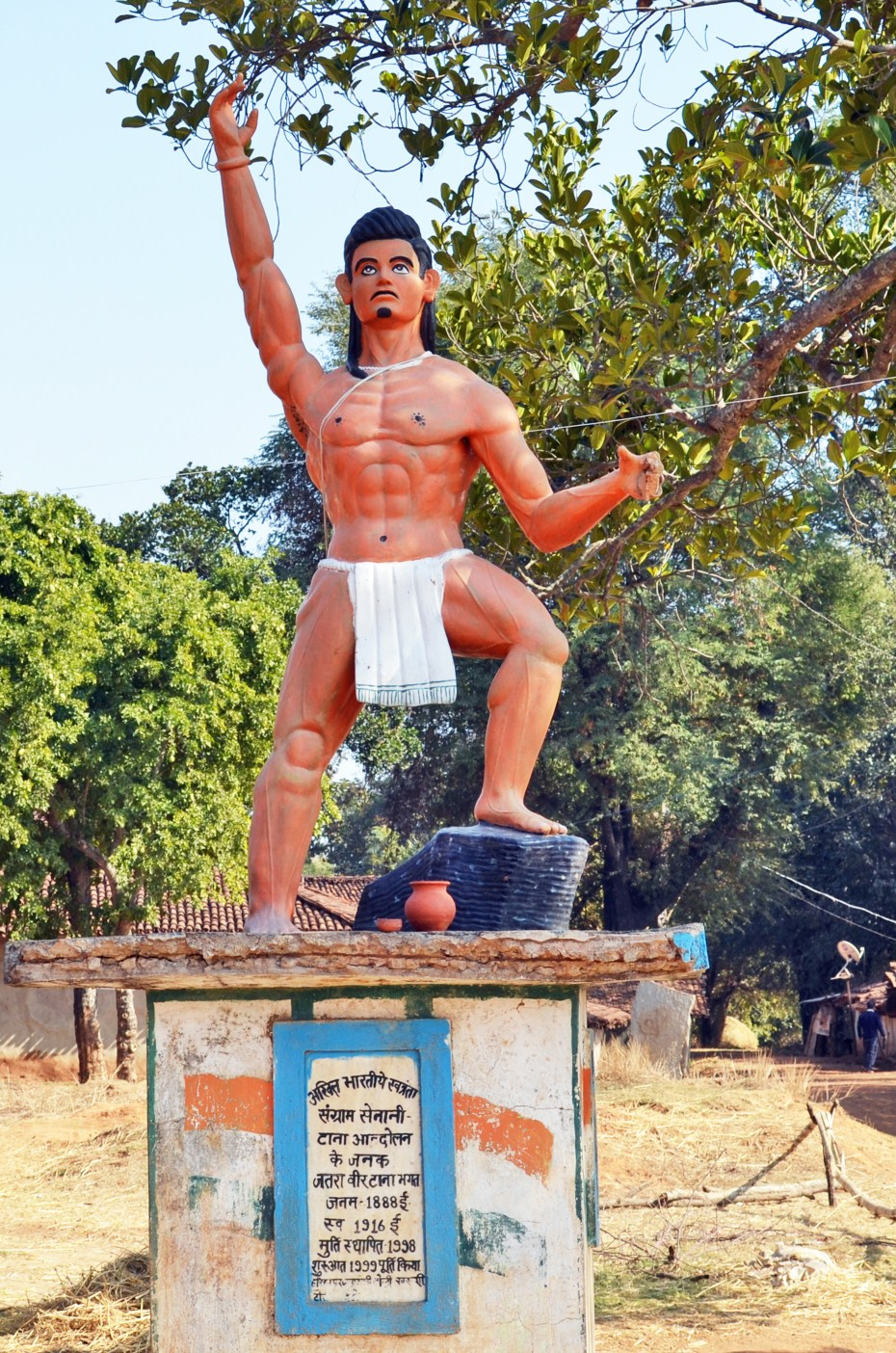
Statue of Veer Jatra Bhagat in Ranchi District, Jharkhand

Tana Bhagats is a tribal community in Indian state of Jharkhand. They are related to the historical Tana Bhagat Movement (1914).

== Formation ==
Tana Bhagats were formed by Oaron saints Jatra Bhagat and Turia Bhagat. Jatra Bhagat of Gumla, Ranchi proclaimed that he was divinely ordained to establish a new sect, the Tana sect, which was markedly different from the Oraon community. The Tanas sought to reorder the Oraon society by opposing the traditional leadership of the pahan (Oraon priest) and mahto (village representative in secular affairs), and by rejecting the practices of spirit worship and sacrifice. In its earlier phase it was called as Kurukh Dharma. Kurukh is original religion of the Oraons.

== Movement ==
The Tana Bhagats opposed the taxes imposed on them by the British and they staged nice poga Satyagraha (civil disobedience movement) even before Gandhi's satyagraha movement. They opposed the zamindars, the banias (moneylenders), the missionaries, the Muslims and the British state. Tana Bhagats are followers of Mahatma Gandhi, and believe in Ahimsa (Non-violence).

== Centenary ==
To observe the 100 years of the movement, a celebration was held with participation of Tana Bhagats from Ranchi, Lohardaga, Latehar and Chatra, besides Gumla districts.
