= Miniya Chatterji =

- Born: 6 March 1979 (age 47)
- Spouse: Chirag Lilaramani

Miniya Chatterji (born 6 March 1979) is a businesswoman and philanthropist. She is the CEO of Sustain Labs Paris, an enterprise based in India, UAE, and New Zealand that builds large sustainability focused ventures.

In the UAE, Sustain Labs Paris works with the country's largest companies and organisations including the Dubai World Trade Centre, Ministry of Education, ADNOC. In India, Sustain Labs Paris works across 200 companies.

Chatterji is known for building 28 hospitals during COVID-19 that provided free of cost and affordable healthcare. These hospitals were built across 5 states in India. She was acclaimed for innovations such as building COVID ambulances and mobile COVID testing facilities within an auto rickshaw, and successfully taking it to market. She founded a climate focused higher educational institution focusing on engineering solutions for climate change. She is building 10 climate focused university level institutions globally.

She was previously working as the Chief Sustainability Officer (CSO) at the USD 4 billion Jindal Steel and Power Ltd. (JSPL) and was one of the youngest top business women in India at the time.

She has been a speaker or moderator at Davos and at other World Economic Forum regional summits, the United Nations, European Union, PE International, Microsoft Innovation Cup and Digital-Life-Design (DLD).

== Early life and career ==
Chatterji was born in Jamshedpur, and completed her bachelor's degree and master's at Jawaharlal Nehru University (JNU), New Delhi in 2001. She completed her PhD & DEA Honors from Sciences Po, Paris in 2003, with research fellowships at Harvard University in 2004 and Columbia University in 2006–2007.

From 2002 to 2006 she worked in the office of the French President Jacques Chirac in Paris, as policy analyst to Jerome Monod who at that time was the President's Chief Advisor.

In 2007, she was a Private Wealth Management Summer Associate for Goldman Sachs London, post which she worked as Hedge Fund Manager at HSBC Hedge Funds in Paris.

In 2009, she quit investment banking. This was in the same week that she completed her PhD in Political Sciences in 2009 from Institut d'Etudes Politiques de Paris. In 2010 she founded the Stargazers Foundation, which aimed towards working in the domains of education and health for women in economically backward regions of India. Chatterji runs the Stargazers Foundation until today through which she carries out her philanthropic work.

In 2011 she joined the World Economic Forum as Senior Manager for Middle East, North Africa, South Asia regions. While working with the World Economic Forum, Miniya was also a Global Leadership Fellow of the World Economic Forum. Through the latter, she has also completed an Executive Management Programme in Leadership from The Wharton School, Columbia University, as well as from INSEAD.

In 2014 Chatterji returned to India after 14 years, to be Chief Sustainability Officer at Jindal Steel & Power Ltd. She founded Sustain Labs Paris in 2018.

== Jindal Steel and Power Ltd ==
In June 2014, Chatterji returned to India after 14 years of living her entire adult life abroad, to join Jindal Steel & Power Group of Companies, as their chief sustainability officer. She was responsible for setting up the JSPL's Business Sustainability division and led a global team across countries including India, South Africa, Oman and Australia. She published various editions of JSPL's Business Sustainability report as per GRI (Global Reporting Initiative) G4 framework.

== Sustain Labs Paris ==
Chatterji parted ways with JSPL in September 2017, to establish her entrepreneurial brainchild "Sustain Labs Paris".

== Writer and columnist ==
Published by Penguin Random House, Indian Instincts (book), was launched in January 2018. The book is a set of 15 inter-linked essays on the quality of freedom and equality in India. The book's rights were bought over by Sampark Publications for its Bengali translation and by Penguin for Indian Instinct's French translation.

She is a columnist for The Indian Express, The Pioneer, and Harvard Business Review. She is represented by literary agent David Godwin in London.

== Stargazers Foundation ==
Chatterji founded the Stargazers Foundation, a Not-for-Profit organization in 2010. It currently works for rehabilitating the 11 million children living on the streets in India.

== Awards and recognition ==
She has been awarded by the Navoothan Foundation, for her personal social commitment. She has also been awarded the prestigious CSR India award 2016 for corporate social responsibility. She was awarded as India's most influential leader in the field of sustainability at the India Sustainability Leadership Summit and Awards in 2018. In 2019 she was named in Business World's 40 under 40 Most Influential Business Leaders in India list. Thereafter, in recognition of her works, Chatterji has also been on the cover of Business Asia and Gulf News Friday Magazine.

== Personal life ==
Chatterji is married to businessman Chirag Lilaramani. They have one son. Miniya is passionate about textiles contemporary art and hand-looms, which got her featured on the cover of Raw Mango's look book 2015, as well as Vogue.
