= Mukut Minz =

Indian doctor

- Born: Mukut Minz; Odisha
- Awards: Padma Shri (2017)

Mukut Minz is an Indian doctor. In 2017, he was awarded the Padma Shri by the Indian Government for his contribution in medicine.

== Early life and education ==
Minz is from Goibhanga in Odisha. In 1975, he did his graduation in medicine from VSS Medical College in Sambalpur. He did his master's degree in general surgery in 1980.

== Career ==
Minz started his career as a resident medical officer at Catholic Mission Hospital at Kolunga. He worked as a junior resident at JIPMER in Pondicherry. He was the head of the department of renal transplant surgery at Post Graduate Institute of Medical Education and Research (PGIMER), Chandigarh. He retired in 2016 and joined Fortis Hospital in Mohali as a director.

== Awards ==
- Padma Shri in 2017
