= Abhay Xaxa =

Indian activist and scholar (1983–2020)

Abhay Flavian Xaxa
- Born: c. 1983; Chitkawine, Jashpur, Madhya Pradesh (now in Chhattisgarh), India
- Died: 14 March 2020 (aged 36–37); Jalpaiguri, West Bengal, India
- Education: University of Sussex (M.A in sociology); Jawaharlal Nehru University (M.Phil & PhD in sociology)
- Occupations: Activist; poet; anthropologist; author
- Known for: Adivasi and Dalit rights activism
- Notable work: I Am Not Your Data

Abhay Flavian Xaxa (c. 1983 – 14 March 2020) was an Indian Adivasi rights activist, poet, and social anthropologist. He was known for his efforts to advocate for indigenous identity, land rights, and social justice. He was a research scholar at Jawaharlal Nehru University. After graduating in social anthropology from the University of Sussex, he focused on empowering adivasi youth through education and activism. His poem I Am Not Your Data become known for his Adivasi resistance against marginalisation. He died at the age of 37 due to a heart attack.

== Early life and education ==
Abhay Xaxa was born in Chitkawine village, located in the Jashpur district of Madhya Pradesh (now in northern Chhattisgarh). He belonged to the Kurukh tribe. Abhay completed a Commerce degree in Kunkuri, studied law at a college in Jabalpur. He earned a master's in Social Anthropology from the University of Sussex through a Ford Foundation fellowship in 2007, and later obtained an MPhil and a PhD in Sociology from Jawaharlal Nehru University, with his doctoral research focusing on Adivasi land rights in Jharkhand.

== Career ==
His early professional career included work in Hindi journalism, but he soon shifted focus to research and activism due to the marginalisation of Adivasi issues in mainstream media. He was a national convener of the National Campaign on Adivasi Rights (NCAR) and also served as a program coordinator with National Campaign for Dalit Human Rights (NCDGR) from 2012 to 2019 and coconvener of the Tribal Intellectual Collective.

In 2015, Abhay Xaxa led a protest against the Land Acquisition Bill, where a group of Adivasi men publicly discarding the copies of the bill through a bold public act. This non-violent protest aim to highlight land rights violations and corporate land grabs affecting Adivasi communities in Jharkhand.

He died on 14 March 2020 due to heart attack.

== Literary work ==
As a writer, he wrote a poem I Am Not Your Data. Apart from this he co-authored some books.

- Being Adivasi: Existence, Entitlements, Exclusion
- Rethinking India : The Politics of the Marginalized
