= Jamuna Tudu =

Indian environmental activist (born 1980)

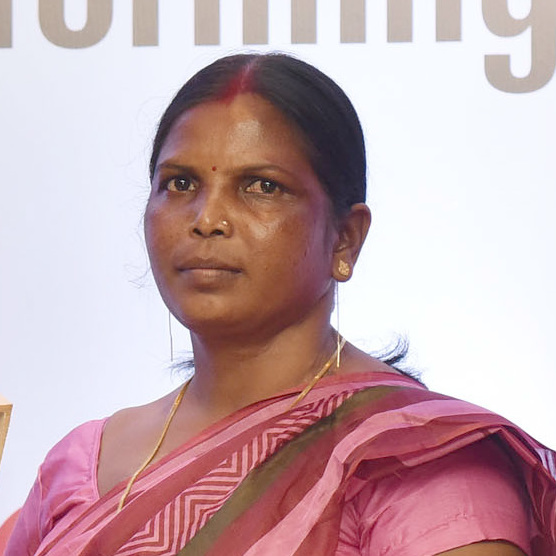
- Jamuna Tudu in 2017
- Born: 19 December 1980 (age 45); Mayurbhanj, Odisha, India
- Other name: Lady Tarzan
- Years active: 1998–present
- Known for: Environmental activist
- Spouse: Mansingh Tudu (m. 1998)
- Parents: Bagrai Murmu (father); Bobyshree Murmu (mother)
- Awards: Padma Shri

Jamuna Tudu (born 19 December 1980) is an Indian environmental activist. She and five other women prevented illegal felling of trees near her village and this later expanded into an organisation. She is called ‘Lady Tarzan’ for taking on the Timber mafias and Naxals in Jharkhand.

She is also the founder of “Van Suraksha Samiti’ which prevent illegal felling of trees near her village in Jharkhand.

== Early life ==
Jamuna Tudu was born on 19 December 1980 in Rairangpur of, Mayurbhanj, Odisha, India. when she was 18 years old she decides to fight for forest and take up bows and arrows to combat and track timber mafiosi and report them to cops.

Jamuna Tudu loves nature very much, her journey started in 1998. Then Jamuna reached her mother-in-law's Muturkham village in Chakulia block after her marriage. At that time the forest mafia were indiscriminately cutting down trees in the forest near Muturkham village. Seeing this condition of the forest visible from the door of the house, Jamuna decided to save the trees and hit the jungle mafia, then the process continued. Jamuna was prevented by the family from doing all this, but she set out on a campaign to unite the women of the village and save the forest. Many times they were subjected to deadly attacks, but Jamuna never gave up and the decision to save the forest was upheld.

Tudu formed "Van Suraksha Samiti' along with five other women to prevent illegal felling of trees near her village and this later expanded.

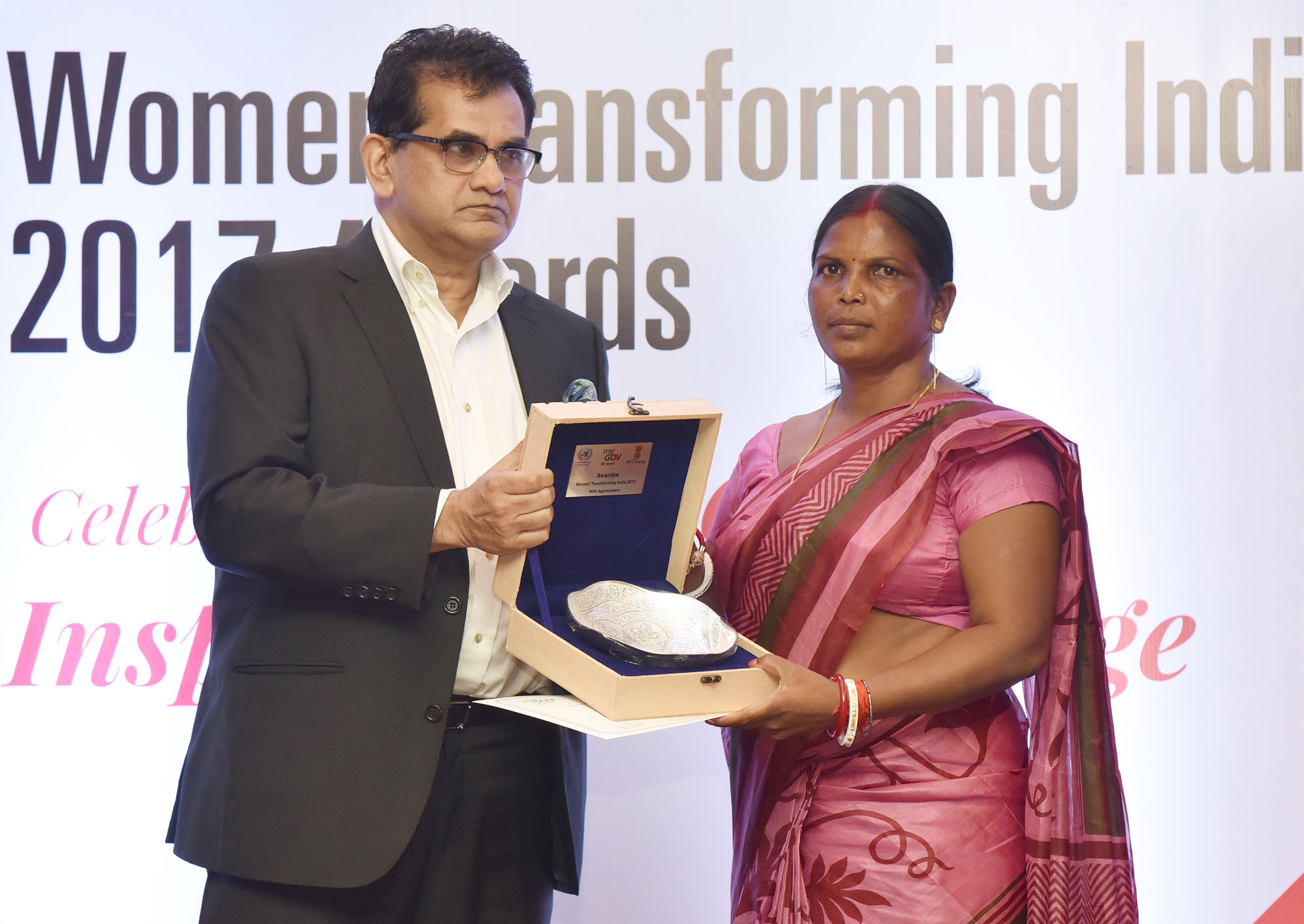
The CEO, NITI Aayog, Shri Amitabh Kant presenting the ‘Women Transforming India Award 2017’ to Ms. Jamuna Tudu Matrukham (Jharkhand) – Maturkham’s Lady Tarzan, organised by the NITI Aayog, in New Delhi on August 29, 2017

== Awards ==
- Padma Shri 2019
- Women Transforming India 2017
- Godfrey Phillips National Bravery Awards 2014
- Women Transforming India – 2017

She was a winner in the 2017 Women Transforming India awards.

She was awarded India's fourth highest civilian award the Padma Shri in 2019. She was awarded the Godfrey Phillips Bravery Award 2014. She is called Lady Tarzan for taking on the Timber mafia in Jharkhand.

In 2020 it announced that she and Chami Murmu were to join forces to protect Jharkhand's forests. They were both called the Lady Tarzans in the press. Chami Murmu has 3,000 members in her organisation and together they hope to find some synergy.

== Mann Ki Baat ==
Prime Minister Narendra Modi appreciated her work in his Mann ki Baat addresses the people that Yamuna Tudu did the adventure of taking iron from the timber mafia and Naxalites. Not only did she save 50 hectares of forest from ravaging, but united 10,000 women and motivated them to protect trees and wildlife. It is great that today the villagers plant 18 trees on the birth of a child and 10 trees on the marriage of girls.
