= Ram Krishna Singh =

Indian poet (born 1950)

Ram Krishna Singh (born 31 December 1950) is a reviewer, critic, and contemporary poet who writes in Indian English.

== Early life ==
Dr.Singh was born on 31 December 1950 in Varanasi, India. After earning a B.A in 1970, he gained his M.A. in English Literature from Banaras Hindu University in 1972, and his Ph.D. from Kashi Vidyapith, Varanasi, in 1981. He also obtained a Diploma in Russian in 1972.

== Career ==
He started his career in journalism, as a Compilation Officer in the District Gazetteers Department, Lucknow, 1973, and a Journalist with the Press Trust of India, New Delhi, 1973–74. Changing to teaching he became a lecturer at the Royal Bhutan Polytechnic, Deothang, Bhutan, 1974–76. Joining the Indian School of Mines in Dhanbad as Lecturer from 1976 to 1983, he then rose to assistant professor in 1983. He has been Professor of English in the Department of Humanities and Social Sciences IIT (ISM) Dhanbad, since 1993 and retired as Professor (HAG) on 31 December 2015. The poet is also a recognized name in ESP (English for Specific Purposes) from India. He has evaluated about 40 Ph.D. theses from various universities. He has also edited the ISM Newsletter for about five years.

== Works ==
Dr. Singh is the author of more than 175 research articles, 180 book reviews, and 62 books. His works have been anthologized in approximately 235 publications, while his editorial activities include guest-editing of Language Forum, 1986, 1995, and Creative Forum, 1991, 1997, 1998. He was also co-editor of the latter publication from 1987 to 1990, General Editor of Creative Forum New Poets Series, and service on the editorial boards of Canopy, Indian Book Chronicle, Indian Journal of Applied Linguistics, Reflections, Titiksha, International Journal of Translation, Poetcrit, Impressions of Eternity (i.e.), and SlugFest. His poems have been translated into French, Spanish, Romanian, Chinese, Serbian, Croatian, Slovene, Japanese, Bulgarian, German, Italian, Portuguese, Greek, Crimean Tatar, Arabic, Persian, Esperanto, Kannada, Tamil, Hindi, Punjabi, Telugu, and Bangla. His poems featured in the poetry anthology, The Dance of the Peacock: An Anthology of English Poetry from India, featuring 151 Indian English poets, edited by Vivekanand Jha and published by Hidden Brook Press, Canada.

Books by Professor Singh include Savitri : A Spiritual Epic (Criticism, 1984); My Silence (poems, 1985); Sound and Silence (edited articles on Krishna Srinivas, 1986); Indian English Writing, 1981-1985: Experiments with Expression (ed., 1987, rept. 1991); Using English in Science and Technology (textbook, 1988, rev. and rept, 2000); Recent Indian English Poets : Expressions and Beliefs (ed. 1992); Two Poets: R.K. Singh (I DO NOT QUESTION) Ujjal Singh Bahri (THE GRAMMAR OF MY LIFE) (poems, 1994); General English Practice (textbook, 1995); Anger in Action : Explorations of anger in Indian writing in English (ed.,1997); My Silence, and other selected poems, (poems, 1996); Above the Earth's Green (poems, 1997); Psychic Knot : Search for Tolerance in Indian English Fiction (ed., 1998); New Zealand Literature : Some Recent Trends (ed.,1998); Multiple-Choice General English for UPSC Competitive Exams (textbook, 2001); Cover to Cover (poems, 2002), Communication : Grammar and Composition (textbook, 2003), Sri Aurobindo's Savitri : Essays on Love, Life and Death (Critical articles, 2005), Teaching English for Specific Purposes : An Evolving Experience (Research articles and review essays, 2005), Voices of the Present: Critical Essays on Some Indian English Poets (2006), English as a Second Language: Experience into Essays (ed. research articles, 2007), English Language Teaching: Some Aspects Recollected (ed. research articles, 2008), Sexless Solitude and Other Poems (2009), and Mechanics of Research Writing (2010).

Also known as, R.K.Singh, he is a prominent name in the Indian English Haiku genre. With his haiku anthologies, namely Every Stone Drop Pebble (1999), Peddling Dreams (A part of trilogy Pacem in Terris collection of poems in English and Italian, jointly with Myriam Pierri and Giovanni Campisi, English/Italian, 2003), The River Returns (2006), Sense and Silence: Collected Poems (2010), New and Selected Poems Tanka and Haiku (2012), I Am No Jesus and Other Selected Poems Tanka and Haiku (English/Crimean Tatar, 2014), God Too Awaits Light(Cholla Neddles, September 2017), Growing Within - Desavarsire launtrica: haiku, tanka and other poems (Constanta: Anticus Press, 2018), THERE'S NO PARADISE And Other Selected Poems Tanka & Haiku (French Edition, Editions Muse, 3 April 2019), Tainted With Prayers: Contaminado con Oraciones (English/Spanish, Kindle/Amazon, 10 January 2020), Silencio: Blanca desconfianza: Silence: White Distrust (Spanish/English, Kindle/Amazon, 1 March 2021), Against the Waves: Selected Poems (New Delhi: Authors Press, May 2021), COVID-19 And Surge of Silence/Kovid-19 Hem Sessízlík Tolkȋnȋ (English/Tatar, Constanta: Anticus Press, 2021), Hakudaku: Silence: A White Distrust (English/Japanese, Kindle/Amazon, 18 October 2021), Lantern In The Sky: Selected Haiku (English/French, Calameo.com, 12 March 2022), Poems and Micropoems (Arizona: Southern Arizona Press, 14 February 2023), Knocking Vistas And Other Poems (New Delhi: Authors Press, 17 March 2024), 44 Twin Steps Constanta-Yokohama 1977-2021: Photo-Haiku Anthology, compiled by Yusuke Miyake, Alexandra Flora Munteanu, Laura Vaceanu and Taner Murat, Hindi Translation by Ram Krishna Singh with a video book by Priti Singh, Constanta: Anticus Press, August 11, 2025) , Leaves of Silence: Poems and Micropoems (New Delhi: Authors Press, 7 October 2025), and Drifty Silence And She: Selected Poems & Micropoems (Capri Leone, Italy: Edizioni Universum, 30 November, 2025). Dr Singh has tried to concretize the haiku images of self-effacing nature; oriented haiku with subjective, surreal and mythic elements, the emergent social and political consciousness, validating and exemplifying haiku practices in India. He has used Indian kigo, images, and experiences in his haiku. He doesn't differentiate between haiku and senryu.

== Awards and honors ==
In recognition of his achievements Professor Singh has received several awards and honours, among them:

- Honorary Litt.D. from the World Academy of Arts and Culture, Taiwan, 1984;
- Fellowship of the International Poets Academy, Madras, 1987;
- Fellowship of the International Writers and Artists Association, U.S.A.1988;
- Michael Madhusudan Award, Calcutta, 1994;
- Poet of the Year Award for 1995 from the Canadian Alumni of the World University, Ontario, 1996;
- Ritsumeikan University Peace Museum Award, Kyoto, 1999;
- Certificate of Honour and Nyuusen Prize in Kumamoto International Kusamamoto Haiku Competition, Japan, 2000 and 2008;
- Diploma of Author of the Year Award, Trento, Italy, 2002;
- Ambassador-India, Poets of the World, Chile, 2008;
- Lifetime Achievement Award, Chennai, 2009;
- Distinguished Membership of The International Association of Poets, Writers and Artists (IAPWA), Albania, 2012;
- Prize of Korea Literature, Korea, 2013;
- Special Award Diogen, 2013;
- Nazar Look Prize for Poetry, Romania, 2013;
- Nominated for XXXIX Pushcart Prize,2013, 2014;
- Winner of Naji Naaman's Literary Prize for 2015
