= Bharti Kashyap =

Indian ophthalmologist

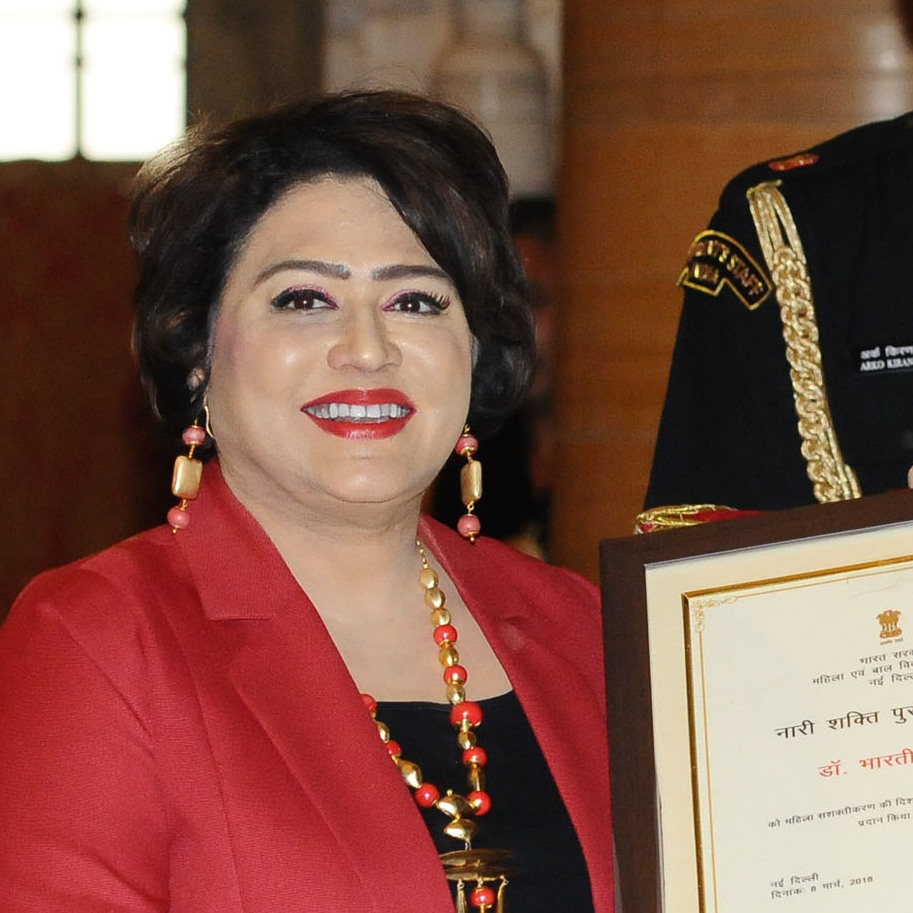
- Born: May 15, 1967 (age 58)
- Occupation: ophthalmologist
- Spouse: Birendra Prasad Kashyap

Bharti Kashyap is an Indian ophthalmologist and social worker. She was honoured with Nari Shakti Puraskar in 2017 and is a five-time recipient of the National IMA for the welfare of the underprivileged section of social sciences.

== Personal life ==
Kashyap was born on May 15, 1967. She studied MBBS, MS (Ophthalmology) and Fellow in Cornea. She married Birendra Prasad Kashyap who established Kashyap Memorial Eye Hospital in Ranchi, Jharkhand.

== Career ==
Kashyap worked extensively for the education of children suffering from visual impairment such as detective cataract, refractive error, etc by providing free treatment. She began social work in 1995, after discovering the increasing incidence of blindness in Jharkhand children, causing high dropout rates. She conducted a sample eye screening of some 10,000 children enrolled in state run schools at Ramgarh. She organised free eye camps to address the main causes of avoidable blindness.

She completed eye screening of more than 20 lakh children enrolled in state run schools of the state. She expanded to target underprivileged people, primitive tribes, victims of human trafficking, newspaper hawkers, diabetics, old age home residents, slum dwellers, and mentally disturbed people, to sportswomen and truck drivers. Free eye camps were organised in every block and district of Jharkhand with Kashyap Memorial Eye Bank, the charitable trust that she founded. The most noticeable impact was the return of children to school after receiving free eye glasses and free phaco cataract surgery at charitable wing- Kashyap Memorial Eye Bank.

In 2015, as Chairperson, Women Doctors’ Wing Indian Medical Association, she launched the first major offensive in Jharkhand against cervical cancer, the number one killer of women, by organising a series of Mega Women Health Camps focussing on Cervical Cancer Detection and Colposcopy Guided Cryo Treatment at the camp site throughout rural Jharkhand and in State run Sadar Hospitals. Joining hands with the state health department, she helped rope in onco-gynaecologists from Kolkata and New Delhi to provide training to gynaecologists working with state health services on early detection and treatment of cervical precancer.

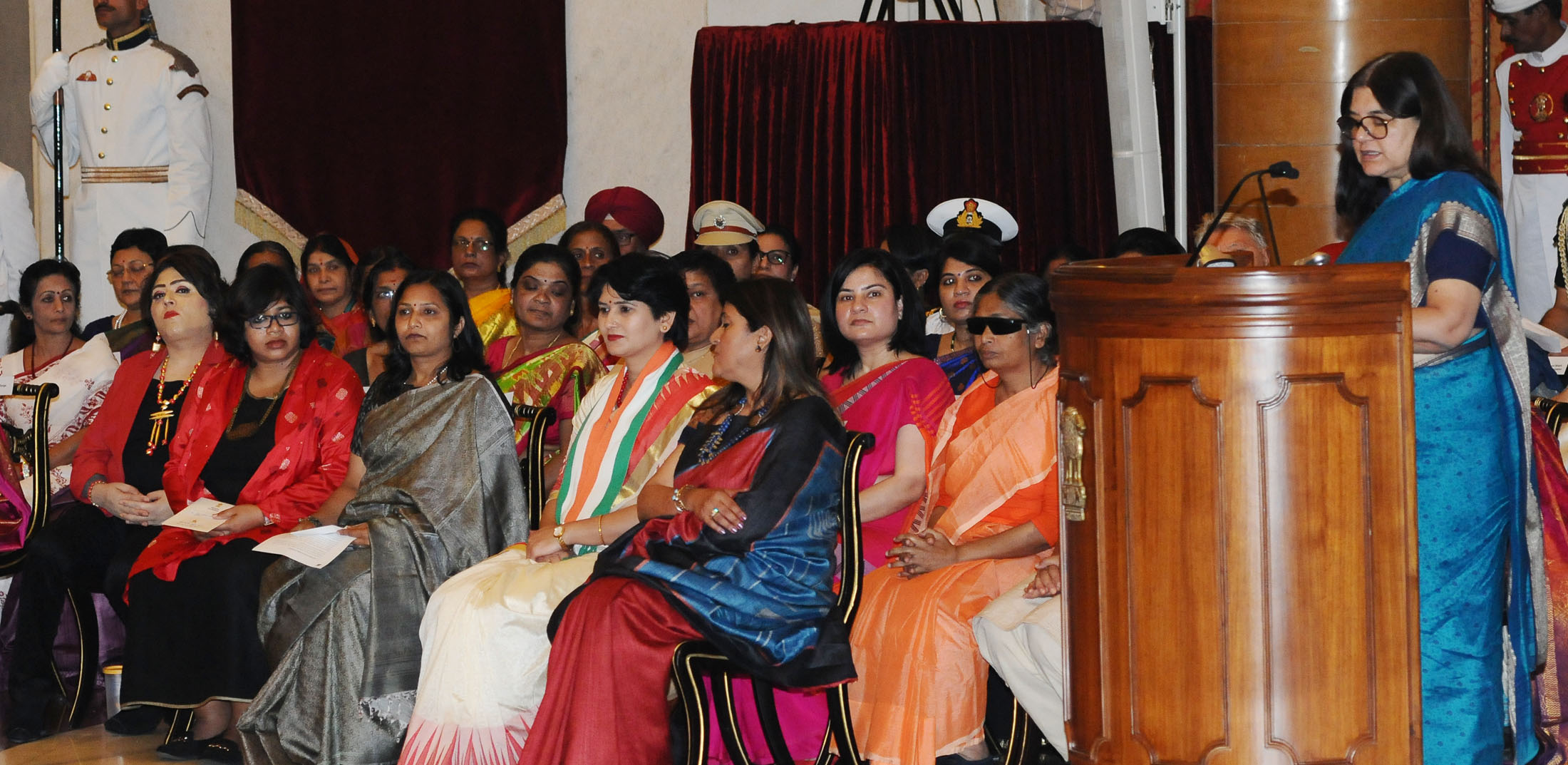
Maneka Sanjay Gandhi talking at the presentation of the Nari Shakti Puruskar for 2017 (in 2018) - Kashyap is to the left

Her efforts, the first in Jharkhand, brought quality health care to women in rural areas, saving thousands from cervical cancer.
