= Chami Murmu =

Indian environmental activist

Padma Shri Chami Murmu
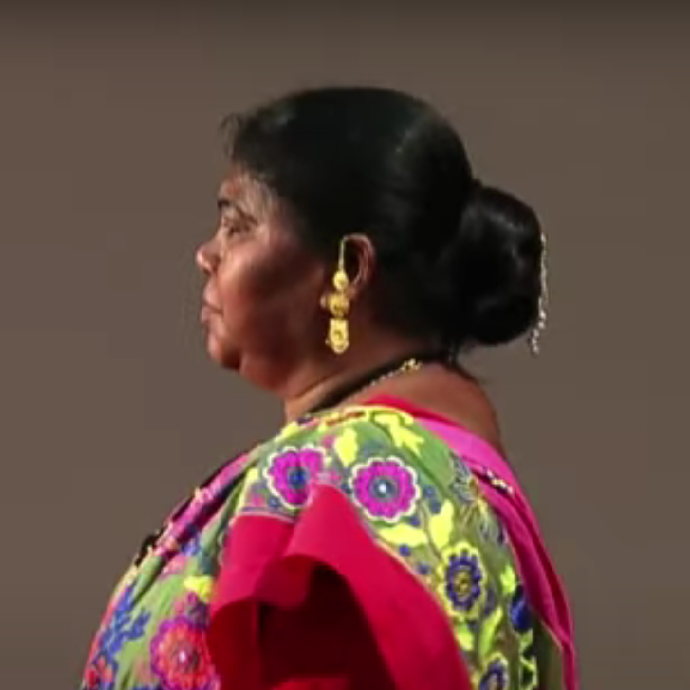
- Born: 1973 (age 52–53); Bagraisai, Rajnagar, Seraikela Kharsawan, Jharkhand, India
- Known for: Planting 2.5 million saplings
- Awards: Nari Shakti Puraskar

Chami Murmu (born in 1973) is an Indian environmental activist and is known for planting trees in India. She had planted 2,500,000 trees in India till she was awarded the Nari Shakti Puraskar in 2019.

== Biography ==
Murmu was born about 1973, she is from Bagraisai village in Rajnagar block of the Seraikela Kharsawan district.

In about 1996, Murmu began to plant trees. Over the next 24 years she was involved with planting 2.5 million trees. These trees are saplings around her village that are required to replace trees that have been felled by "mafia". They are working despite the troubles with Naxalites. In 2020 she was the secretary from an organisation, Sahayogi Mahila Bagraisai, that champions her work and it has 3,000 members

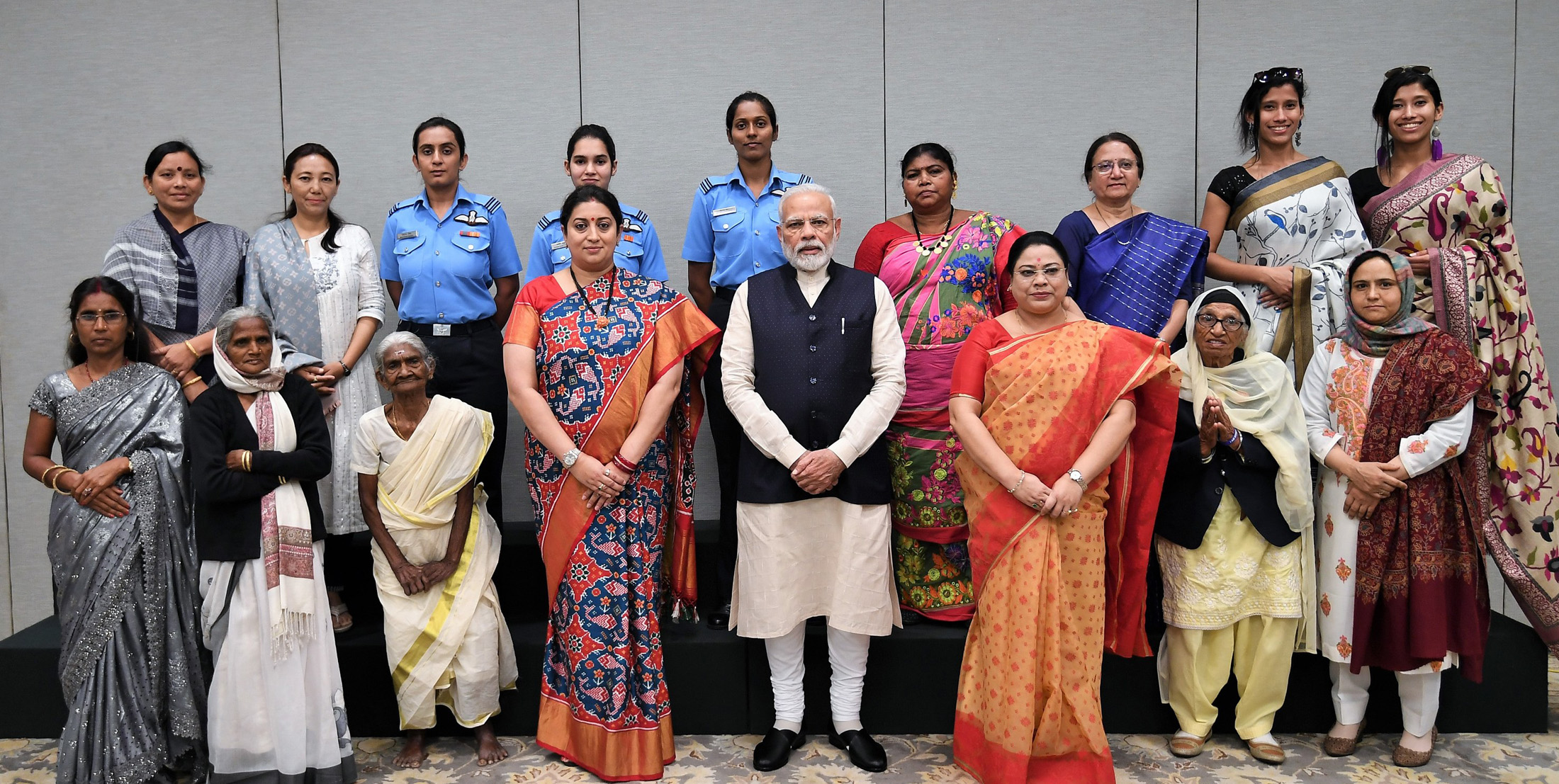
Prime Minister Narendra Modi with the Nari Shakti Awardees on International Women's Day in 2020.

In March 2020 Murmu was in New Delhi on International Women's Day where the President Kovind presented twelve Nari Shakti Puraskar awards and Murmu was one of those chosen. Later that month Murmu announced that she and Jamuna Tudu were to join forces to protect Jharkhand's forests. They were called "the Lady Tarzans" in the press. Jamuna Tuda has 300 members in her organisation and together they hope to find more synergy.

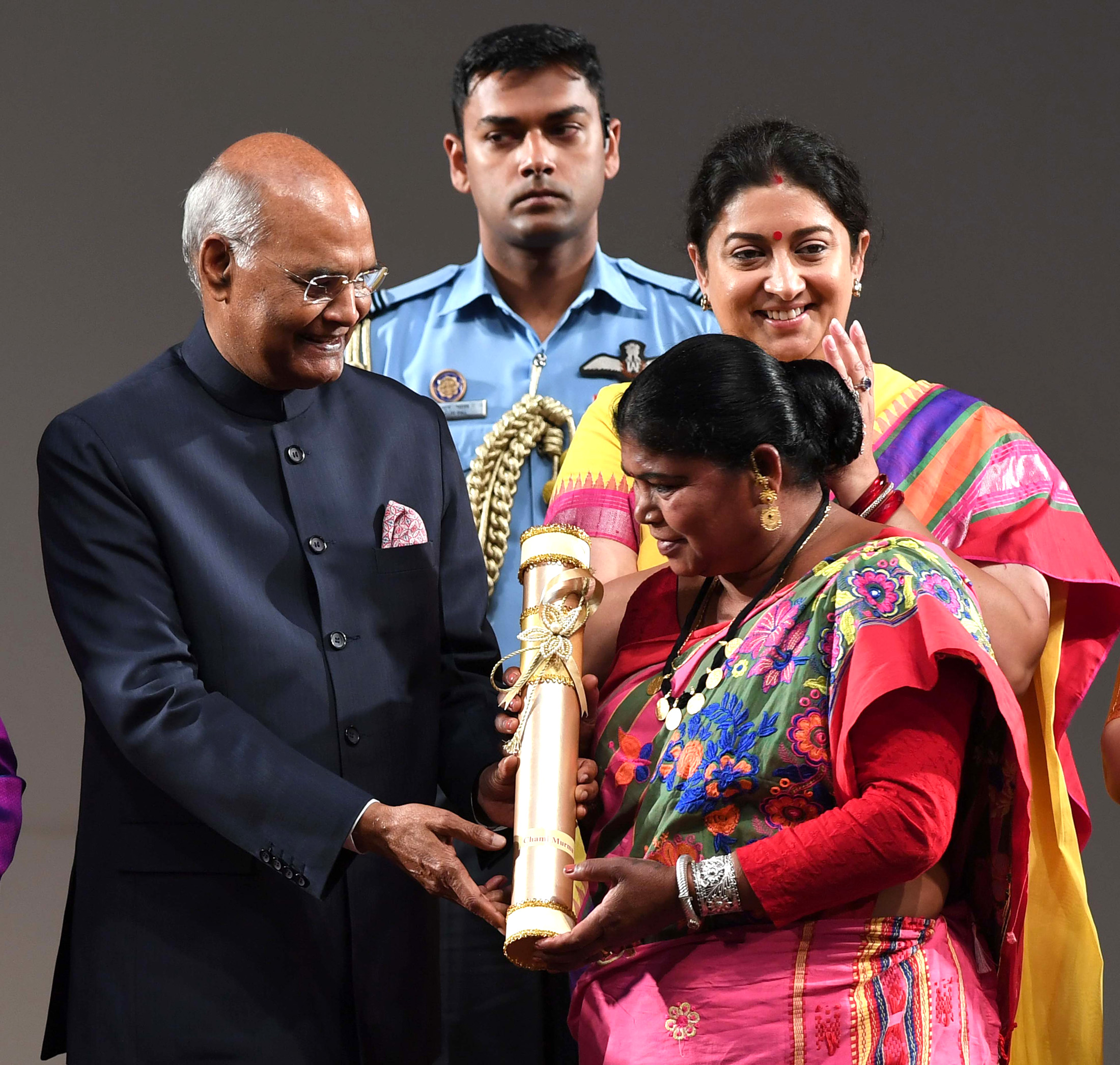
Shri Ram Nath Kovind presenting the Nari Shakti Puruskar for the year 2019 to Smt. Chami Murmu

== Awards ==
- Indira Priyadarshini Vrikshamitra Awards, 1996
- Nari Shakti Puraskar, 2019
- Padma Shri Award, 2024
