= Chetan Joshi =

Indian flute musician

Chetan Joshi is a noted flautist in the Hindustani classical music tradition. He was born in Jharia and brought up at Noamundi and Bokaro Steel City. He was trained under Late Acharya Jagadish (Bokaro), Late Pandit Bholanath Prasanna (Allahabad), Late Pandit Raghunath Seth (Mumbai) and Pandit Ajoy Chakravorty (Kolkata).

== Early life ==
He was born in Jharia of Dhanbad district in Bihar (now Jharkhand). His father Bhupendra Joshi was a trader of tea. He completed his matriculation from Ramchndra High School and college from Allahabad Degree College, Prayagraj. He completed his graduation from Bokaro College.

== Career ==
He started playing flute as a music teacher in 1987 in Guru Gobind Singh School. Then he was a music teacher at Delhi Public School from 1988 to 2012. From 2012, he played flute in different shows from Noida.

== Performances ==
As one of the leading classical instrumentalists from Delhi, Chetan Joshi has performed in various concerts over the last thirty years.

He gave his performance along with a Japanese artist for a programme named Venu Naad (sound of flute) in a series of Jugalbandi concerts organised in the first and second week of December 2004 in places like Hazaribagh, Dhanbad, Bokaro, Ranchi, Munger and Kolkata. He has also performed Jugalbandi with Santoor, Violin, Guitar, Sitar, Sarod and Flute artists from various parts of the country.

His other performances include one at XLRI at Jamshedpur in 2006, at Rabindra Bhawan, Guwahati in 2008 and at IIM Ranchi in 2012.

In September 2016 Chetan Joshi performed in the 7th edition of Rasrang World Flute Festival, a five-day long international event held in New Delhi, in which artists from several countries like Italy, Slovakia and Afghanistan participated and where he was able to perform alongside other leading flautists of India like Hariprasad Chaurasia and Ronu Majumdar. The festival was especially linked with one of UN Sustainable Development Goals and it aimed to propagate world peace.

He performed in a special programme organised by Sanskar Bharti at Punjab Kala Bhawan on 8 April 2017.

He also performed in a special program organised by Skoolz with the celebrity show host Mrs. NIDHI KUMAR on Sunday, 04 Dec 2022.

== Awards ==
He has been awarded with Rajakiya Sanskritik Samman (State honor) by the Government of Jharkhand. He has also been awarded Sur Mani, Bismillah Samman, Sangeet Kala Gaurav Award, Kala Ratna Sammaan, Sangam Sammaan and many other awards and accolades. He was awarded Sangeet Natak Akademi Award for the year 2019.
