= Swati Ghosh =

Indian artist

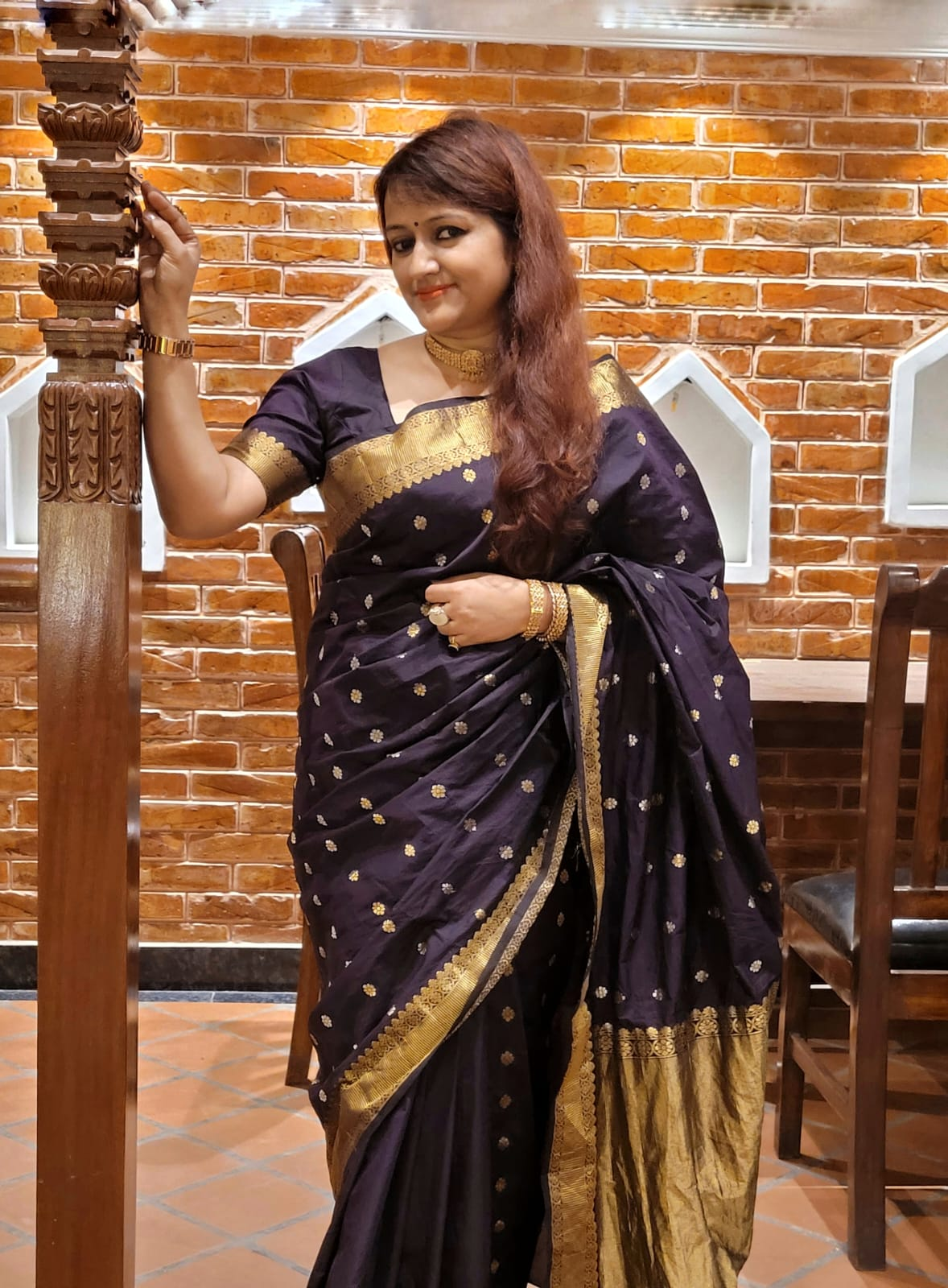
- Swati Ghosh in 2025
- Born: Swati Roy Chowdhury; 28 July 1983 (age 43); Jamshedpur, Jharkhand, India
- Known for: Painting; drawing; Fine Art
- Website: www.swatighoshart.com

Swati Ghosh (born 28 July 1983) is an Indian artist. She is known for depictions of peace and freedom in her artworks.

Ghosh is the first woman art judge from India by the International Council of Arts Federation, and appointed as Cultural Ambassador by International Council of Museums Asia Pacific for Geoje International Art Festival. She also honored as Judge by IWPG and guest at HWPL world peace summit in South Korea.

Swati's paintings have been displayed numerous museums worldwide, including the Palazzo Della Cancelleria in Rome, Snai San Siro Hippodrome in Milan, Italy, Chiesa Santa Maria Dei Miracoli Rome, Salon International D'art Contemporizing Carrousel Du Louvre in Paris, Palazzo d'Accursio in Bologna and other places.

== Early life and education ==
Ghosh (former name, Swati Roy Chowdhury) was born on 28 July 1983 in the city of Jamshedpur (Jharkhand) India to Partha Sarathi Ray Chaudhuri (father) who was a senior auditor in the Field Gun Factory, Govt. of India in Kanpur and Parna Roy Chowdhury (mother). Her family lived in Armapur Estate, Kanpur until Swati married a Merchant Navy Engineer named Prasenjit Ghosh and moved to Kolkata. She has a son named.

== Career ==
Ghosh was selected as judge for the 7th and 8th Geoje International Art Festival in Haegeumgang Theme Museum in South Korea in 2021 and 2022 by International Culture and Arts Federation (ICAF) as a first Indian women judge in South Korean museum for an art festival. At the same time in 2021 she was appointed as Cultural Ambassador for the 7th Geoje International Art Festival in South Korea by ICOM International Council of Museums ASPAC during her work as judge in the museum.

== Notable Exhibition ==
- 2023: PASOLINI e, l'arte Mostra D'arte Contemporanea, Milano Art Gallery, Milan, Italy
- January 2024 Exhibition PremioTeodorico 2, Venice, ITALY
- October 2023 Biennale Internazionale at Pescara, ITALY

== Awards ==
- In September 2025, Ghosh honored as Judge by IWPG and guest at HWPL world peace summit in South Korea.
- The Diplôme de Médaille d'Étain award 2024 in Paris
- Médaille d'honneur du travail award 2024 in Paris
- Arte and Cavallo Trofeo 2022 in Milan, Italy
- Swati Ghosh was featured into 'World’s 100 Women Artists,' which was appeared on the screen of Times Square, New York in the event held from 20 June to 30 June in Bologna, Italy.
