= Balbir Dutt =

Indian journalist

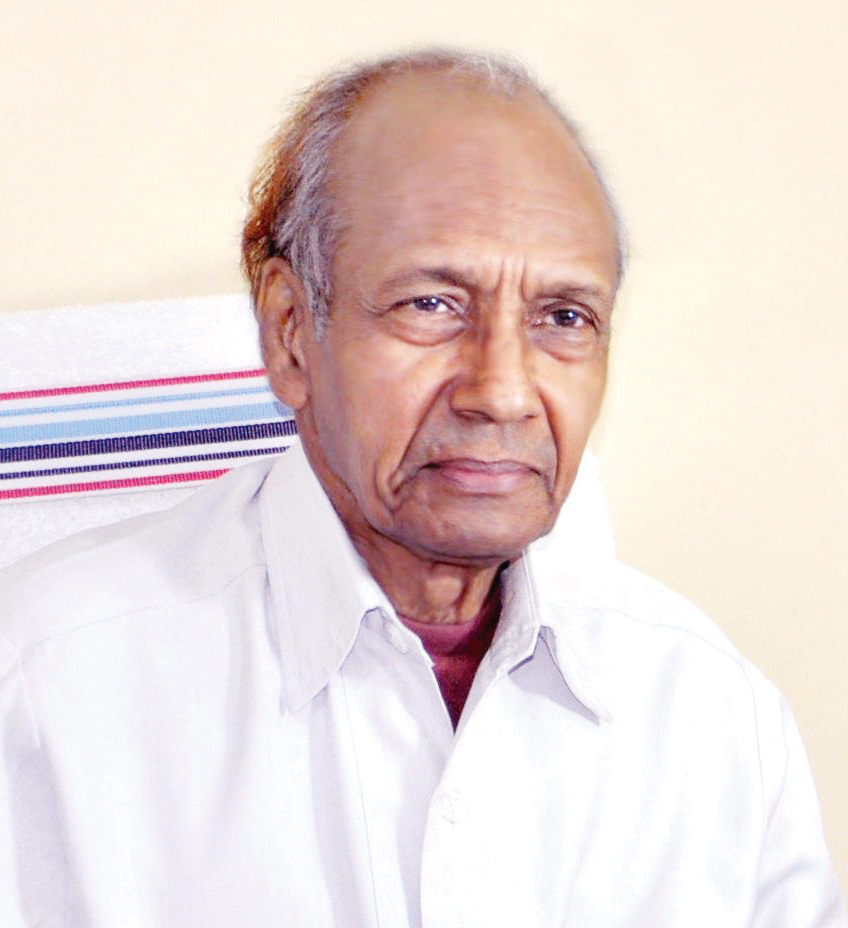
- Born: Balbir Dutt; 31 May 1935 (age 90); Rawalpindi, British India
- Occupation: Journalist
- Children: Rohit Dutt
- Awards: Padma Shri; Lifetime Achievement Award
- Website: balbirdutt.com

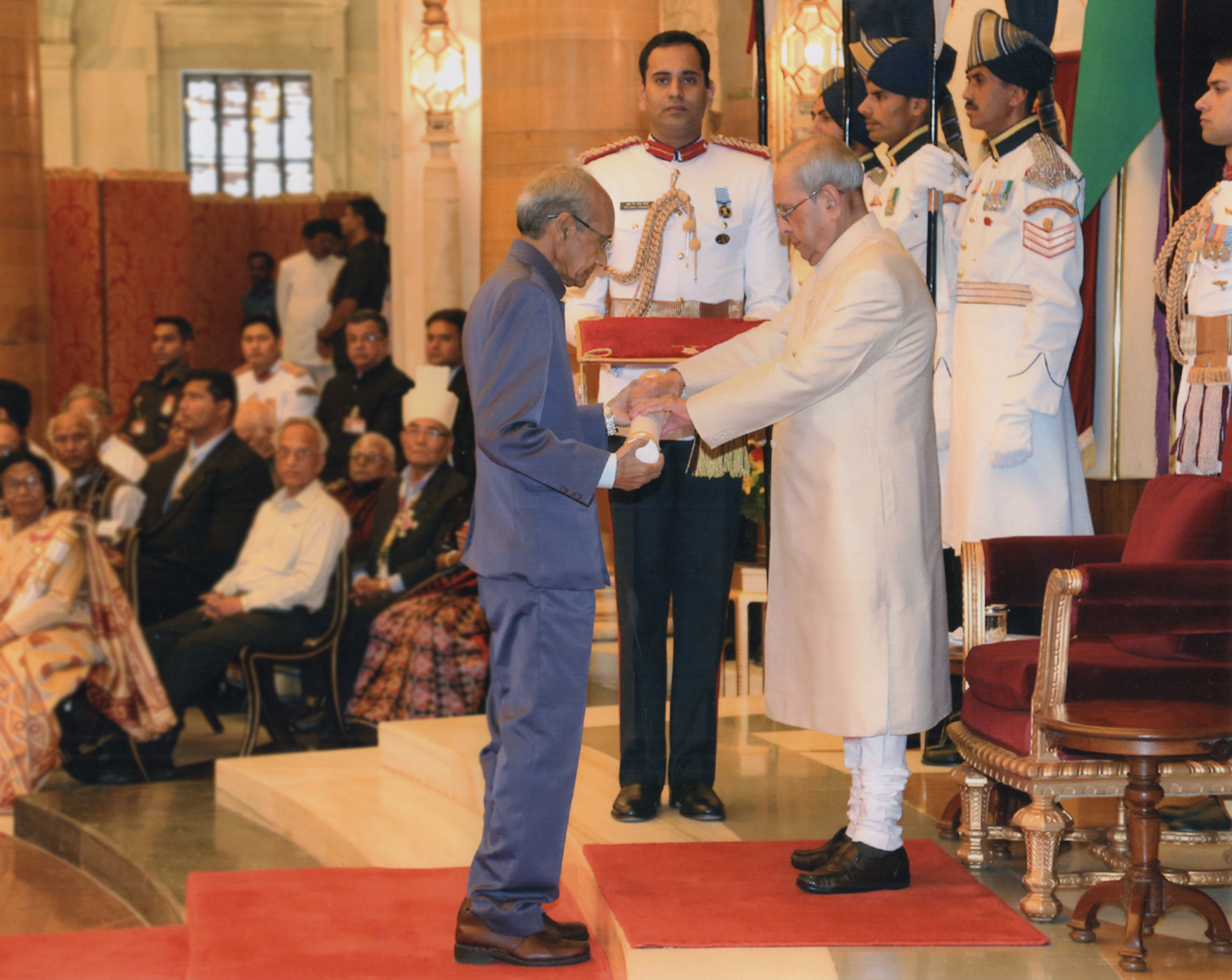
Balbir Dutt receiving Padma Shri Award

Balbir Dutt is a veteran Indian journalist. He is the Founder and Chairman of Hindi daily Desh Pran. He is also the author of several scholar books. Dutt is the recipient of prestigious Padma Shri award. Dutt, at present, is the most experienced active journalist in India. He is into active journalism for last 62 years.

== Early life ==
He was born in Rawalpindi in British India to a prominent and scholar family. His father Shri Shivdas Dutt was a renowned businessman in Rawalpindi. His studies and upbringing took place in Rawalpindi, Dehradun, Ambala and Ranchi.

== Career ==
Dutt started journalism in Ranchi and became editor of "Ranchi Express" in 1963. He edited weekly "Jai Matrubhumi" and daily "Desh Pran". He has been a writer and columnist in many newspapers and magazines. He is a member of, working Committee of South Asia Free Media Association, South Asian Association for Regional Cooperation. He is also a member of the "Editors guild of India" and "National Union of Journalists". He has taught editorial journalism and newspaper management in Ranchi University as a Guest Lecturer for 25 years.

== Works ==
Balbir Dutt has written several books namely "Kahani Jharkhand Andolan Ki", Safarnama Pakistan", "Jaipal Singh: Ek Romanchak Ankahi Kahani, Emergency ka Kahar aur Censor ka Zahar, Bharat Vibhajan aur Pakistan ke Shadyantra and Datan-E-Pakistan. He is currently working on several books on Jharkhand, Politics, Journalism and Partition of India

== Awards and recognition ==
Dutt is the recipient of "Rashtriya Patrakarita Puraskar", "Patrakarita Shikhar Samman", "Jharkhand Gaurav Samman", "Krantikari Patrakarita Puraskar", "Lifetime Achievement Award" by Government of Jharkhand, Times Business Award, "Mahanayak Sharda Samman". In 2017, He was honoured with Padma Shri by Pranab Mukherjee, the then President of India for his distinct achievements in the field of journalism.
