= Madhu Mansuri Hasmukh =

Indian singer and activist (born 1948)

Madhu Mansoori Hasmukh
- Born: 4 September 1948; Similia, Ranchi, Bihar (now Jharkhand), India
- Occupation(s): operator, Singer, Songwriter, activist
- Spouse: Samia Oraon
- Parent: Abdul Rahman Mansoori (father)
- Awards: Padma Shri (2020); Jharkhand Ratna Award (2011); Jharkhand Bibhuti Award

Madhu Mansoori Hasmukh (born 4 September 1948) is an Indian singer, songwriter and activist. He had written and sung several Nagpuri songs for movement of separate state Jharkhand. In 2011, the Government of Jharkhand awarded him Jharkhand Ratna Award. In 2020, he received Padma Shri in field of Arts.

== Personal life ==
Madhu Mansuri Hasmukh was born on 4 September 1948 in similia in Ranchi district. His father name was Abdul Rahman Mansuri. According to Madhu Mansuri, his ancestors were Oraon who were converted to Islam. He married Samia Oraon.

== Career ==
Hasmukh was operator in MECON. He learned traditional song from his father. He had started singing songs from his childhood. He sang first song in stage in 1960 at the age of twelve. He established Shist Manch in 1960 and his first book of Nagpuri songs got published. In 1972 he wrote "Nagpur kar Kora" song. In 1992, he traveled Taiwan with Ram Dayal Munda and Mukund Nayak. He had written and sung several Nagpuri songs for movement for separate Jharkhand state.

== Awards and recognition ==
Government of Jharkhand awarded him Jharkhand Bibhuti Award. In 2011, Government of Jharkhand awarded him Jharkhand Ratna Award. In 2020, he received Padma Shri in field of Arts.
