= Simon Oraon =

Indian environmentalist and social worker

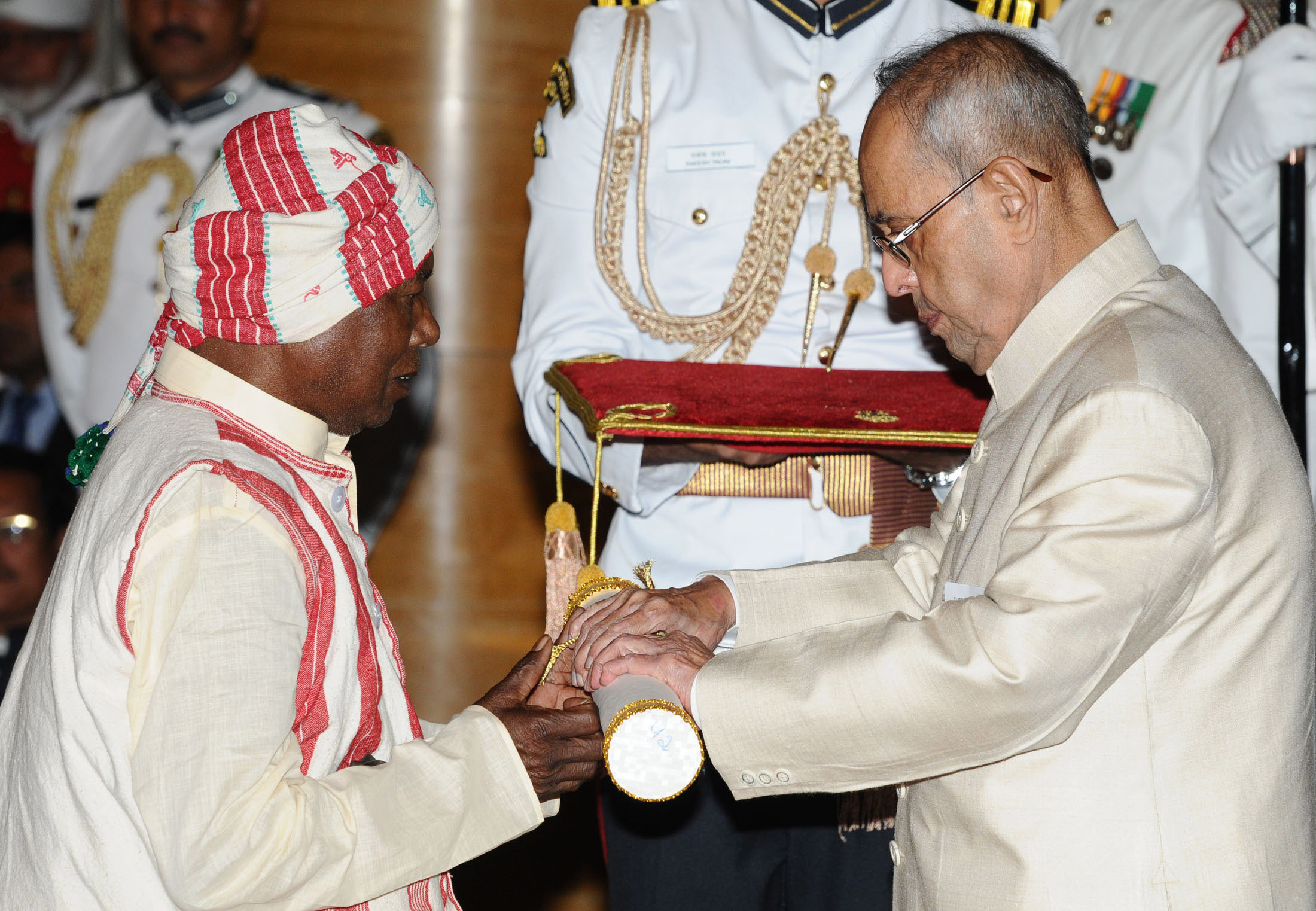
- The President, Shri Pranab Mukherjee presenting the Padma Shri Award to Shri Simon Oraon, at a Civil Investiture Ceremony, at Rashtrapati Bhavan, in New Delhi on April 12, 2016
- Born: Khaksi Toli, Jharkhand, India
- Other names: Waterman; Simon Baba
- Occupations: Environmentalist; Social worker
- Years active: Since 1961
- Known for: Environmental efforts
- Awards: Padma Shri; Prime Minister’s Rural Development Fellow

Simon Oraon Minj, popularly known as the Waterman of Jharkhand in the media and Simon Baba among his villagers, is an Indian environmentalist and social worker, who is known to have worked to combat drought in the state of Jharkhand. His efforts have been reported behind the construction of five irrigation reservoirs as well as an environmental project which included mass tree plantation and digging of wells and ponds in the Bero Block near Ranchi, covering 51 villages. The Government of India awarded him the fourth highest civilian honour of the Padma Shri, in 2016, for his contributions to society.

== Early life and education ==
Simon Oraon was born in Khaksi Toli village, a small village under the Bero Block, around 35 km away from Ranchi, in a catholic farmer's family and had school education only up to class IV.

== Work ==
Simon's villagers relied heavily on rainwater for their agriculture and did farming only for a limited period every year due to scarcity of water. This is known to have prompted Oraon in building a reservoir at the footsteps of the nearby hills which he did with the assistance of his fellow villagers in 1961. Though the initial attempt and the subsequent attempt the next year did not last long, the third dam, built with the help of local authorities survived and is providing irrigation assistance to the village to the day. This was followed by two more dams at Deshbali and Jharia and several ponds in the neighbouring villages of Hariharpur, Jamtoli, Khaksitoli, Baitoli and Bhasnanda. In all, he helped construct five check dams in the region.

In 1964, the villagers elected him as the Parha Raja (Chief of the tribe) and he initiated the social forestry program at his ancestral property which he continues, planting 1000 trees every year, to prevent soil erosion and depletion of water resources. He formed a 25-member village committee with the representation of all the nearby villages which administers the forestry drive. He also heads the people's movement which fights against deforestation and illegal felling of trees. His efforts are reported to have assisted in the cultivation of over 2000 acres of land, producing three crops a year and yielding 20,000 mt of vegetables annually. He served as the Prime Minister's Rural Development Fellow during 2012–14. The Government of India honored him with the civilian award of the Padma Shri in 2016.

== See also ==
- List of people from Jharkhand
