= Prabhat Khabar =

Indian Hindi language daily newspaper

- Founded: August 1984; 41 years ago Ranchi, Jharkhand
- Language: Hindi
- City: Ranchi, Patna, Kolkata
- Country: India
- Website: www.prabhatkhabar.com
- Free online archives: epaper.prabhatkhabar.com

Prabhat Khabar is a Hindi-language daily newspaper published in Jharkhand, Bihar and West Bengal, with circulation in some other states in India, including parts of Orissa. It was founded in August 1984 in Ranchi, in Bihar. With the formation of Jharkhand state in November 2000, Ranchi became the capital of Jharkhand. The newspaper is notable for reporting social issues and revealing scams, such as the Fodder Scam, which it began reporting on in 1992. Despite receiving threats, the newspaper wrote 70 reports on the scam and had four or five reporters reporting the story.

== History ==
Prabhat Khabar was founded in 1984 by S. M. Vinod, an experienced publisher from Nagpur. Vinod along with Gyan Ranjan, an Indian National Congress politician established Neutral Publishing Pvt. Ltd. and started publishing Prabhat Khabar under it.
