= List of Kathak dancers =

This is a list of the Sangeet Natak Akademi awards for the Indian classical dance form of Kathak, as well as gurus and well-known performers.

== Sangeet Natak Akademi awardees ==
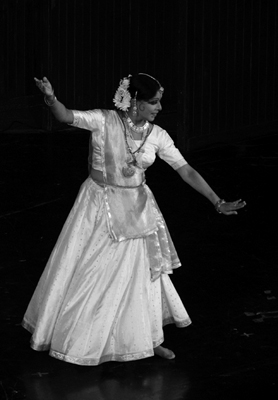
Dancer Shovana Narayan

- Shambhu Maharaj 1955
- Lacchu Maharaj 1957
- Sunder Prasad 1959
- Mohanrao Kallianpurkar 1962
- Birju Maharaj 1964
- Damayanti Joshi 1968
- Sitara Devi 1969
- Devilal 1974
- Roshan Kumari 1975
- Rohini Bhate 1979
- Pt. Kartik Ram, Kumudini Lakhia 1982
- Durga Lal 1984
- Uma Sharma 1987
- Reba Vidyarthi 1991
- Ramlal Bareth 1995
- Maya Rao 1989
- Rani Karnaa 1996
- Shovana Narayan 1999-2000
- Guru Surendra Saikia 2000
- Rajendra Gangani 2002
- Sunayana Hazarilal Agarwal, Urmila Nagar 2003
- Saswati Sen 2004
- Pt.Tirath Ram Azad 2005
- Munna Shukla 2006
- Geetanjali Lal 2007
- Shashi Sankhla 2008
- Prerana Shrimali 2009
- Malabika Mitra 2010
- Manjushree Chatterjee 2011
- Vijai Shankar 2012
- Rajashree Shirke 2013
- Uma Dogra 2014
- Jitendra Maharaj 2016
- Shobha Koser 2017
- Maulik Shah, Ishira Parikh 2018
- Puru Dadheech 2018
- Raghav Raj Bhatt & Mangala Bhatt 2019
- Kumkum Dhar 2020
- Nandkishore Kapote 2020
- Shama Bhate 2021
- Kamalini Asthana and Nalini Asthana 2022
- Jagdish Gangani 2023

== Padma awardees ==
- Shambhu Maharaj
- Damayanti Joshi
- Sitara Devi
- Uma Sharma
- Gopi Krishna (dancer)
- Roshan Kumari
- Birju Maharaj
- Kumudini Lakhia
- Shovana Narayan
- Sunayana Hazarilal
- Rani Karnaa
- Puru Dadheech
- Kamalini Asthana and Nalini Asthana

== Gharana founders ==
- Ishwari Prasad - Founder:Lucknow Gharana
- Raja Chakradhar Singh - Founder: Raigarh Gharana

== Lucknow gharana ==
The following is a list of the Gurus of the Lucknow Gharana, beginning with the disciples of Ishwari Prasad:

- Wajid Ali Shah (1822 – 1887, Nawab of Oudh and patron of the arts)
- Lachhu Maharaj
- Shambhu Maharaj
- Maya Rao
- Damayanti Joshi
- Birju Maharaj
- Ram Mohan Maharaj
- Sushmita Banerjee
- Maharaj Ghulam Hussain Kathak
- Saswati Sen
- Vibha Dadheech

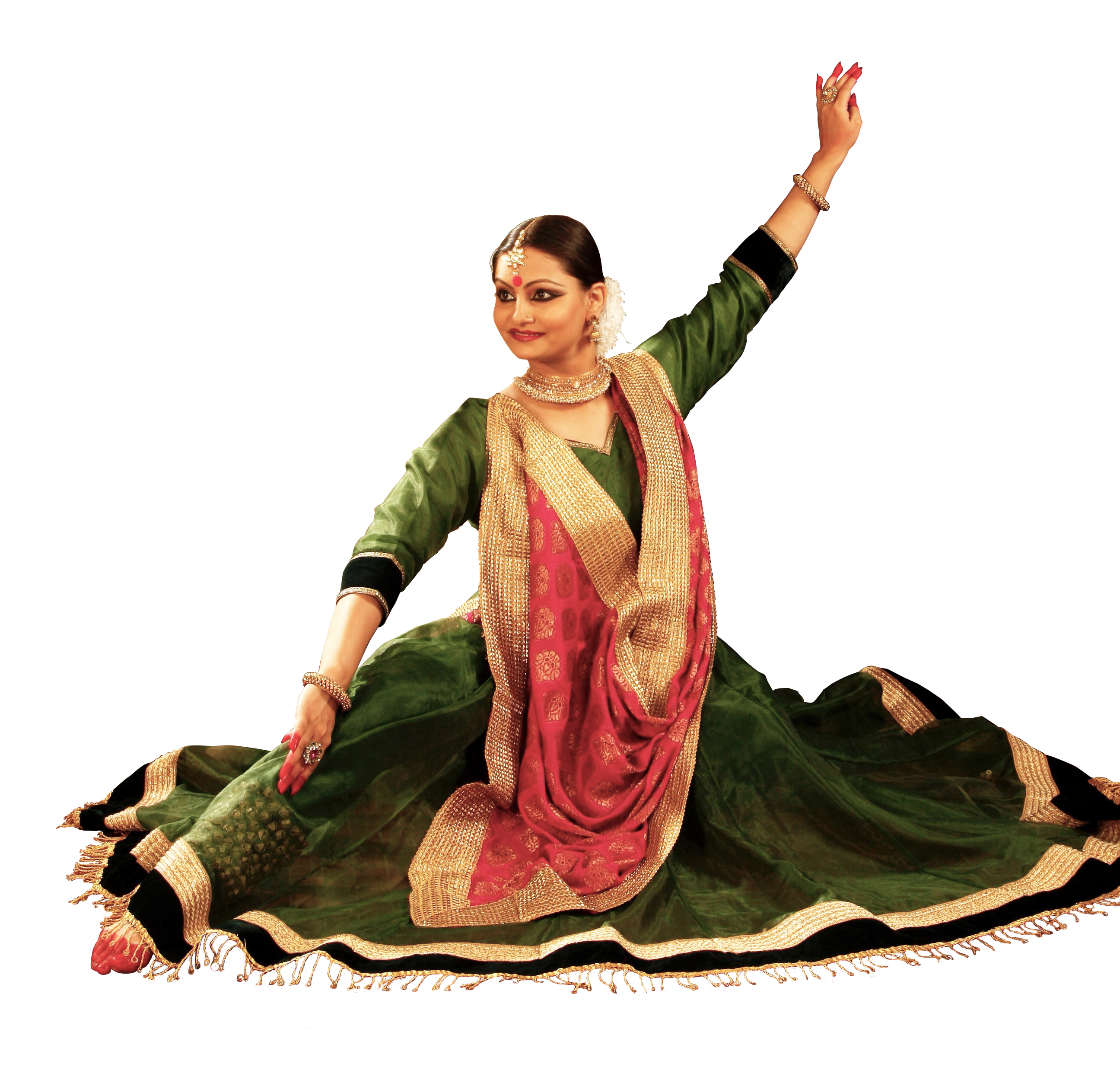
Kathak Dancer Namrata Rai

- Munna Shukla
- Nandkishore Kapote
- Mahua Shankar
- Shila Mehta
- Prerana Deshpande
- Gauri Jog
- Sushmita Banerjee
- Kumkum Dhar
- Papia Bhowmik
- Deepa Devasena
- Manjari Chaturvedi
- Pali Chandra
- Namrata Rai

== Jaipur gharana ==
- Sunder Prasad (Sundar Chunnilal Prasad)
- Puru Dadheech
- Mangala Bhatt
- Pandit Bhanuji Maharaj
- Kundan Lal Gangani
- Durga Lal-Devi Lal
- Geetanjali Lal
- Rajendra Gangani

== Banaras gharana ==
The following is a list of the gurus of the Benaras Gharana, beginning with the disciples of Janaki Prasad:

- Sitara Devi, daughter of Sukhdev
- Jitendra maharaj Disciple of Krishna Kumar maharaj
- Kamalini Asthana and Nalini Asthana
- Gopi Krishna

== Gurus (deceased) ==
- Damayanti Joshi
- Rohini Bhate
- Chitresh Das
- Rani Karnaa
- Maya Rao
- Birju Maharaj

== Current elder/senior gurus ==
- Roshan Kumari
- Puru Dadheech
- Nahid Siddiqui
- Kumudini Lakhia
- Maya Rao (1928-2014)
- Nirupama Rajendra
- Nandini Singh
- Geetanjali Lal
- Shama Bhate
- Prerana Shrimali
- Nandkishore Kapote
- Saswati Sen
- Rajendra Gangani
- Shovana Narayan
- Pali Chandra
- Prof.Purnima Pande
- Papia Bhowmik
- Marami Medhi

== Younger artists ==
- Maryada Kulshreastha
- Jaya Sharma
- Prerana Deshpande
- Manisha Gulyani
- Neha Pendse
- Akram Khan (dancer)
- Chitresh Das
- Satya Narayana Charka
- Cynthia Ling Lee
- Meenakshi J Kamath
- Swati S Kolle
- Meghranjani Medhi
- Anshika Kataria
- Manju Malkani
