= Meghranjani Medhi =

Indian Kathak dancer

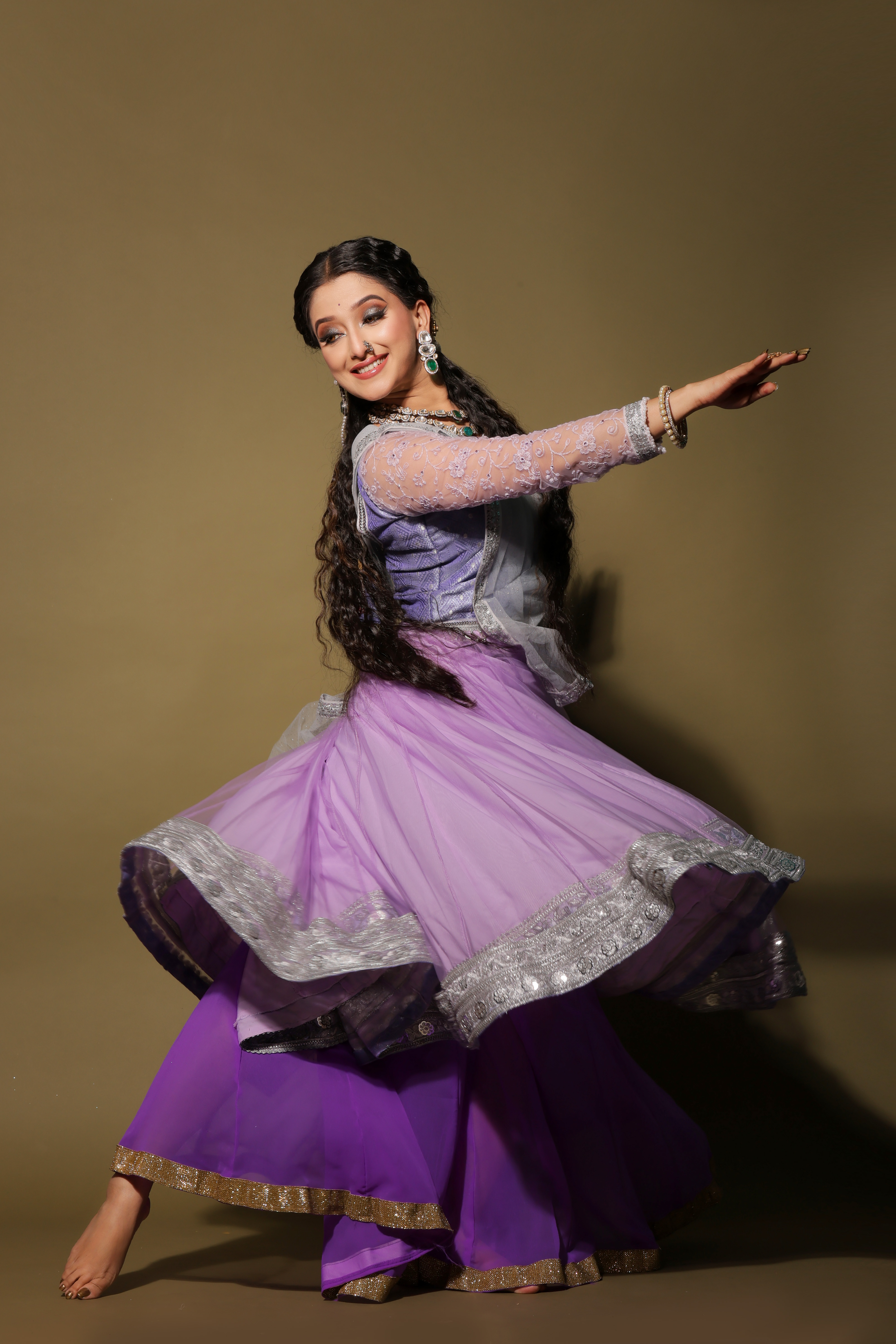
- Born: Assam, India
- Occupations: Kathak dancer, actress
- Spouse: Neil Das
- Parents: Joy Prakash Medhi (father); Marami Medhi (mother)
- Awards: Ustad Bismillah Khan Yuva Puraskar

Meghranjani Medhi is an Indian Kathak dancer and actress from Assam. In 2024 she received the Ustad Bismillah Khan Yuva Puraskar by Sangeet Natak Akademi for Kathak.

== Biography ==
Meghranjani Medi was born in Assam to singer, composer, and music director Joy Prakash Medi and Kathak dancer Marami Medhi. She began learning Kathak dance from her mother at the age of three. She later trained under the eminent Kathak dancers like Lucknow gharana guru Pandit Birju Maharaj and Jaipur gharana guru Pandit Rajendra Gangani. After completing Nrtiya Nipun degree in Kathak from Bhatkhande Sangeet Vidyapith, Lucknow, she done her master's degree in Kathak dance from Indira Kala Sangeet Vishwavidyalaya under Khairagarh University. In 2017, she completed Nrtiya Nipun degree in Sattriya dance from Sageet Satra Pariksha Parishad, Assam.

Currently, Meghranjani lives in Guwahati, Assam with her husband, Neil Das, who is also an artist.

== Dance career ==
Meghranjani started learning Kathak dance from her mother at the age of three and completed her Nritya Nipun degree in Kathak dance from Bhatkhande Sangeet Vidyapeeth, Lucknow in 2009. She has received scholarships from the Department of Culture, Government of India and the Centre for Cultural Resources and Training (CCRT) and was selected as an empanelled Artist for Kathak by the Indian Council for Cultural Relations (ICCR) in 2012.

Meghranjani, who performed with her mother all over India has also performed solo Kathak recitals at many prestigious events in India and abroad, including the Sadhana Festival of Dance in New Delhi, Kathak Mahotsav organized by National Institute of Kathak Dance, Pragjyoti International Dance Festival (in 2011, 2012, 2013 and 2014), Khajuraho Dance Festival (2014), Kala Ghoda Arts Festival (2015), Sarjaya Festival of Dance & Music (2013), Panch Tattva Festival, Mumbai, and World Dance Day in Chennai. She toured Egypt, Israel, Palestine and the UAE under the ICCR and also performed at the Fleck Dance Theatre of the Harbourfront Centre in Toronto in June 2011.

Together with her mother, Meghranjani runs a dance school named Sur Sangam in Guwahati.

== Acting career ==
Meghranjani started her acting career with the video film Lakhimi and later acted in films like Abhimani Mon, Poornima, Janmoni (Volume-I & II), Rumal and Kasijun. Her first full-length feature film was Anuradha, which released in 2015. Apart from this, she acted in the television mega serial Tumi Dusokut Kajol Lole and several TV commercials.

== Awards and honors ==
Meghranjani has won the gold medal at the Guwahati University Inter-College Youth Festival for three consecutive years starting in 2007. She received the Nebcus Media Award as the Best Actress for the video film Jaanmoni in 2010–2011. She received the Nirod Chaudhary Award for Best Actress for her performance in her first full-length feature film, Anuradha. In 2024 she received the Ustad Bismillah Khan Yuva Puraskar for Kathak for the year 2023. In 2025 January, she received the Kala Sadhak - The One Devoted to Art award.
