= Deepa Devasena =

Deepa Devasena (born Chidambaram, Tamil Nadu, India) is a Kathak dancer of the Lucknow Gharana style in the Greater Milwaukee Area, practicing since 2003. She is the artistic director of the "Arabhi School of Indian Dance".

Devasena is a trained BharatNatyam and Kathak dancer and teacher. She has studied under several prominent Kathak gurus, including Birju Maharaj, Saswati Sen, and gurus Nirupama and Rajendra Gangani. In August 2015 she successfully conducted a two-week Kathak workshop for her students under the guidance of Nirupama and Rajendra, and showcased it through the recital "Jhoom 2015".
