= Nandkishore Kapote =

Indian classical dancer (born 1956)

Dr. Nandkishore Kapote
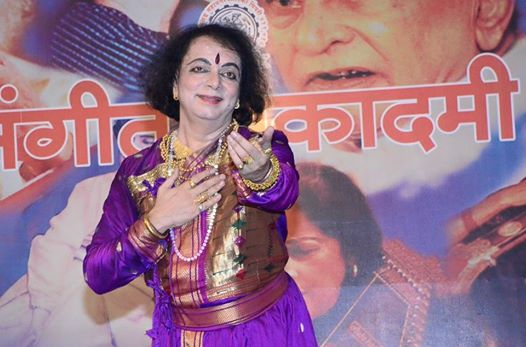
- Kapote performing Abhinaya on a bhajan in Pune, October 2015
- Born: 10 August 1956 (age 70); Maharashtra
- Education: Doctorate in Kathak, B.Com
- Alma mater: 2004 Tilak Maharashtra University PhD (under guidance of Pt. Birju Maharaj, Kathak Kendra, Delhi) 1977 Kathak Kendra Delhi – National Institute of Kathak Dance
- Known for: Indian Classical Dance form Kathak Artistic Director, Nandkishore Cultural Society
- Notable work: Book – Kathak Samrat Birju Maharaj
- Style: Kathak – Lucknow Gharana
- Awards: See Awards section below
- Website: www.nandakishorekapote.com

Nandkishore Kapote (born 10 August 1956) is an Indian Kathak dancer, teacher, choreographer and scholar associated with the Lucknow gharana. A senior disciple of Birju Maharaj, Kapote studied with him at Kathak Kendra in Delhi after receiving a Government of India scholarship for training in Kathak.

Kapote was named a recipient of the Sangeet Natak Akademi Award for 2020 for overall contribution and scholarship in the performing arts. He has also written several books on Kathak and Indian dance, including works on Birju Maharaj and the 2025 book Elements of Dance in Natyashastra and Abhinayadarpan.

== Academic career ==
Kapote began studying Kathak while young. In Pune, he trained under Munna Shukla, a nephew of Birju Maharaj, and first met Maharaj while still in school. After receiving a National Scholarship from the Government of India, he went to Delhi in 1978 to study under Maharaj. He became associated with Kathak Kendra and performed in productions choreographed by Maharaj.

Kapote later became a recognised Ph.D. guide in Kathak at Tilak Maharashtra University and at the Lalit Kala Kendra of the University of Pune. He has also served as a Ph.D. guide at the Sri Sri Centre for Advanced Research in Kathak at Sri Sri University.

Kapote founded the Nandkishore Cultural Society in Pune and later expanded its activities to Pimpri-Chinchwad. In 1998, the society established a performing-arts institute there, inaugurated by Birju Maharaj. He has served as artistic director of the society.

Kapote has also served as director of the Dr. D. Y. Patil School of Liberal Arts and as a member of the advisory committee of Kathak Kendra.

== Performance and choreography ==
Kapote has performed Kathak for Indian television, including Doordarshan's National Programme of Dance. The National Cultural Audiovisual Archives holds a recording of a recital by Kapote at the Bal Gandharva Ranga Mandir in Pune in 1991–92, featuring Vishnu Vandana, Draupadi Vastra Haran, a bhajan and a tarana.

He performed in a number of ballet productions choreographed by Birju Maharaj, including Katha Raghunathki, Hori Dhoom Machai, Roopmati-Baz Bahadur, Habba Khatun and Krishnayan. Kapote has also worked as a film choreographer, including on the Marathi film He Geet Jivanache.

== Publications ==
Kapote has written books dealing with Kathak, Birju Maharaj and Indian dance.

- Kathak Samrat – Birju Maharaj (Marathi). The book concerns the life and work of Birju Maharaj.
- Nritya Samrat Pt. Birju Maharaj (Hindi and English, 2021), ISBN 978-93-5473-457-1.
- Elements of Dance in Natyashastra and Abhinayadarpan (2025), published by the Bhandarkar Oriental Research Institute. The book examines traditional hand gestures described in the Natya Shastra and Abhinaya Darpana and their relationship to Kathak practice.

Kapote also co-wrote an introductory chapter on tribal dances of India in Encyclopaedic Profile of Indian Tribes.

== Recognition ==
Kapote received a National Scholarship from the Government of India for advanced study of Kathak under Birju Maharaj. His other honours have included the Maharashtra State Cultural Award, the Maharashtra government's Dr. Babasaheb Ambedkar Dalit Mitra Award and the Balgandharva Award of the Pune Municipal Corporation.

In 2017, he received a fellowship from the Government of India's Department of Culture to study hand gestures and Kathak in the Abhinaya Darpana. He was subsequently named one of the recipients of the Sangeet Natak Akademi Awards for 2020, receiving the award for overall contribution and scholarship in the performing arts.

Kapote has also been empanelled by the Indian Council for Cultural Relations.
