= Bhate =

Bhate (Marathi: भाटे) is a Marathi surname. Notable people with the name include:

- Anand Bhate (born 1971), Indian classical vocalist from the Kirana gharana.
- Rohini Bhate (1924–2008), the senior most Kathak dance exponents in India.
- Shama Bhate (born 1950), one among the Kathak exponents in India.
- Jaelem Bhate, Canadian conductor, composer, and bandleader
- Justice A.S. Bhate
