= Prerana Deshpande =

Indian Classical Dancer and choreographer

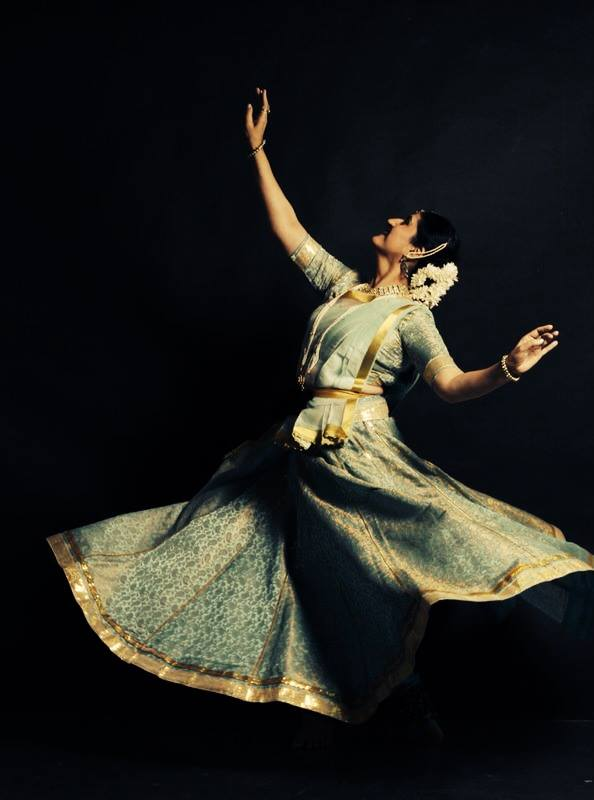
- Prerana Deshpande in a concert on 1 September 2016, at Mahaveer School Auditorium, Jaipur.
- Citizenship: Indian
- Education: Pune University
- Occupations: Classical Dancer, choreographer, researcher
- Organization: Nrityadham
- Style: Kathak
- Awards: Devadasi National Award (see all)

Prerana Deshpande is a recognized Indian exponent of Kathak dance.

She started to study Kathak under Sharadini Gole when she was seven years old. Her first performance was when she was fifteen years old. Then she studied Kathak under Guru-Shishya Parampara tradition from Rohini Bhate, of Lucknow and Jaipur gharanas for twenty two years. She is known for her graceful movements, and for mastery over various aspects of Kathak, such as abhinaya (expression) and command over the laya (rhythm).

Prerana Deshpande received her formal education at the Centre of Performing Arts of Pune University (Lalit Kala Kendra), India. She completed her master's degree in Kathak and stood first in the university. She also completed a bachelor's degree in Mathematics, and applies this formal mathematical knowledge to her dance.

In dedication to her art, Deshpande established Nrityadham, an institute for Kathak dance in Pune, where she teaches students from India and abroad, and has a stable group of advanced performers who participate in shows and festivals.

== Family ==
Prerana is married with the prominent tabla soloist Shri Supreet Deshpande. They have an only daughter, Ishwari Deshpande, who is also one of her advanced students in Nrityadham. Ishwari started to dance when she was three years old, around 1999, and she has stood out as a kathak dancer at least since her twelve years old.

== Creative collaboration ==
Creative collaboration named 'Mharo Pranam' on the life and lyrics of Meera Bai, conceptualized by Pt. Hemant Pendse with Kathak choreography by Prerana Deshpande.

In 2007, Prerana Deshpande collaborated with famous Odissi dancer Sujata Mohapatra in a Kathak - Odissi collaboration inspired by the World Heritage Site of Ajanta & Ellora. The production titled Ajanta Comes Alive - Tribute to Ajanta & Ellora premiered in the cultural capital of Maharastra, Pune, on 18 February 2007. Presented by dance scholar Sunil Kothari, this collaboration was subsequently staged in various cities of the country.

In 2010, Prerana and Sujata continued performing together. In 2018, Prerana premiered Space: Taal-mala, a long piece performed by the interpreters of Nrityadham, based on the rhythmic work of the dancer Pt. Mohanrao Kallianpurkar. For that premiere Ratikant Mohapatra was invited with his Odissi company.

== Awards ==
- 2016: Devadasi National Award
- Gaurav Puruskar at the hands of Pt. Birju Maharaj
- Singar Mani title, by the Sur Singar Samsad of Mumbai
- 1994: Nrityashri title, by Kiran, Katani

== See also ==
- List of Kathak exponents
- List of Indian women in dance
