= Kumkum Dhar =

Indian Kathak dancer (born 1956)

- Born: 4 February 1956 (age 70); Lucknow, Maharashtra, India
- Education: Lucknow University
- Occupations: Kathak dancer; dance teacher
- Awards: Sangeet Natak Akademi Award (2020); Yash Bharati (2015); Uttar Pradesh Sangeet Natak Akademi Award (1994)

Kumkum Dhar is a Kathak dancer and dance teacher from Lucknow, Uttar Pradesh, India. She received many awards including the Uttar Pradesh Sangeet Natak Akademi Award (1994), and the Yash Bharati (2015) by the Uttar Pradesh Government and the Sangeet Natak Akademi Award (2020) for Kathak.

== Biography ==
Kumkum Dhar is on 4 February 1956 at Lucknow , Uttar Pradesh . Later she moved to Lucknow in Uttar Pradesh and trained in Kathak there under noted Kathak exponent Lachhu Maharaj of the Lucknow gharana.

Dhar completed Bachelor of Arts in 1974 and Master of Arts in 1976 from Lucknow University. She also completed sangeet visharad degree in music and also holds a Doctorate in Economics. After completing Masters in Economics, she worked for 25 years as an economist with a consultancy firm.

== Career ==
Kumkum Dhar started performing Kathak in 1972. Apart from numerous venues and dance festivals in India, Dhar has also performed several solo dance shows in countries like USA, UK, Egypt, Kuwait, Mexico, Guatemala, and Bangladesh. She excels in both 'Tandava' (vigorous/ masculine) and 'Lasya' (soft/ feminine) modes of Kathak.

Dhar who worked as a professor in Bhatkhande Sanskriti Vishwavidyalaya, Lucknow, also served as the Dean of Faculty of Dance and later as vice-chancellor of Bhatkhande Sanskriti Vishwavidyalaya.

She has also trained more than 500 disciples under the Guru–shishya tradition. She is a Top-grade artist of Doordarshan, and an 'Outstanding Artist' of Indian Council for Cultural Relations.

Other than career in Kathak dance, Dhar also worked as radio jockey, television artist, actor and singer.

== Awards and honors ==
Kumkum Dhar received hundreds of awards including the Uttar Pradesh Sangeet Natak Akademi Award (1994), and the Yash Bharati by the Uttar Pradesh Government (2015) and the Sangeet Natak Akademi Award (2020) for Kathak by the Sangeet Natak Akademi, Government of India. In 2024 she received the Bharat Muni Award.
