= Rohini Bhate =

Indian dancer

Guru Rohini Bhate
- Born: 14 November 1924; Patna, Bihar, India
- Died: 10 October 2008 (aged 83); Pune, Maharashtra
- Education: Fergusson College
- Occupations: Classical dancer, choreographer, writer, researcher
- Organization: Nrityabharati Kathak Dance Academy
- Style: Kathak
- Awards: Sangeet Natak Akademi Award (see all)

Rohini Bhate (14 November 1924 – 10 October 2008) was among the senior most Kathak dance exponents in India, who developed this Indian classical dance as a performer, teacher, writer, researcher and critic. She was the recipient of several recognitions, such as the Sangeet Natak Akademi Award, and the Kalidas Samman.

Rohini studied Kathak from Jaipur and Lucknow gharanas. She created a large corpus of dance compositions, where she applied an analytical and innovative approach to abhinaya. Due to her knowledge in Hindustani classical music, she often composed the music for her dance creations. According to the critic Sunil Kothari, her choreography for Shakuntala, directed by Vijaya Mehta, is noteworthy. Her choreography of Kālidāsa's Ṛtusaṃhāra and Usba Sukta from Rigveda was also well acclaimed.

== Studies ==
Bhate was born in Patna, Bihar, to a middle-class Karhade Brahmin family. Bhate completed her school and college in Pune.

Bhate was initially trained in Bharatanatyam under Guru Parvati Kumar. She obtained her degree in arts of the Fergusson College in 1946. The same year she started learning Kathak with Sohanlal of Jaipur Gharana.

Shortly after, she specialised in Kathak under the guidance of Pandit Lachhu Maharaj, for more than twelve years, and of Pandit Mohanrao Kallianpurkar, from the Lucknow gharana, for more than fifteen years.

She also learnt Hindustani music from the musicians Keshavrao Bhole and Vasantrao Deshpande, and obtained a doctorate in Kathak.

== Career ==
Due to different circumstances of her learning, geographical, intellectual, temporary, among others, Rohini could experiment freely in Kathak, applying her musical and intellectual interests. Bhate founded the Nrityabharati Kathak Dance Academy at Pune in 1947. Over the last six decades she trained hundred of dancers from her academy. She popularized kathak dance among the middle-class families of Maharashtra.

In 1952, she visited China as a member of Indian cultural delegation. This travel was an opportunity to her to study old scriptures relating to Indian dances and drama, and thus refined her technique.

She served on the committee of Khairagarh University and guided the preparation of syllabi for Kathak courses at Lalit Kala Kendra, University of Pune, where she served as Visiting Lecturer and Guru. Rohini also served as an examiner for students in the Delhi Kathak Kendra, although she never adopted its curriculum.

Rohini Bhate authored several books in Marathi, including her autobiography, Majhi Nrityasadhana, a translation of the autobiography of Isadora Duncan, Mi Isadora, and an edited version of the Sanskrit manual of music and dance, Abhinaya Darpana, called Kathak Darpana Deepika. Rohini based several of her choreographies and creative projects in this ancient book. She also wrote numerous papers on Kathak.

In 2002, she participate as herself in a German documentary movie called Time and Space.

Regarding collaborations with other artists, Rohini known the Hindustani classical tabla player Chandrakant Kamat when he came to Pune in 1952. The musical association of both artists lasted for 15 long years. Rohini also made a comparative study of abhinaya in Kathak and Bharatanatyam with Kalanidhi Narayanan. She was a close friend of Reba Vidyarthi, another important Kathak exponent.

== Death ==
Bhate died on 10 October 2008 at the age of 83, in Pune, Maharashtra, India. According to her daughter-in-law and disciple Shama Bhate, Rohini Bhate had been suffering from Parkinson's disease for her last five years and died from complications arising from the ailment.

== Legacy ==
Rohini Bhate performed extensively for five decades, and trained a large number of disciples who became important exponents of Kathak, such as Shama Bhate, Neelima Adhye, Prabha Marathe, and Prerana Deshpande, among several others, who continued to perform posthumously events in her honor.

The academy has its head office in Pune's Shivaji Nagar, seven branches in the Pune city, one each in Indore, United States and Germany, and another in Mumbai.

Documentary films have been made on her work.

== Awards ==
- 1977: State government's Maharashtra Rajya Puraskar
- 1979: Sangeet Natak Akademi Award
- 1990: Maharashtra Gaurav Puraskar
- 2001: Kalidas Samman
- 2006: Sangeet Natak Akademi Fellowship
- 2007: Akademi Ratna award from the Sangeet Natak Akademi, New Delhi

== See also ==
- List of Kathak exponents
