= Roshan Kumari =

Indian classical dancer, actor and choreographer

- Born: 24 December 1937; Ambala, Haryana, India
- Died: 5th october 2026; Mumbai
- Occupations: Classical dancer Actor; Choreographer
- Known for: Kathak
- Parent: Zohrabai Ambalewali
- Awards: Padma Shri; Sangeet Natak Akademi Award; Nritya Shiromani; Nritya Vilas; Vishwa Unnyyan Samsad; Maharashtra Gaurav Puraskar; Kathak Kendra Man Patra; All India Bhuwalka Award; Hanumant Award; Hafiz Ali Khan Award Latest

Roshan Kumari Fakir Mohammad is an Indian classical dancer, actor and choreographer, considered by many as one of the foremost exponents of the Indian classical dance form of Kathak. She follows the Jaipur Gharana and is the founder of Nritya Kala Kendra, Mumbai, an academy promoting Kathak. A recipient of the Sangeet Natak Akademi Award in 1975, she received the fourth highest Indian civilian honour of Padma Shri from the Government of India in 1984.

== Biography ==
Roshan Kumari was born on Christmas Eve (year of birth uncertain) at Ambala in the north Indian state of Haryana (erstwhile Punjab) to Choudhury Fakir Mohammed, a noted Tabla player and Zohrabai Ambalewali, renowned classical and playback singer. She learnt the basics of Kathak from K. S. Moray and continued her studies at Maharaj Bindaddin School of Kathak, Mumbai under Sunder Prasad ji and learnt the jaipur gharana. Later, she also trained under Ghulam Hussain Khan and Hanuman Prasad and learnt Bharat Natyam from Govindraj Pillai and Mahalingam Pilai.

Roshan Kumari has performed in many places in India including a special performance at the Rashtrapathi Bhavan. She has also performed in front of personalities such as Jawaharlal Nehru, Indira Gandhi, Nikita Khrushchev, Milton Obote, Hussein of Jordan and the King of Nepal. In 1971, she founded the Nritya Kala Kendra, at Bandra in Mumbai, where she tutors several students. Mukta Joshi, Aditi Bhagwat, Nandita Puri, Nigaar Bano, Shelina Virani, Sehajpreet Singh, Himani, Sangeeta, Anonna Guha and Shailla Aurora are some of her notable students. Roshan Kumari Ji, who remains unmarried, lives in Mumbai.

== Film career ==
In 1953, Bimal Roy invited Kumari to perform a Kathak number in his film, Parineeta. The next year, she performed in Waris of Nitin Bose and a Hindi / Urdu bilingual, Mirza Ghalib, directed by Sohrab Modi. Her next appearance was in Basant Bahar, a 1956 film by Raja Nawathe. Satyajit Ray, the renowned Indian filmmaker used a dance sequence performed by her in his 1958 film, Jalsaghar. In 1970, Films Division of the Government of India released a documentary on the history and practice of Kathak, which features performances by notable Kathak exponents like Damayanti Joshi, Uma Sharma, Sudarshan Dheer and Shambhu Maharaj, besides Roshan Kumari. Later she also worked as a choreographer in Hindi feature films such as Gopi, Lekin... (1990), Chaitali (1975) and Sardari Begum (1996).

== Awards and honours ==
Kumari received the Nritya Shiromani title from the Prayag Sangeet Samiti at the Twelfth All India Music Conference of 1963 and the Sangeet Natak Akademi Award in 1976. A year later, Sur Singer Samsad awarded her the Nritya Vilas honour. The Government of India honoured her with the civilian award of Padma Shri in 1984 and the Government of Bengal awarded her the Vishwa Unnyyan Samsad in 1989. She received the Maharashtra Gaurav Puraskar from the Government of Maharashtra in 1990 and the Man Patra honour from Kathak Kendra, Jaipur in 1993. Kumari, an Emeritus fellow of the Government of India, is also a recipient of the All India Bhuwalka Award (2005) and the Hanumant Award (2008).

== Filmography ==
- Parineeta (1953) - actor
- Waris (1954) - actor
- Mirza Ghalib (1954) - actor
- Basant Bahar (1956) - actor
- Jalsaghar (1958) - actor
- Gopi (1970) - choreographer
- Lekin... (1990) - choreographer
- Chaitali (1975) - choreographer
- Sardari Begum (1996) - choreographer

== See also ==
- Zohrabai Ambalewali
- Jalsaghar
- Parineeta (1953 film)
- Basant Bahar (film)
