= Manisha Gulyani =

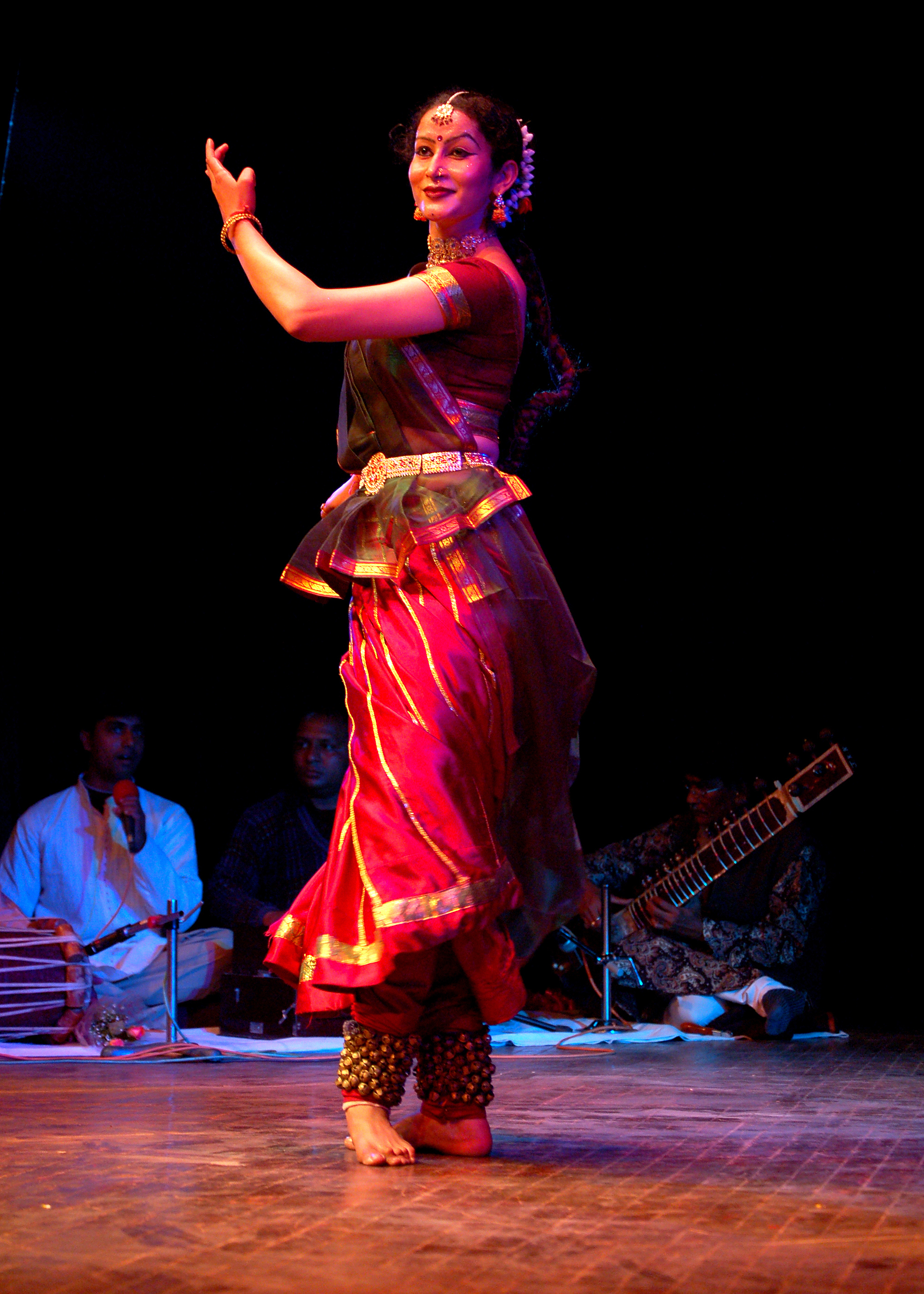

Background information
- Born: Jaipur, Rajasthan
- Origin: India
- Genres: Indian classical dance
- Occupation: Performing Artiste
- Website: Official website

Manisha Gulyani (Hindi: मनीषा गुलयानी) is a Kathak dancer from India. She is a disciple of Pt. Girdhari Maharaj and has been taking advanced training under the able guidance of Guru Prerana Shrimali. An ICCR Kathak artiste and teacher cum performer for ICC centres at abroad. She has presented her art on various eminent platforms in India and abroad.

== Early life ==
Manisha was born and brought up in Jaipur, India. She started her training at Jaipur Kathak Kendra at a young age of seven.

== Career ==
She has presented research articles in the field of Indian classical music & dance and chaired the performing arts department as HoD at Amity University Jaipur. Her Kathak recitals include platforms both nationally as well as internationally namely Bali Spirit Festival, Silk Roads Project Venice, Nanning International Festival China, Trufesta International Dance Festival Nigeria, Culturall Europe, OMI & High Point University USA and Kathak & Music festivals in India. She is one of the founder executive member for Delphic Council of Rajasthan. She is the curator of annually organised Indian Classical Dance festival Thirak Utsav.

== Personal life ==
Manisha is married to Hindi fiction writer Lokesh Gulyani.
