= Shila Mehta =

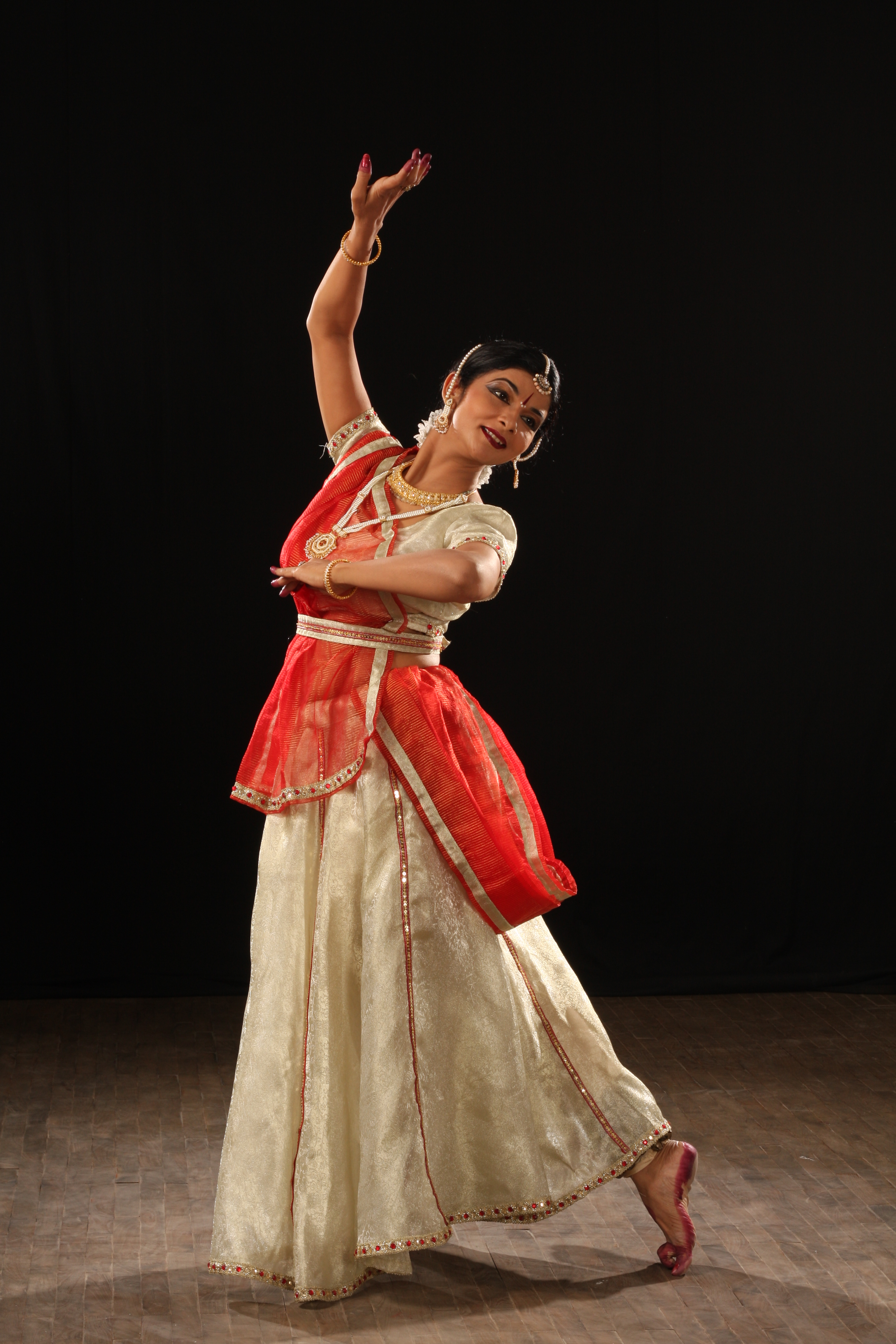
- Shila Mehta performing Kathak
- Born: Kolkata, India
- Occupations: Dance artist, choreographer, teacher, composer
- Dancing career
- Dances: Kathak
- Website: www.shilamehtakathak.in

Shila Mehta is an Indian Classical dance artist, choreographer, teacher, and composer. Her background is firmly rooted in the North Indian form of Kathak, which she has taken to audiences across the globe including touring India, North America, Australia and Europe. Mehta is the founder of Nupur Zankar Academy of Performing Arts and Research Centre in Mumbai India, The institute is registered with the Indian Council for Cultural Relations in New Delhi.

== Early life and training ==
Shila was born in Kolkata (1 January), from where she attained a Bachelor of Commerce from Calcutta University, and a Master of Fine Arts from Kavi Kulguru Kalidas Sanskrit University, Maharashtra India. She acquired the title "Nritya Praveen" from the Prayag Sangeet Samithi in Allahabad, India. She has also undertaken an extensive range of professional development through York University, Toronto, Canada including exploring contemporary dance, dance therapy and site-specific dance. Mehta started dancing at the age of five under Nrityacharya Shri Prahlad Das. From the age of sixteen onwards she also spent a considerable amount to time training with Pandit Chitresh Das, Pandit Vijay Shankar and Pandit Birju Maharaj, in addition to exposure to other eminent exponents such as Kumudini Lakhia. Her lay and taal training was under Taalyogi Pandit Suresh Talwalkar.
