= Damayanti Joshi =

Indian dancer (1928–2004)

- Born: 5 September 1928; Bombay, Bombay Presidency, British India
- Died: 19 September 2004 (aged 76); Mumbai, Maharashtra, India
- Occupations: dancer, choreographer, dance instructor
- Awards: Padma Shri; Sangeet Natak Akademi Award
- Dancing career
- Dances: Kathak

Damayanti Joshi (5 September 1928 – 19 September 2004) was an Indian dancer who was a noted renowned exponent of the Kathak dance form. She believed Kathak is the art of storytelling. She began in the 1930s dancing in Madame Menaka's troupe, which travelled to many parts of the world. She learnt Kathak from Sitaram Prasad of Jaipur Gharana and became an adept dancer at a very young age, and later trained under from Acchan Maharaj, Lacchu Maharaj and Shambhu Maharaj of Lucknow gharana, thus imbibing nuances from both the traditions. She became independent in the 1950s and achieved prominence in the 1960s, before turning into a guru at her dance school in Mumbai.

She received the Padma Shri in 1970, the Sangeet Natak Akademi Award for Dance in 1968, and had remained Director of the U.P. Kathak Kendra in Lucknow.

== Early life and training ==
Born in a Hindu family in Mumbai in 1928, she grew up in the household of General Dr Sahib Singh Sokhey and his wife Leila Sokhey (born Roy) who became known as Madame Menaka. Manaka had lost her own child and she had decided to adopt Joshi. Joshi's mother Vatsala Joshi would not give up her daughter and they agreed to be joint guardians. Initially performed in temples.In Manaka's troupe she learnt about Kathak from Pandit Sitaram Prasad as she toured in Menaka's troupe. After ten years, when she was 15 she had performed in European major cities. The Sokheys employed Damayanti's mother and Joshi received an education. Among her contemporaries at Madame Menaka's was Shirin Vajifdar, a pioneering classical dancer from the Parsi community.

She was the first student at Mumbai's Sri Rajarajeswari Bharata Natya Kala Mandir, where she learned Bharat Natyam from Guru T. K. Mahalingam Pillai, doyen among nattuvanars.

== Career ==
After the mid-1950s, Damayanti established herself as a successful solo Kathak dancer, taking training from Pandits, Achhan Maharaj, Lachhu Maharaj and Shambhu Maharaj of the Lucknow gharana and Guru Hiralal of the Jaipur gharana. Particularly, at Kathak Kendra, Delhi, she trained under Shambhu Maharaj. She was the first person to introduce "Saree" as a costume in Kathak dance.

She also taught Kathak at Indira Kala Vishvaidyalaya, Khairagarh, and Kathak Kendra in Lucknow. She has been honoured with the Sangeet Natak Akademi Award (1968) and the Padma Shri (1970). She was also the guru to Bireshwar Gautam.

She has been featured in the documentary on Kathak in 1971 by Films Division, Government of India, and another film entitled "Damayanti Joshi" directed by Hukumat Sarin was made in 1973.

Damayanti Joshi died in Mumbai at her home on Sunday, 19 September 2004. She had been ailing and was bed-ridden for almost one year after she suffered a stroke.

== Works ==
- Madame Menaka, by Damayanti Joshi. Sangeet Natak Akademi, 1989.
- Rediscovering India, Indian philosophy library: Kathak dance through ages, by Projesh Banerji, Damayanti Joshi. Cosmo publications, 1990.

== See also ==
- List of Kathak dancers
