= Sushmita Banerjee (dancer) =

Indian dancer

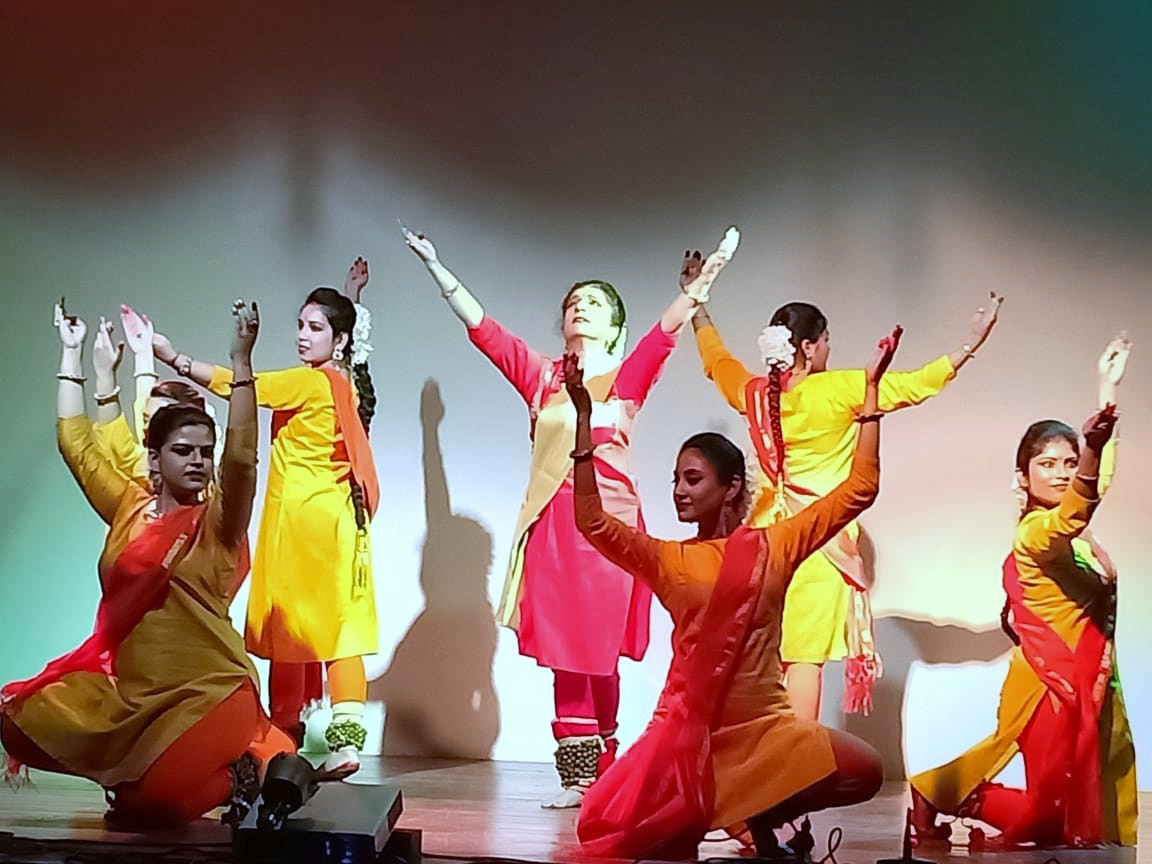
- Sushmita Banerjee performing with her students
- Education: Loreto College in Kolkata.
- Occupation: Kathak exponent

Sushmita Banerjee is a Kathak exponent, choreographer and dance researcher from India. Sushmita has been under the guidance of Pandit Vijay Shankar and Smt. Maya Chatterjee briefly learned from Pandit Birju Maharaj.

She is a graded artiste of Doordarshan and is an empanelled artist of the Indian Council for Cultural Relations. Sushmita has revived the Katha Shaili of Kathak under the able guidance of Padma Vibhushan Pandit Birju Maharaj. She was featured in Swarthmore College professor Pallibi Chakrevorty's book, "Bells of Change" for her contribution to Kathak and Indian classical dance.

== Educational background ==
Sushmita graduated with a bachelor's degree in English literature from Loreto College in Kolkata. She also went on to receive her master's degree in English literature from Calcutta University.

== Performances ==
Sushmita has performed in major festivals all over India and the world. She was invited by UNESCO to present her choreographic works in Tokyo in 2007. She had visited Japan previously in 1992 - 1993 to present Kathak in its original richness and complex form. Sushmita has performed in other international cultural venues such as:

- Rietburg Museum, Zürich
- Ubersee Museum, Bremen
- Belgrade Television, Belgrade
- Vasanta Utsav, Erstwhile U.S.S.R
- Windows of the world, Beijing
- Festival of India, Bangkok
- Nehru Center, London
- I.C.C.R Tours, Muscat
- Ramayana Conference, Trinidad and Tobago
- U.C. Berkeley and UCLA, Berkeley and Los Angeles
- Kansas State University, Manhattan
- Ramayan Conference, Durban
- Bali Arts Festival, Bali

== Teaching ==
Sushmita Banerjee's gurukul in Kolkata welcomes students from different parts of the world such as U.S.A, Germany, Kuwait, Switzerland, Russia, Spain and Holland. Sushmita along with her students from Geneva's Ateliers d' Ethnomusicologie have staged several productions in Geneva and Kerala. Sushmita recently started The Kerala Gharana, a platform for learning, teaching and sharing of Indian dance and culture. Sushmita is also closely associated with cultural organisation, SPICMACAY. She conducts workshops around India in educational institutions like schools and universities. Her association with SPICMACAY has enabled her to work with gifted children from all around India.

== Awards and honours ==
Sushmita Banerjee has been honoured with

- Emeritus Fellowship - Ministry of Culture & Human Resources, Government of India
- One of the top 100 ICONIC Artists of 2021 by SCL Rhythm Research Centre.
- Best Choreography Award of 2021 by Nataraj International.
- Sringarmani Award - Sur Sringar Sansad, Mumbai
- Arya Natya Samaj - West Bengal
- Nritya Sadhana Puraskar - Akhil Bharatiya Sanskrutik Sangh, Pune
