= Shama Bhate =

Indian classical dancer

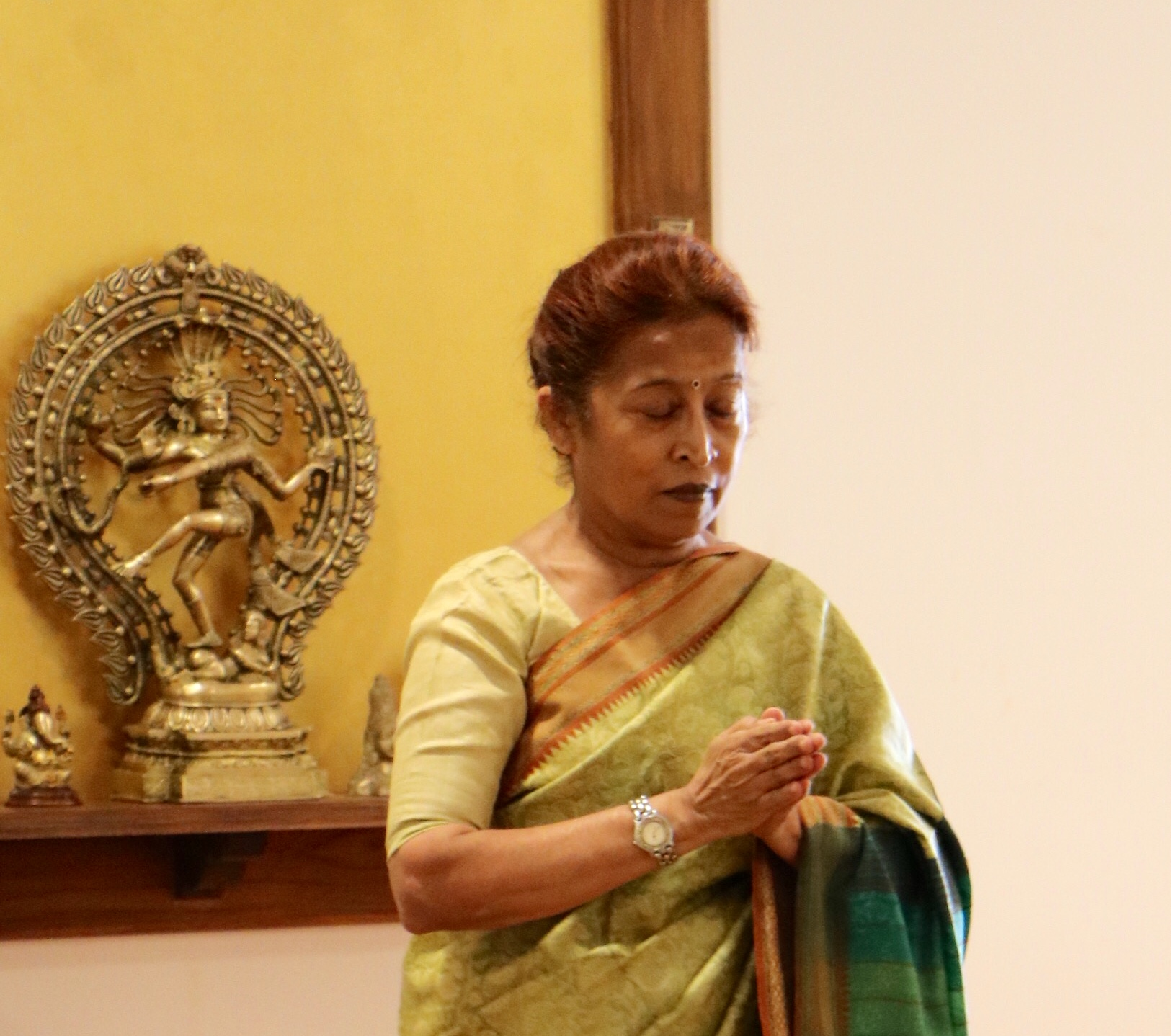
- Shama Bhate conducting a Kathak workshop in Bangalore
- Born: 6 October 1950 (age 75)
- Citizenship: Indian
- Occupation: Kathak dancer
- Partner: Sanat Bhate
- Children: Angat Bhate

Guru Shama Bhate (Marathi: शमा भाटे; born 6 October 1950), also known as Shama Tai, is an Indian Kathak dancer and choreographer. She has been active in the field of Kathak for more than four decades and began training in the dance form at the age of four. Bhate has trained numerous Kathak dancers in India and serves as the artistic director of Nadroop, a dance academy based in Pune.

== Personal life ==
Guru Shama Bhate was born in Belgaum (now Belagavi) on 6 October 1950 to Smt. Gulab Baisa Naik and Sri Ganagadhar G. Naik. She married Sanat Bhate in 1974, who is the son of Guru Rohini Bhatein. She has a son, Angad Bhate.

== Training ==
Shama Bhate is the disciple and daughter-in-law of the Guru Smt. Rohini Bhate. She also received training under Pt. Birju Maharaj and Pt. Mohanrao Kallianpurkar. Her idiom of Kathak dance incorporates insights into ‘Taal’ and ‘Laya’, developed under the guidance of the tabla maestro and exponent, Pt. Suresh Talwalkar.

As an educator, Shama Bhate has trained numerous professional Kathak Dancers and serves on several university boards. She is currently a senior guru at Pune University's Lalit Kala Kendra, Mumbai University's Nalanda College, Bharat College of Nagpur University, and Bharati Vidyapeeth in Pune.

Under her mentorship, more than thirty students have earned postgraduate degrees from various universities. Additionally, 12 of her students have been awarded the HRDC National scholarship for senior students, with others having received the CCERT scholarship for junior students.

== Choreographic work ==
Shama Bhate's choreographic work is extensive. She has experimented with both traditional and contemporary formats of Kathak. She has created a repertoire of traditional and classical compositions (Taals, taranas, thumris, etc.) with her own perspective. Some examples include Trishul (a blend of Taal cycles of 9, 10, and 11 beats), Samvaad (a Domuhi composition), and Layasopan (a traditional Kathak sequence presented through Panch Jatis). A more recent production from 2015 saw her drawing inspiration from the Indian epic Mahabharath and creating the "Ateet ki Parchaiyan—Reflections on the Mahabharath Saga" with dancers performing 7 different Indian classical and Indian folk dance forms. Another choreography that was performed by her students from Nadroop during the occasion of the 85th birthday celebration of the singer Lata Mangeshkar, was the dance ballet 'Chala Vahi Des'.

Some of her most recent productions in 2018 are:

1. Chaturang Ki Chaupal - this production introduces the four components of Chaturang: Sahitya, Sargam, Nach ke Bol, and Tarana in four Ragas woven together.
2. Echoes - Shama Tai's latest choreography is inspired by the Inner Voice and focuses on bhaav and abhinaya through the medium of five stories. Guru Shama Bhate also organizes and curates the Madame Menaka Choreography Movement, a proverb based choreography festival that happens on an annual basis in Pune.

== Awards and honours ==
- Maharashtra Rajya Puraskar – 2011, conferred by the Maharashtra State Government
- Kala Darpan Puraskar in 2012
- Kala Samvardhan Puraskar by Krishna Mulgur Smriti Pratishthan, 2012
- Kala Gaurav Puraskar by Kalanidhi, 2013
- Rohini Bhate Puraskar by the Pune Municipal Corporation, 2018
- Y.U.V.A Puraskar on International Women's Day, 2018, for her invaluable contribution to Kathak
- Nehru Yuva Kendra Puraskar – Krida mantralaya, 2018
- Shri Kundanlal Gangani Award, 2019

== See also ==
- List of Kathak dancers
