= Vidyagauri Adkar =

Indian dancer

- Born: Mumbai, Maharashtra, India
- Citizenship: Indian
- Education: Indian classical dance, Hindustani classical music
- Occupation: Classical Dancer
- Style: Kathak

Vidyagauri Adkar is a Kathak dancer in India representing the Jaipur Gharana. She has performed at several music festivals including Khajuraho Festival of Dances, Chilanka Dance Festival in Thiruvananthapuram, and the Festival of Dance and Music, Delhi.

== Career ==
Adkar started her dance training initially in Borivali, Mumbai, and Pune during her school and college education. She moved to Delhi for higher education. She has performed in many parts of India and South Africa.

== Music festivals ==
- Khajuraho Festival of Dances, Khajuraho
- Kathak Prabha – Festival of India in South Africa
- 2012 Kathak Mahotsava, Delhi
- World Dance Day celebration, New Delhi

== See also ==
- List of Kathak exponents
- List of Kathak dancers
