= Véronique Azan =

French dancer

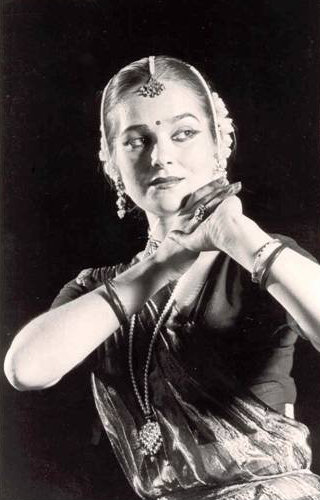
- Azan performing in Delhi
- Born: Véronique Marie Azan; Neuilly-Sur-Seine, Paris, France
- Known for: Performing art

Véronique Azan was a French Kathak dancer known for beauty and grace. During her active years of dance, she traveled the world performing in various dance festivals.

== Early life and background ==
Azan was born in France. She first arrived in India when she was 7 years old. After attending a concert of Ravi Shankar, her parents decided to move to India to learn how to play sitar and tabla. Her father played tabla under Kishan Maharaj and her mother's sitar guru was Amanth Mishra in Varanasi and Narendra Baraju in Nepal. They settled in Varanasi, a city considered to be the cultural center of North India. Azan was especially fascinated by the music of the ghungroos. She was initiated in Kathak by Sitara Devi's sister Shrimati Alaknanda Devi. She later moved to Delhi where she joined the Kathak Kendra and became a student of Pandit Birju Maharaj. She died in Bali on 2 August 2017.

== Career ==
Azan gave recitals in national and international events including the Khajuraho Dance Festival and the Festivals of India in France (1985), USSR (1987), and Japan (1988).

She was featured in several dance-dramas choreographed by Birju Maharaj and traveled with his troupe in India and Europe. In 1995 she was invited to perform in the Avignon Festival in France. She gave many performances in Mexico where she spent 10 years of her life.
