= Sunayana Hazarilal =

Indian classical dancer

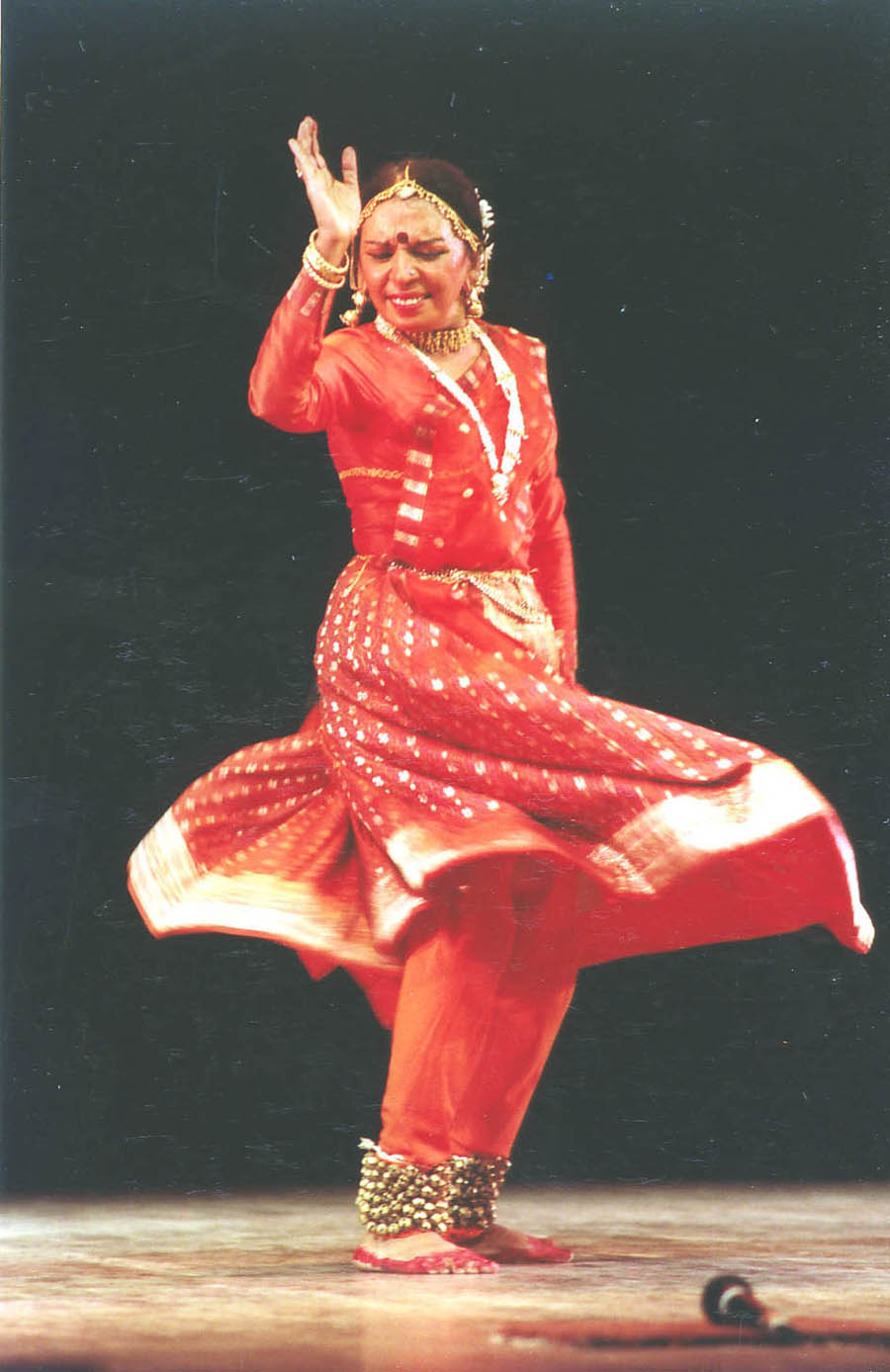
- In 2004
- Born: Mumbai, Maharashtra, India
- Occupation: Kathak dancer
- Awards: Padma Shri; Sangeet Natak Akademi Award; Abhinayan Kala Saraswati; Maharashtra Gaurav Award
- Website: www.natwari.org

Sunayana Hazarilal Agarwal is an Indian classical dancer, known for her expertise in the classical dance form of Kathak and reportedly the only surviving practitioner of the Janakiprasad Gharana of Kathak, also known as Banares Gharana. The Government of India honored her in 2011, with the fourth highest civilian award of Padma Shri.

== Biography ==
Sunayana Hazarilal, née Sunayana Agarwal, was born in Mumbai to a Railway officer and started learning classical dance from an early age. Refusing to move out of Mumbai to learn Kathak when her father was transferred elsewhere, she practised under the tutelage of Guru Hazarilal who was a known exponent of the Benaras Jankiprasad Gharana.

Sunayana is the Director of Natawari Dance Academy and heads the Kathak division of the Sangeet and Nartan Shiksha Peeth of the Bharatiya Vidya Bhavan, Mumbai. She is also a visiting faculty at many other institutions. She has conducted dance workshops in New York, San Francisco and Raleigh in the USA and has toured many countries such as Italy, Germany and Belgium. She has also been a visiting faculty at the University of California, Los Angeles (UCLA) in 1990.

Sunayana Hazarilal has done research on the genealogy of Janakiprasad Gharana and has published many articles on the topic. A recipient of such awards as the Sangeet Natak Akademi Award (2003), Abhinayan Kala Saraswati from Bala Subramanya Sabha and the Maharashtra Gaurav Award, Sunayana was honored by the Government of India when she was included in the Republic Day Honors in 2011.

== See also ==
- Kathak
- List of Kathak exponents
