= Rani Karnaa =

Indian classical dancer

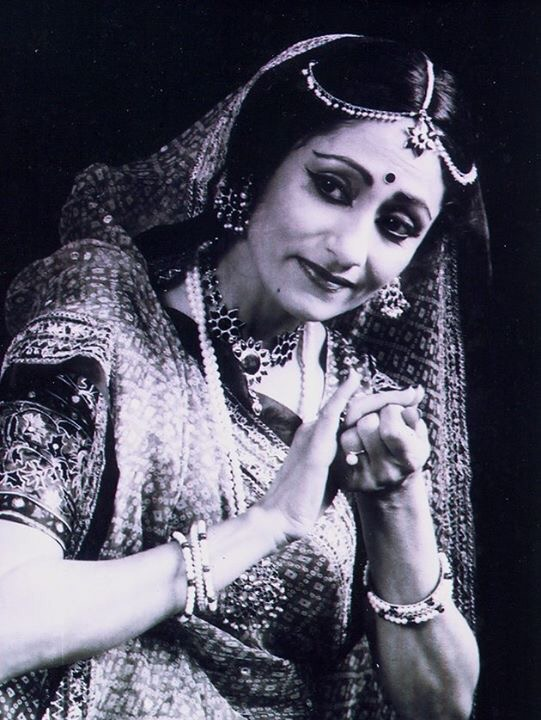
- Born: 1939; Hyderabad, Sindh, British India
- Died: 7 May 2018 (aged 78–79); Kolkata
- Occupation: Kathak dancer
- Spouse: Nayak
- Parent: Assandas Karnaa
- Awards: Padma Shri; Vice-President's Gold Medal; Order of the Queen of Laos; Sangeet Natak Akademi Award; Sangeet Varidhi; Vijay Ratna; Senior Fellowship - Govt of India

Rani Karnaa was an Indian classical dancer, known for her proficiency in the Indian dance form of Kathak, and regarded by many as one of the greatest exponents of the art form. She was honoured by the Government of India, in 2014, by bestowing on her the Padma Shri, the fourth highest civilian award, for her services to the field of dance.

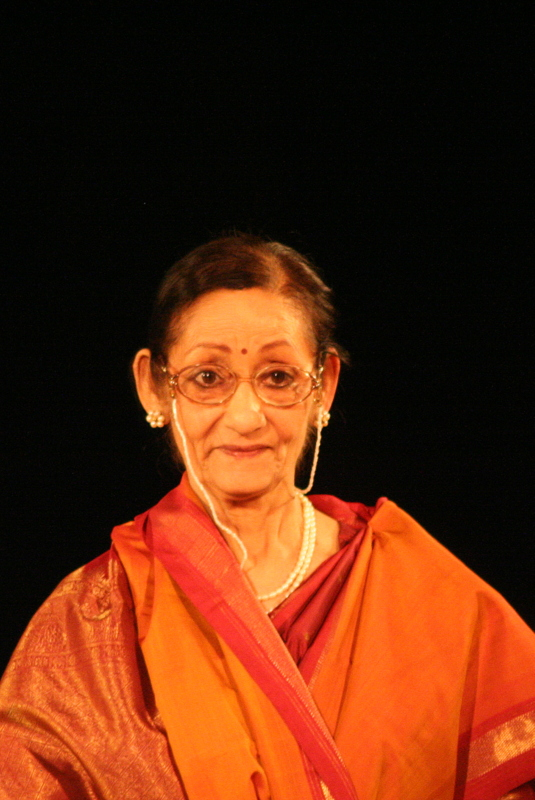
Portrait of Rani Karnaa

== Biography ==
Rani polished her Kathak into an instrument of elegance and grace in which she has few equals., Late Dr. Charles Fabri, art crtitic, wrote about Rani Karnaa in the Statesman.

Rani Karnaa was born in 1939, in a Sindhi family of amirs in Hyderabad, in the present day Pakistan and erstwhile British India. Her father, Assandas Karnaa belonged originally to the Karnamalani family of Larkana region. The family name of Karnamalani, over a period of time, got abbreviated to Karanani and eventually to Karnaa. In 1942, her family moved to Delhi when the young Rani was three years old. She had her early schooling in Delhi and graduated in Botany from the Hindu College, Delhi. She also did Honours degree in Botany later but forsook academics to concentrate on her dance career.

Rani Karnaa's family moved from Sindh to Delhi when she was three and settled at Connaught Place. She soon grew a fancy for dance seeing a neighbor dancing, insisted on learning the art and started learning dance from the age of four, learning Kathak, Odissi, Bharatanatyam and Manipuri. Her early teachers were Nrityacharya Narayan Prasad and Sundar Prasad. She continued her studies to master the Jaipur gharana style under Guru Hiralal and the Lucknow gharana ethos from Pandit Birju Maharaj.

Rani Karnaa shifted her residence to Bhubaneshwar when she got married into an Odia family in 1963 and this gave her an opportunity to meet Kumkum Mohanty, the famous Odissi dancer. Through her, Rani Karnaa got in touch with the renowned guru, Kelucharan Mahapatra and learnt Odissi from the master from 1966 to 1985. She has also trained under various other famous gurus such as Amubi Singh, Narendra Kumar and Lalita Shastri, a disciple of the renowned Rukmini Devi Arundale.

Rani Karnaa performed extensively across India and outside, performing at almost all the major classical dance festivals in India. Her performances are said to have received acclaim in places like UK, Russia and many other European countries.

Rani Karnaa lived in Kolkata, since shifting from Bhubaneshwar when her husband, Nayak, was transferred to Kolkata in 1978, attending to her duties as the director of Samskritiki Shreyaskar and was active until recently, her last public performance was in 2013, at the age of 74. She died on 7 May 2018, aged 79.

== Legacy ==
Apart from contributing to the propagation of Kathak through her performances, Rani Karnaa is credited with integrating the traditions of Jaipur and Lucknow gharanas. Many critics have acknowledged her contributions in bringing different cultural traditions into Kathak, by integrating their literature, music and dance. She is said to have combined artistry with creative expression. She has done research on the aesthetics of Kathak with Professor S. K. Saxena of Delhi University and the body of that research work is well recognized.

She established a dance academy, Samskritiki Shreyaskar, 1995, and also guides the Sangeet and Nritya Sikshan Bharati, a division of Bharatiya Vidya Bhavan, Kolkata. She is also the founder and the first director of Calcutta School of Music and worked there from 1978 till 1993. She established the dance division of Aurobindo Bhavan, Kolkata, by name, Ahana and headed the department from 1980 to 1987.

== Samskritiki Shreyaskar ==
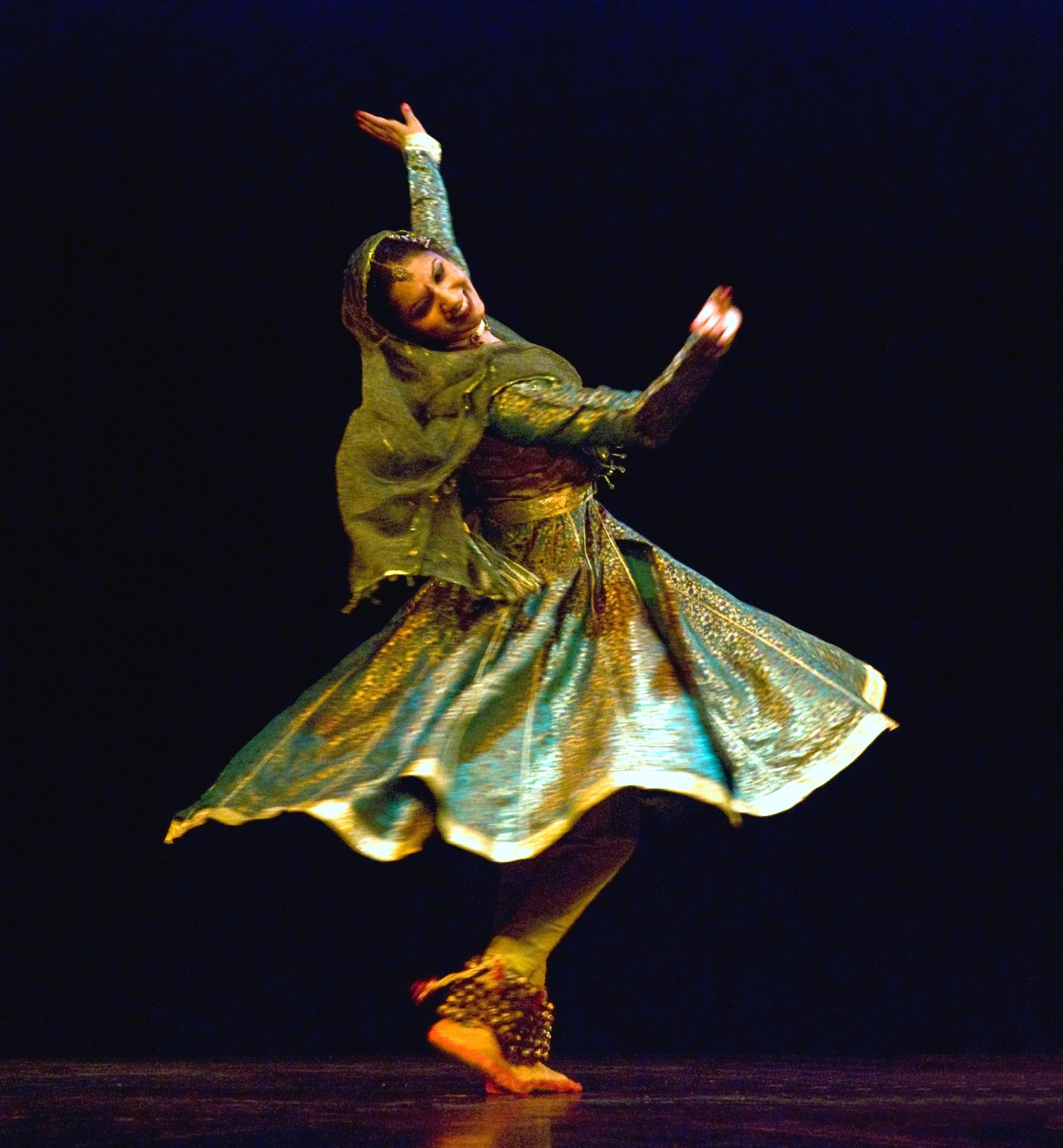
A Kathak dancer performing the chakkarwala tukra, one of the many popular highlights of Kathak

Samskritiki Shreyaskar is a dance academy founded in 1995, by Rani Karnaa, with the aim to propagate the dance form of Kathak and to develop the performing arts in general. The academy stands along Jodhpur Park, Kolkata and offers various courses in various dance forms. The academy and its students have participated in various cultural festivals across India such as:

- Konarak Festival - 1994
- Jaipur Kathak Festival, New Delhi - 1995
- Rabindra Janmotsav, Calcutta - 1996, 1998 and 1999
- Vasantotsav, New Delhi - 2000
- Natyanjali Festival, Chidambaram - 2000
- Puri Beach Festival - 2000
- Kathak Mahotsav, Calcutta - 2000
- Thyagaraja Festival, Tirupati - 2000
- Virasat Festival, Mangalore - 2000.

The academy, apart from the courses it offers, conducts workshops and live demonstrations. It has associations with Rabindra Bharati University and Nehru Children's Museum, New Delhi, for conducting regular workshops. It also has a subsidiary centre in Odisha, started in 2005.

== Awards and recognitions ==
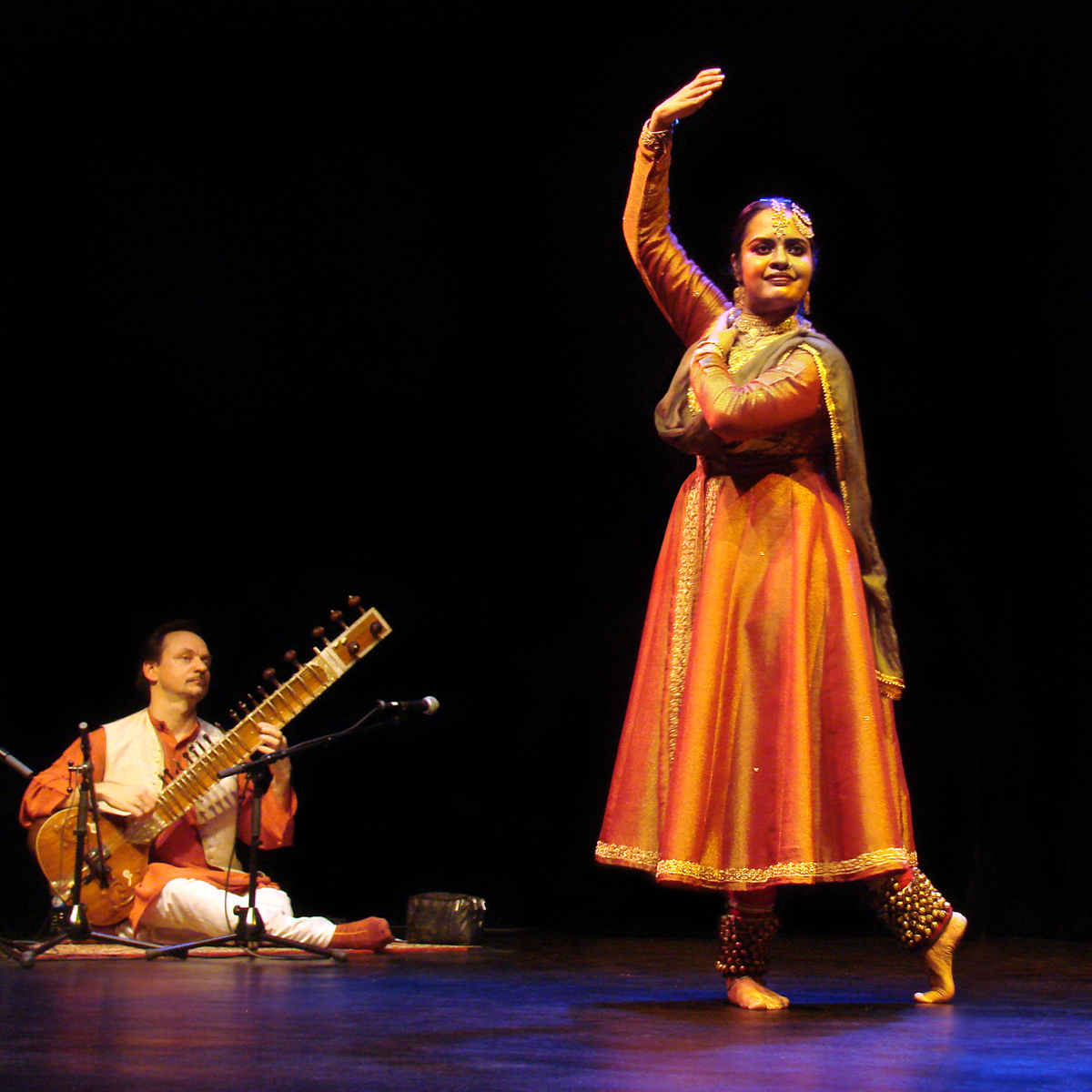
Music to Kathak is normally provided by tabla and sitar players

Rani Karnaa was honoured by the Government of India by awarding her the Padma Shri, in 2014, in recognition of her efforts to the cause of Kathak dance. She has also received many other awards and honours such as:

- Vice-President's Gold Medal - Shankar's Weekly - 1954
- Order of the Queen of Laos - 1964
- Sangeet Varidhi - Bharatiya Kala Kendra, New Delhi - 1977
- Vijay Ratna - Indian International Friendship Society, New Delhi - 1990
- Senior Fellow - Department of Culture, Ministry of Human Resources Development - Government of India
- Sangeet Natak Akademi Award - 1996
- Honorary Award - Akhil Bhartiya Sindhi Boli and Sahitya Sabha - 1998

== See also ==
- Pandit Birju Maharaj
- Kumkum Mohanty
