= Uma Sharma =

Indian dancer

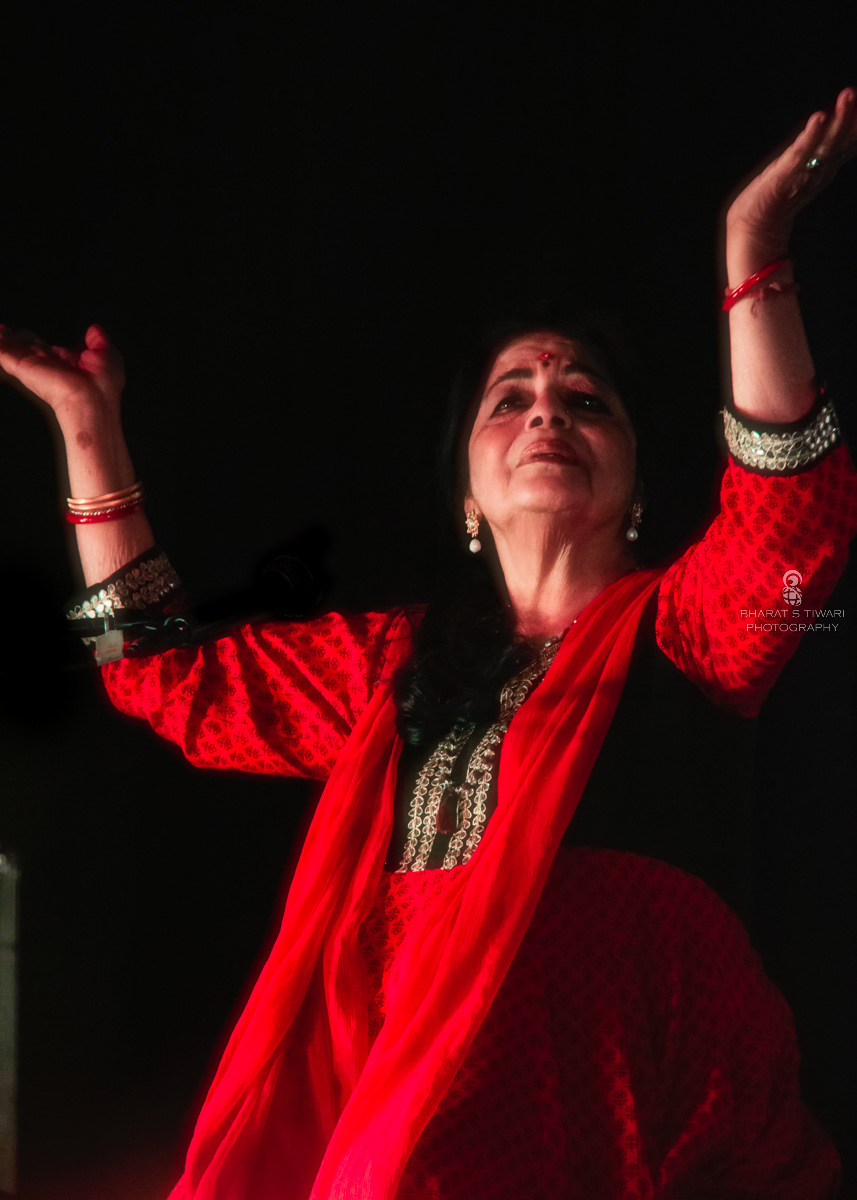
- Born: 1942 (age 83–84); Dholpur
- Occupations: Classical Dancer, choreographer, teacher

Uma Sharma (born 1942) is a kathak dancer, choreographer and teacher. She also runs the Bharatiya Sangeet Sadan, a classical dance and music academy, situated in New Delhi, founded by her father in 1946. She is most known for reviving the old classical dance form of Natwari Nritya or the Raslila of Brindavan, which later evolved into the Kathak.

Kathak is based on devotional Krishna poetry of the medieval centuries and the highly cultivated court poetry of the 18th and 19th centuries which celebrated shringara, the sentiment of love.

== Early life and training ==
Uma Sharma's family hails from Dholpur in Rajasthan. Born in Delhi in 1942, Uma Sharma received her dance training from Guru Hiralalji and Girvar Dayal of the Jaipur gharana, and subsequently she became a student of Pandit Sunder Prasad of the Jaipur gharana who emphasised rhythmic footwork and its permutations. Shambhu Maharaj and Birju Maharaj noted gurus of the Kathak tradition of the Lucknow gharana, known for the art of abhinaya, subsequently Uma Sharma sought to achieve a creative fusion of the two. Uma went to St. Thomas' School (New Delhi) for schooling, and then graduated from Lady Shri Ram College for Women, also in New Delhi.

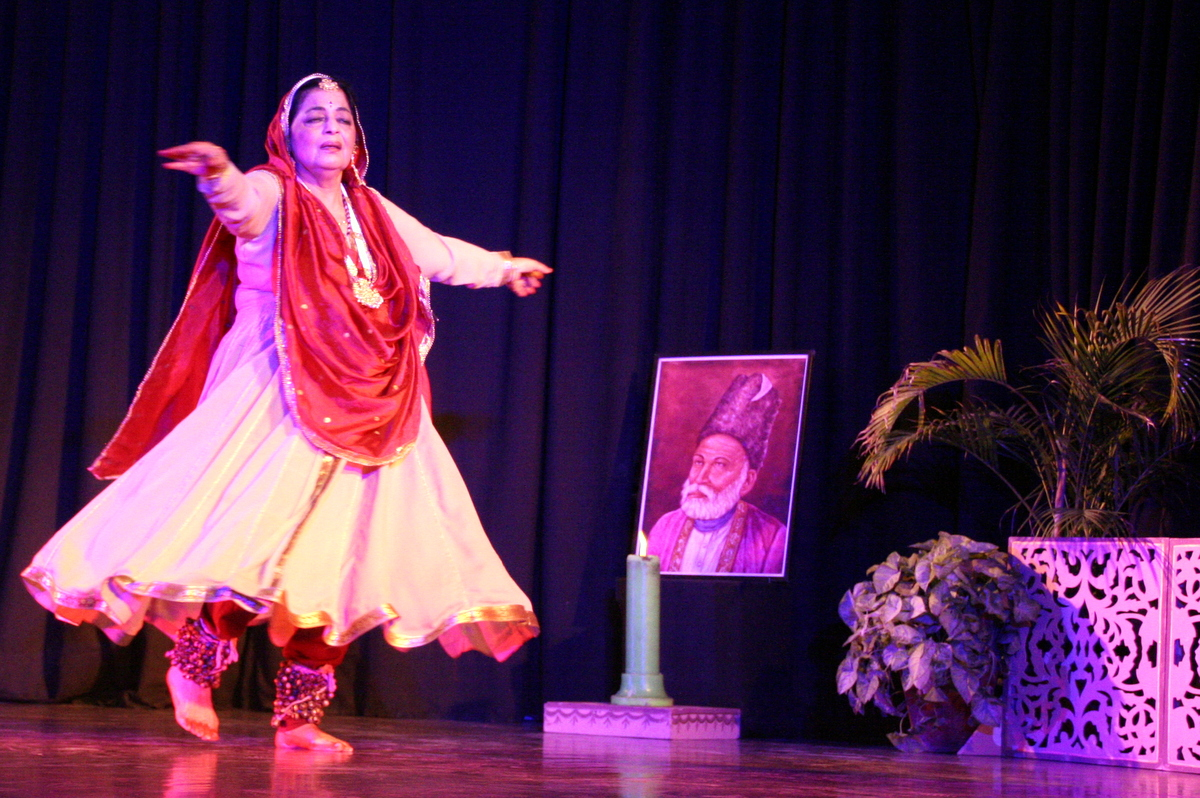
Uma Sharma Performing on Eve of Mirza Ghalib Anniversary

== Career ==
After studying and performing traditional Kathak repertoire, she expanded her work by creating new dance compositions and full-length dance dramas based on a range of themes. Her dance drama Stree (Woman) explores the representation of women’s experiences and identity across different historical periods through a solo Kathak performance format.

Uma has performed all over the country and participated in many a national and international festivals. She has been on performance tours to USSR, New Zealand, Australia, USA, Canada, Middle East, Japan and China, both on invitation from organizations abroad and as a representative of the Department of Culture and the Indian Council for Cultural Relations.

Uma Sharma runs her own School of Music and Dance in the capital and has trained a new generation of younger dancers.

However, veteran dance critic and scholar Sunil Kothari of New Delhi, has criticized her dance as always being very Bollywood oriented in nature. He has also accused her of misusing her connections with various government officials to gain awards and publicity. Uma hasn't commented on such allegations.

== Awards ==
In 1973 she became the youngest dancer be conferred upon with the Padma Shri by Government of India, and Padma Bhushan 2001. She was awarded the Sangeet Natak Akademi Award and also the Sahitya Kala Parishad Award. On 27 January 2013, she was honoured with title Srijan Manishi by Akhil Bhartiya Vikram Parishad, Kashi for her great contribution to Indian Kathak Dance.
