= Jitendra Maharaj =

Indian dancer

- Born: 9 September 1934; Bareilly, United Provinces, British India
- Died: 18 February 2023 (aged 88); Delhi, India
- Occupations: Kathak dancer, choreographer, teacher
- Organization: Sangeetika Institute of Performing Arts (1970)
- Known for: Benaras gharana of Kathak
- Awards: Sangeet Natak Akademi Award (2016)

Jitendra Maharaj (9 September 1934 – 18 February 2023) was an Indian Kathak dancer, choreographer, percussionist and teacher associated with the Benaras gharana of Kathak , and specialising in the temple traditions of Katha. He founded the Sangeetika Institute of Performing Arts in New Delhi in 1970 and in a career spanning across nearly six decades trained numerous dancers, including the Kathak duo Kamalini and Nalini Asthana.

He was a recipient of Sangeet Natak Akademi Award in 2016, given by the Sangeet Natak Akademi, India's National Academy for Performing Arts. He has also written on the subject in various publications.

== Early life and training ==
Maharaj was born in Bareilly, Uttar Pradesh, into a landowning family. His father was Om Prakash Maharaj and his mother was Ramrakhi. He developed an interest in classical dance during his youth after watching a performance by Guru Krishna Kumar Maharaj in Bareilly. Subequently, he became his disciple.

== Career ==
Maharaj started his Kathak teaching career at Model Academy, Bareilly. He subsequently taught at Natwari Kendra, Varanasi, served as dance director at Manav Sthali School, New Delhi and also taught at Banasthali Vidyapith in Rajasthan. Finally in 1970, he started his Kathak dance school, Sangeetika Institute of Performing Arts in Delhi. Jitendra Maharaj is the guru of Kathak dancers Nalini and Kamalini.

== Personal life ==
Jitendra Maharaj died in Delhi on 18 February 2023, following brief illness. His disciples Nalini and Kamalini Asthana now run his organization.
