= Puru Dadheech =

Indian Kathak dancer

Mahamahopadhyaya Purushottam Dadheech
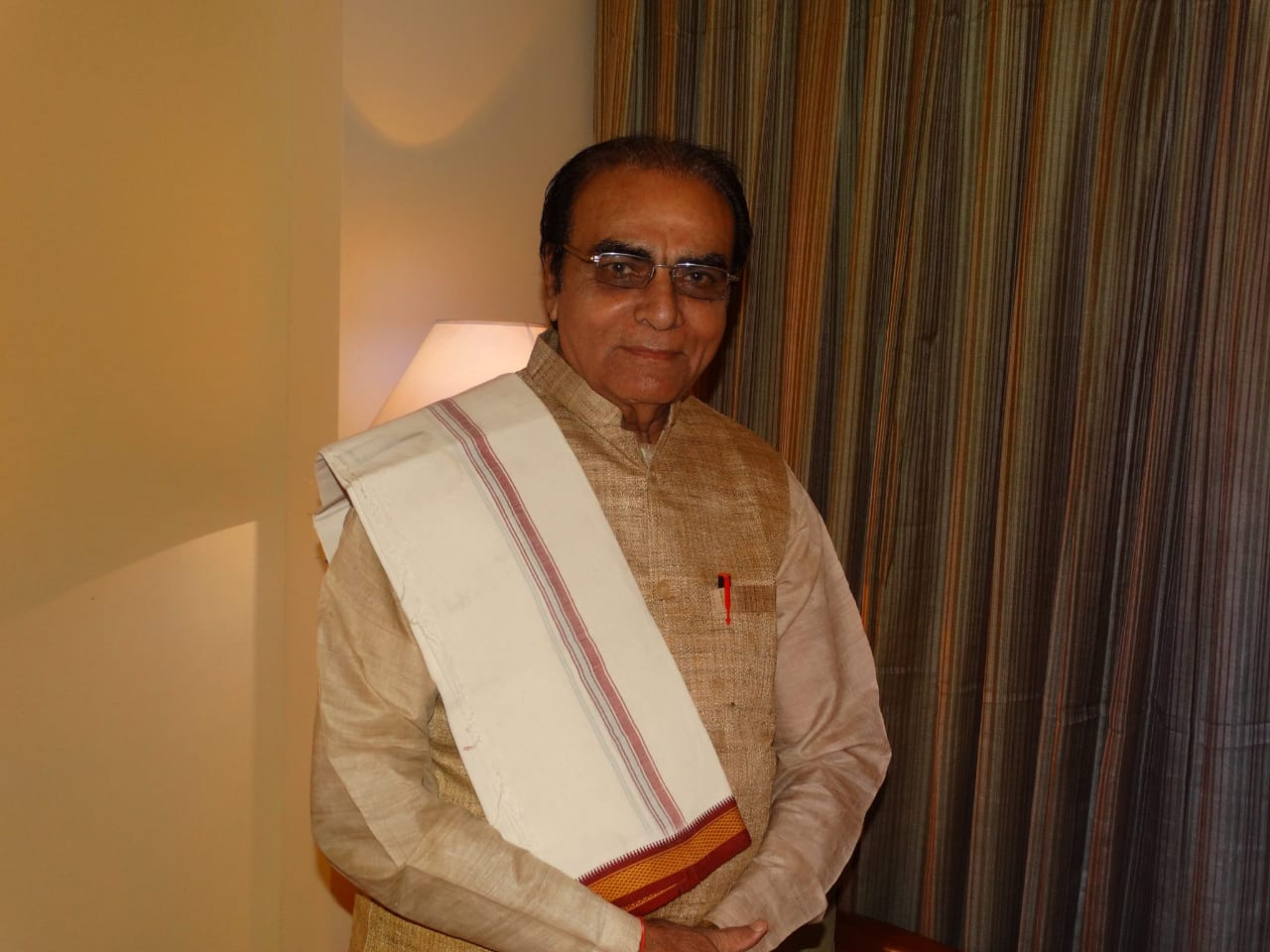
- Born: 17 July 1939 (age 87); Ujjain
- Occupations: Kathak Scholar, Dancer, Choreographer, Director - SSCARK, Ex-Professor Bhatkhande University, Ex-Dean Khairagarh University; Founder Natwari Kathak Nritya Academy, Indore
- Years active: 1954 - present
- Dancing career
- Dances: Kathak

Puru Dadheech (born Purushottam Dadheech, 17 July 1939) is a Kathak dancer, choreographer and an educator of Indian classical dance. At the oldest Kathak department which was formed in 1956 at Indira Kala Sangeet Vishwavidyalaya Public University located in Khairagarh. He is the holder of Doctorate in Kathak Classical Dance and emphasizes the relevance of Shastras (Indian Ancient Dance treatises like Natyashastra and Nandikeshvara's Abhinaya Darpana) in the Kathak repertoire. He was awarded Padma Shri, the 4th highest civilian award of India at the age of 81. He is currently serving as the Director of the dedicated Kathak research Centre at the Sri Sri University, Cuttack called Sri Sri Centre for Advanced Research in Kathak. He has received the Sangeet Natak Akademi Fellowship (Akademi Ratna). He has propounded the Dadheech Shaili Style of Kathak dance.

In 2025, he was awarded the Sangeet Natak Akademi Fellowship, the highest award of Sangeet Natak Akademi, India's National Academy for Performing arts.

== Education ==
Puru Dadheech studied under Guru-Shishya Parampara under Gurus Pt. Durga Prasad, Pt. Sunder Prasad as well as Pt. Narayan Prasad.

Dadheech is Doctorate (D.Mus.) in Kathak. Research dissertation Kathak Nritya ka Udbhav aur Vikas by Prayag Sangeet Samiti.

He received the Mahamahopadhyay and Sangeetacharya in Kathak from Akhil Bharatiya Gandharva Mahavidyalaya Mandal. He also has a PhD in Sanskrit Dramatics from Vikram University, Ujjain. His PhD was on the topic Sanskrit Prayog Vigyan Evam Kalidasiya Rupak which has been published as a book.

He has also received the Tagore National Fellowship by the Ministry of Culture.

== Personal life ==
Puru Dadheech was born to a traditional Pauranik brahmin family of Ujjain, Madhya Pradesh. He is married to kathak guru and researcher Dr. Vibha Dadheech. He has 2 sons and a daughter.

== Career ==
Puru Dadheech demonstrates Ghunghat in Kathak classical dance.

Dadheech had served as Professor and Head of the Dance Department at Bhatkhande University, Lucknow, and as Dean, Faculty of Arts, at Indira Kala Sangeet Vishwa Vidyalaya, Khairagarh, teaching and guiding several research scholars for their doctoral thesis.

Dadheech has been an editor for Swarn Jayanti Smarika Golden Jubilee Magazine of Bhatkhande Hindustani Sangeet Mahavidyala.

He participated in many seminars and delivered talks on subjects such as "Kalidasa and Natya Sashtra" at Birla Academy, Kolkata.

Puru Dadheech has developed Kathak syllabus books which are instated in the Kathak department of various universities. He has created the Dadheech style of Kathak.

He has been on committee on National Conference- "Innovation in Music And Dance"(23-24, Jan 2015) organized at Dept. Music And Dance, Govt. Maharani Laxmibai Girls P.G. college, Indore.

Dadheech has been a mentor and guide to several students doing Masters and Doctorate degrees in Kathak since 1961.

== Awards ==
- Sangeet Natak Akademi Fellowship (Akademi Ratna Sadsya) 2024-2025
- Padma Shri 2020
- Sangeet Natak Akademi Award 2018
- Kalidas Samman 2021
- Maha Mahopadhyay from Akhil Bharatiya Gandharva Mahavidyalaya Mandal
- Madhya Pradesh Govt, M.P., Shikhar Samman Award 2004
- Sangeet Natak Academy, U.P., Academy Award 1984

== Books ==
Dr. Dadheech has written many scholarly books which are also assigned as syllabus textbooks at Kathak departments of Universities. Some titles are:

- Kathak Nritya Shiksha Part 1 ISBN 978-81-931439-8-8
- Kathak Nritya Shiksha Part 2 ISBN 978-81-931439-5-7
- Kathak Dance Syllabi ISBN 978-81-931439-3-3
- Abhinaya Darpan ISBN 978-81-931439-7-1
- Sanskrit Prayog Vigyan Evam Kalidasiya Rupak ISBN 81-900056-3-4
- Nrittasutram ISBN 81-900056-4-2
- Natyashastra ka Sangeet Vivechan ISBN 81-900056-6-9
- Ashtottar Shattaal Lakshanam ISBN 81-901057-0-1
- Bharatnatyam Shiksha ISBN 978-81-931439-6-4
- Pashchyat Nrityakala ISBN 81-901057-5-2

== Rare compositions ==
Dr. Puru Dadheech has specially written and composed the Naayak Bheda – different types of heroes as well as conducted a workshop on rare compositions like 'Dashavatar' and 'Dhrupad' in 'Bhrama taal' (28 beats). His literary compositions are called 'Purukalp'.

== Dhrupad in Kathak ==
Dadheech's Dhrupad composition in 28 matra is sung regularly sung in concerts by 'Dhrupad' maestros the Gundecha Brothers.

In 1981, Dadheech choreographed and danced the ancient Nritya style of Dhrupad in Mathura. He has researched and written an article titled Dhrupad Nartan Ki Parampara.

In 2013 ITC Sangeet Research Academy has conducted Dhrupad Seminar in association with National Centre for the Performing Arts (India) (NCPA, Mumbai) where Puru Dadheech participated as speaker to discuss Origin of Dhrupad (Predecessors of Dhrupad) evolving into different Banis and PROPAGATION OF DHRUPAD - During the reign of Mansingh Tomar and others. Puru Dadheech, discussed the origin of Dhrupad at length and established that Dhrupads are older than the times of Raja Mansingh Tomar.

== 80th birthday celebrations ==
Dadheech's 80th birthday celebrations on 17 July 2019 started with a National Seminar on the topic ‘Contributions of Dr Puru Dadheech in the field of Dance, Literature and Shastras at Indore city. The chairperson for this seminar was Padma Shri Shovana Narayan. The Gundecha Brothers paid a tribute by singing three Dhrupad written by Puru Dadheech.
