= Shobha Koser =

Indian Kathak dancer

Shobha Koser is an Indian Kathak dancer, writer and teacher. Koser hails from the Jaipur Gharana. Koser is the recipient of the Sangeet Natak Akademi Award (2019) She taught various actors including Poonam Dhillon.

Dr. Shobha is a registrar of the organization named Pracheen Kala Kendra, the organization is founded by her late husband, Madan Lal Kosar who was a Tandav dancer in Chandigarh to promote classical music and dance.

== Early life ==
Shobha was the third child amongst her seven sibling born to a doctor father. Her mother was a student of science. Shobha trained under Guru Kanhiya Lal and she performed at Rashtrapati Bhavan before Rajendra Prasad when she was in class 8. She also trained later under Guru Kundan Lal Gangani. Shobha started performing on stages and studying classical dance when she was 15. She was married to M. L. Koser at the age of 17.

Shobha is a first-class first in Masters of Arts (MA) in dance from the Punjab University, Chandigarh. She had completed Nritya Alankar from the Akhil Bhartiya Gandharva Mahavidyalaya, Mandal (Mumbai), and Nritya Praveen from Prayag sangeet Samiti, Allahabad, Uttar Pradesh.

== Awards and titles ==
She has been entitled as Nritya Surabhi, Nritya Shree, Nritya Urvashi, Nritya Sharda, Abhinaya Samaragi, Shreekshetra Nati, etc.

Other Awards received by Shobha Kosar :-

- The Punjab Sangeet Natak Akademi Award,
- Amala Shankar Award,
- Pandit Manmohan Bhatt Memorial Award,
- The K. Lalitha Lifetime Achievement Award,
- Konark International Award,
- The Kala Shiromani Award by Madras Sangeet Natak Akademi,
- Award from All-India Critics Council of India (CCI),
- Lalit Arpan Samman.
