= Mohanrao Kallianpurkar =

- Born: Mohanrao Shankarrao Kallianpurkar; 12 August 1913; Bangalore, Kingdom of Mysore
- Died: 1 December 1985 (aged 72); Hubli, Karnataka
- Career
- Dances: Kathak

Mohanrao Shankarrao Kallianpurkar (pronounced [mɒhʌnrɑʊ kʌl'lɪɑːnpʊrkʌr]; 12 August 1913 – 1 December 1985) was a Kathak dancer and teacher from Karnataka, considered to be one of the greatest scholars and teacher of Kathak dance form. He belongs to Jaipur school of Kathak.

== Biography ==
Kallianpurkar was born on 12 August 1913 in Bangalore, Karnataka.

He was trained under Sunder Prasad, Achhan Maharaj, and Shambhu Maharaj. He helped Sunder Prasad to set up a Kathak dance academy in Mumbai in 1937. In 1939, he was appointed as a Kathak teacher at the Marris College of Music, later Bhatkhande Music Institute, in Lucknow, from where he retired in 1967. He choreographed and presented ballets such as Śakuntalā, Meghadoot, War and Peace, Vikramōrvaśīyam and Mālati Mādhav. His prominent pupils included Rohini Bhate.

He was married to Dr.Sudha Kallianpurkar from Dharwad and has two sons and a daughter.

He died on 1 December 1985 in Hubli, Karnataka.

== Awards ==
He received the Sangeet Natak Akademi Award in 1962, the Karnataka Sangeet-Nritya Akademi Award in 1971 and the Uttra Pradesh Sangeet Natak Akademi Award in 1981.
