= Sunder Prasad =

Pandit Sunder Prasad (died 29 May 1970) was a guru (teacher) of – Jaipur Gharana of the Indian classical dance form, Kathak. He received his training from his father Pandit Chunnilal of Jaipur Gharana. He also trained under Bindadin Maharaj of Lucknow Gharana. Sunder Prasad performed all over the country. Sunder Prasad was not just an artist, he is also a teacher. He taught Kathak Dance for almost 30 years in Mumbai and then shifted to Chennai. He was honoured by Natak Academy of Delhi in the year 1958.

== Family ==
Prasad is the son of Chunnilal and younger brother of Pandit Jailal Misra, doyen amongst the fraternity of Jaipur Gharana of Kathak. Ramgopal Misra and Jai Kumari are children of Jailal and trained under their father and uncle. Ramgopal's son Rajkumar Misra is a tabla player and teacher who settled in London. His daughter Kajal Misra is a Kathak performer and teacher. The youngest exponent of Jaipur Gharana of Kathak, carrying on the legacy are Saberi Misra and Trina Roy, daughters of Rajkumar and Kajal respectively.

== Career ==
In the 1930s Prasad established Maharaj Bindadin School of Kathak in Bombay (now Mumbai). After spending time training in Mumbai and Chennai, he settled in Delhi in 1958 and joined the Bharatiya Kala Kendra (later, Kathak Kendra) He was honoured by the Sangeet Natak Akademi in 1959 for his lifelong contribution to the Kathak Dance field.

During his career, Pt. Sunder Prasad has taught the nuances of Jaipur Gharana to many students, notable amongst them is Dr. Pandit Puru Dadheech Kathak scholar and Senior Kathak exponent.
