= Kamalini and Nalini Asthana =

Dance duo from Uttar Pradesh, India

Kamalini Asthana and Nalini Asthana are a sister duo from Agra in Uttar Pradesh known for their great performances of the Benaras Gharana style of Kathak. They are also known for their contributions to the popularisation of the Benaras Gharana style of Kathak both in India and abroad.

== Biography ==
Both Kamalini and Nalini were born in Agra, Uttar Pradesh. Their father, B P Asthana, was in the service of the Royal Air Force and their mother, Shyama Kumari Asthana was a Hindustani vocalist. Though they were born in Agra, they were brought up in Delhi. They had their education in Delhi Kannada Senior Secondary School run by the Mysore Government and in Sri Venkateswara College, University of Delhi.The first overseas trip of Kamalini and Nalini was in 1983 to attend the UFTAA Conference in Paris, France. Even though the tour was planned for only two weeks, they continued their tour and performances for nearly two years and a half. During this extended trip, the duo performed in Torremolinos and Madrid in Spain, in Dublin, Ireland and in the ISKCON in London. One of their important performances was for BBC's Eastern Eye hosted by Karan Thapar. They have also made a film titled "Voyage of Kathak" for The Inner London Education Authority (ILEA). They also gave lecture demonstrations in many educational institutions in London.

They have set a record by dancing at the height of 18,000-ft at Kailash Mansarovar and Badri Nath.

== Recognitions ==
- In the year 2022, Govt of India conferred the Padma Shri award, the third highest award in the Padma series of awards, on Kamalini Asthana and Nalini Asthana for their distinguished service in the field of art. The award is in recognition of his service as an "Acclaimed Kathak Dancer Duo from Agra known for teaching and propagating it globally".
