= Saswati Sen =

Indian Kathak dancer, choreographer and teacher

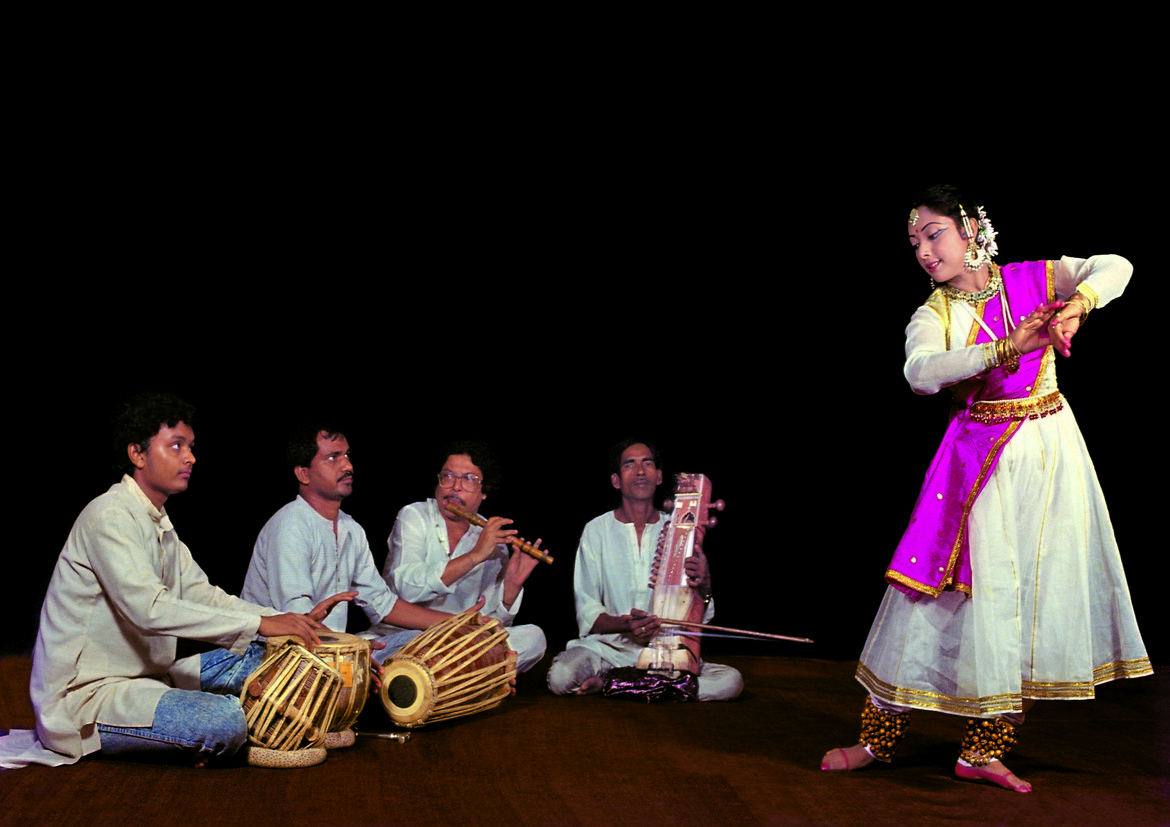
- Saswati Sen in 2014
- Born: 25 August 1953 (age 73); Chittaranjan, West Bengal, India
- Occupations: Kathak dancer, choreographer and teacher
- Organization(s): Kalashram Institute, Delhi
- Known for: Lucknow gharana of Kathak
- Awards: Sangeet Natak Akademi Award (2004)

Saswati Sen (born 25 August 1953) is an Indian Kathak dancer, choreographer and teacher. She is regarded as a leading exponent of the Lucknow gharana and has been particularly noted for her abhinaya. A senior disciple and long-time dance partner of Birju Maharaj, she teaches and performs at the Kalashram Institute he founded in New Delhi. (Note: First located in Jor Bagh, later moving to Gulmohar Park.)

== Biography ==
Born in Chittaranjan, West Bengal into a Bengali family. Her parents' families were legal and medical professionals; they were also active participants in Bengali theatre. Sen was educated in Delhi, and completed schooling from Lady Irwin School, Delhi in 1968. Sen began her Kathak training under Kathak guru, Reba Vidyarthi at Kathak Kendra, New Delhi, before becoming a disciple of Birju Maharaj in 1967.

She went on to work alongside Birju Maharaj for more than four decades as his dance partner and senior disciple, and later as a teacher at his Kalashram Institute in New Delhi. She also appeared as a Kathak dancer in Satyajit Ray's film Shatranj Ke Khilari (1977).

Sen received a Sangeet Natak Akademi Award in 2004.
