= Prerana Shrimali =

Senior dancer of Jaipur Gharana of Kathak

Prerana Shrimali is a senior dancer of Jaipur Gharana of Kathak. Born in Banswara in Rajasthan, Shrimati Prerana Shrimali was initiated in Kathak dance by Guru Shri Kundan lal Gangani in Jaipur. Later, she was groomed in the art at Kathak Kendra, New Delhi, under the same Guru late Shri Kundan Lal Gangani of the Jaipur gharana. She has also choreographed several productions and has participated in several international dance seminars and conferences. She has also taught young dancers at Gandharva Mahavidyalaya and Shriram Bharatiya Kala Kendra. She has served as Repertory Chief of the Kathak Kendra, Delhi from the year 2007 to 2009, and later served as a senior guru in Kathak kendra Delhi from 2012 to2017. Shrimati Prerna Shrimali has been awarded the Rajasthan Sangeet Natak Akademi Award and the Rashtriya Ekta Award of the Rajiv Gandhi Foundation. Her dance has been featured in the film The Far Pavilions produced by BBC. Shrimati Prerana Shrimali was awarded central Sangeet Natak Akademi Award for the year 2009 by the president of India for her contribution to Kathak dance. Now she is based in Jaipur, Rajasthan and started her own institute 'KALAAVART' Prerana Shrimali centre of Kathak in 2021.

== Awards and honours ==
- 1981 Shringarmani SurSingar Samsad, Bombay
- 1986 Kalashri Shri Sangeet Bharti, Bikaner
- 1988 YuvaRatna Jaipur Jaycees, Jaipur
- 1989 Rajasthan Yuva Ratna Rajasthan Yuvajan Pravaritti Samaj, Jaipur
- 1989 Shrikant Verma Rashtriya Puraskaar Bhartiya Kalyan Parishad, New Delhi
- 1990 Prashasti Tamrapatra Rajasthan Samaroha, Jaipur
- 1993 Rajasthan Sangeet Natak Academy Award Rajasthan Sangeet Natak Academy
- 1996 Adhaarshila Puraskaar Group of Journalists, Writers & Artists, Delhi
- 2001 Rashtriya Ekta Award 57th Birth Anniversary of Rajiv Gandhi
- 2004 Raza Puraskaar Raza Foundation, Delhi
- 2008 Keshav Smriti Award Kaladharmi, Delhi
- 2010 10th Vimla Devi Samman Vimla Devi Foundation, Ayodhya
