= Shambhu Maharaj =

Indian dancer (1910–1970)

- Born: 1910; Lucknow, United Provinces of Agra and Oudh, British India
- Died: 4 November 1970 (aged 59–60); New Delhi, India
- Occupation: Indian classical music dancer
- Years active: 1952–1970
- Known for: Padma Shri, Sangeet Natak Akademi Fellowship
- Relatives: Lachhu Maharaj (brother)

Pandit Shambhu Maharaj (1910 – 4 November 1970) was a Guru of the Lucknow Gharana (school) of the Indian classical dance form, Kathak. Padma Shree Award -1958 Sangeet Natak Academic Award -1967

== Early life and training ==
Shambhu Maharaj was born in Lucknow as Shambhunath Mishra. He was the youngest son of Kalka Prasad Maharaj who was at the court of the Nawab of Awadh Wajid Ali Shah. Kalka Prasad's father was Thakur Prasad was known to have taught the intricacies of Kathak to the Nawab. While reporting Shambhu's death in 1970, The Indian Express wrote, "The Kathak, as we know it today, can be wholly traced to this dilettante's patronage and the body of work written at his court for this mode of dance." Shambhu received his training from his father, uncle Bindadin Maharaj and his eldest brother Achchan Maharaj. Dancer Lacchu Maharaj was also another his older brothers. He learned Hindustani classical music from Ustad Rahimuddin Khan.

== Career ==
In 1952, he joined the Bharatiya Kala Kendra (later, Kathak Kendra), New Delhi. He became the head of the Dance (Kathak) department. He was honoured with the Sangeet Natak Akademi Fellowship in 1967 and the Padmashri in 1958.

== Personal ==
He had two sons, Krishnamohan and Rammohan and a daughter, Rameshwari. Amongst his pupils, the most noted exponents of Kathak are his nephew Birju Maharaj, Kumudini Lakhia, Damayanti Joshi, Maya Rao, Bharati Gupta, Uma Sharma, Vibha Dadheech and Rina Singha. His son Rammohan was also his disciple and continues to perform his style. Shambhu was treated for throat cancer at the All India Institutes of Medical Sciences in New Delhi for three months before he died on 4 November 1970 there.

Harsh Mohan Mishra is the son of Pt. Ram Mohan Maharaj and nephew of Lt. Pt. Birju Maharaj, who is a renowned Film Maker and Visual Effects Supervisor in Bollywood Industry.
