= National Institute of Kathak Dance =

National Institute of Kathak Dance (Kathak Kendra)
- Formation: 1964
- Headquarters: Plot No 2 San Martin Marg, Chanakyapuri, New Delhi-21
- Location: India
- Parent organisation: Sangeet Natak Akademi
- Website: www.kathakkendra.in

National Institute of Kathak Dance, also known as Kathak Kendra, is the premier dance institution for the Indian classical dance form of Kathak, and a unit of the Sangeet Natak Akademi, India's National Academy of Music, Dance and Drama, situated in New Delhi. Established in 1964, the institution is primarily dedicated to Kathak, though it also offers courses in Hindustani classical music (Vocal) and Pakhawaj and Tabla.

== History ==
The end of princely states in post-independence after 1947, brought an end of royal patronage to Kathak exponents as well as gurus. Many started teaching privately. Earlier, under the patronage of Awadh state, Lachhu Maharaj moved to Bombay, while his brother, Shambhu Maharaj, and his nephew moved to Delhi in 1955. Kathak Kendra was originally established as the Kathak wing of the Shriram Bharatiya Kala Kendra, in 1955, through the efforts of Nirmala Joshi, the first secretary of the Sangeet Natak Akademi, under the patronage of Sumitra Charat Ram, wife of industrialist, Lala Charat Ram of Shriram Group. Here Pandit Shambhu Maharaj, celebrated Guru of the Lucknow Gharana (school) of Kathak, was head of the department. In 1964 the institution became a part of the Sangeet Natak Akademi and in July 1969, the Akademi took over its functioning as well, and moved it to its new location at the nearby former Bahawalpur House, which also houses the National School of Drama. Shambhu Maharaj was a noted exponent of the bhava anga (emotive part), and, in the coming years, revived several classical thumris and bhajans and added them to Kathak repertoire. He trained several students who subsequently made a name for themselves, including Kumudini Lakhia, Damayanti Joshi, Bharti Gupta, Gopi Krishna, Maya Rao and Sitara.

Shambhu Maharaj received the highest award of the Sangeet Natak Akademi, the Sangeet Natak Akademi Fellowship in 1967. After the death of Shambhu Maharaj in 1970, his nephew Birju Maharaj, who was associated with the institution from its inception, and a noted Kathak dancer and guru in his own right, became the Head of Faculty and also remained the Director of the institution for many years. Birju Maharaj started adapting the dance, which was till now staged for small gatherings in temple courtyards or Mehfils to one catering to large gatherings in the modern proscenium theatre, and created several noted ballets in his period. Gradually what was essentially a solo-dance, moved towards expression in group performances. Over the years the repertory wing, formerly known as 'Ballet Unit' has created notable production of Kathak ballet, with evolved stage and costume design as well as elaborate music, Taj ki Kahani (1966) was choreographed by Krishna Kumar, and had music by Amjad Ali, Shan-e-audh (1968), Kumara Sambhav and Dalia all choreographed by Birju Maharaj and with music by Dagar Brothers. Several of the productions, like Govardhan Leela, Machan Chori, Phag Bhara employed mythological themes and gave them modern presentation. Birju Maharaj performed these ballet productions all over the world, giving the traditional dance form, worldwide recognition. Many former students of the Kendra, also joined the repertory wing as registered staff.

The Kendra also became a venue for innovation in the form and presentation style of Kathak, merging formats from both the Lucknow and Jaipur gharana in the coming decades. This was also the period of experimental works, which showed a progression away from the canonical motifs and themes of Kathak, like Radha Krishna, Chhed Chhad, Gat Bhav and Tode Tukde. In 1980, when Keshav Kothari was the Director at the Kendra and also Secretary of Sangeet Natak Akademi, a work title, Parikrama was choreographed by Birju Maharaj, in which Kathak was used to depict the natural rhythm that runs through all animate objects. In 1982, Kathak Kendra started organising two national-level Kathak festivals annually, 'Kalka Bindadin Festival' and 'Sharad Chandrika Festival', focussing of group and solo performances respectively. This also provided a common platform of dancers from both Lucknow and Jaipur gharana to allow mingling of ideas and facilitate innovations. After having received the Sangeet Natak Akademi Award at the age of 28, Birju Maharaj received India's second highest civilian honour, the Padma Vibhushan in 1986.

Birju Maharaj retired in 1998, when retirement age was implemented at performing arts institutions as well thereafter he started his own Kathak and Indian fine arts academy, Kalashram in Delhi. A few years later, another noted guru at the Kendra, Munna Shukla also retired, he now teaches at Bhartiya Kala Kendra and teaches in East Delhi.

In time, Uttar Pradesh Government, established a state Kathak Kendra in Lucknow in 1973, with Lachhu Maharaj, brother of Shambu Maharaj as its founding director, and Rajasthan Government established, Jaipur Kathak Kendra. Both places are known for their respective gharanas of Kathak.

== Overview ==
Apart from the main centre at Bahawalpur House, the Kendra also runs two additional centres in the city, one each in North Delhi and South Delhi:

- Kathak Kendra main building, Chanakyapuri New Delhi
- Kathak Centre (North), Kingsway Camp

The Kendra also has a Repertory Wing which performs at many places, and works towards evolving techniques of Kathak dance through experimental work.

  - freeship facility for candidates

== Courses ==
- Elementary Courses
  - 5-year Foundation Course - (Age Limit: 10 to 15 years)
  - 3-year Diploma (Pass) Course - (Age Limit: 15 to 20 years)
- Advanced Courses
  - 3-year Diploma (Hons.) Course (Age limit: 18 to 23 years)
  - 2-year Post Diploma Course (Age limit: 20 to 26 years)

== Notable alumni ==
- Saswati Sen
- Mangala Bhatt
- Maya Rao
- Raghav Raj Bhatt
- Rajendra Gangani
- Véronique Azan
- Munmun Ahmed
