= Rajendra Gangani =

Indian Kathak dancer

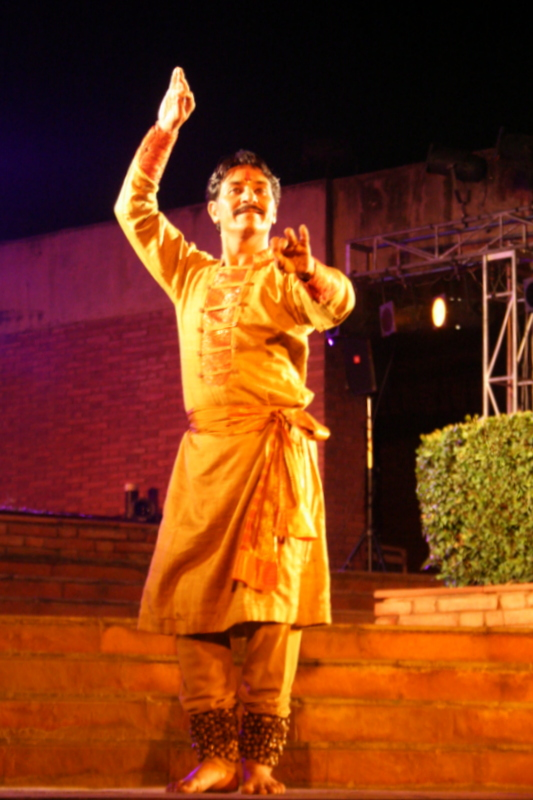
- Rajendra Gangani performing at an event
- Education: Kathak Kendra, Delhi
- Occupation: Kathak Dancer

Rajendra Gangani is an Indian Kathak dancer known for his innovative style and technical wizardry. Gangani is one of the leading exponents of the Jaipur Gharana style of Kathak. For his contributions to the field of Kathak, Gangani received the Sangeet Natak Akademi Award in 2003 from The President of India A. P. J. Abdul Kalam.

== Early life ==
Pt.Rajendra Gangani started his training of kathak at the early age of four. Pandit Rajendra Gangani is the disciple and son of Pt. Kundanlal Gangani of Jaipur Gharana.

== Career ==
Pt. Rajendra Gangani began his journey as a Kathak dancer when he was 4 year old being son of legendary kathak exponent Kundan Lal Gangani and torch bearer of Jaipur Gharana. Rajendra completed his graduation from the Kathak Kendra, Delhi in the year 1983–84. Rajendra has choreographed several group compositions and dance dramas to standing ovations and rave reviews. He also produced a large number of thematic items like Leele-Varnan, Raag Vistaar, Tribandhi, Sargam, Zhalak, Srijan, Kavitakriti, Maharaas, Parikrama etc.
