= Lucknow gharana =

Indian discipleship tradition

The Lucknow Gharānā, also known as "Purab Gharâna" for tabla, is a discipleship tradition ("gharana") with a tabla legacy and Kathak legacy. These two traditions are known for being one of the six major gharanas of tabla and three gharanas of kathak.

== Exponents ==
=== Kathak ===
- Durga Prasad Mishra (c. 1800–1880), father and guru of Bindadin Maharaj and Kalka Prasad Mishra.
- Thakur Prasad Misha (c. 1800–1880), uncle and guru of Bindadin Maharaj and Kalka Prasad Mishra.
- Bindadin Maharaj (1830–1918), co-founder of the gharana. Disciple of father, Durga Prasad Mishra, and uncle, Thakur Prasad Mishra.
- Kalka Prasad Mishra (1842–1913), co-founder of the gharana. Disciple of father, Durga Prasad Mishra, and uncle, Thakur Prasad Mishra.
- Acchan Maharaj (1883–1960), son and disciple of father Kalka Prasad Mishra.
- Lacchu Maharaj (1901–1978), son and disciple of father Kalka Prasad Mishra.
- Shambhu Maharaj (1910–1970), son and disciple of father Kalka Prasad Mishra.
- Birju Maharaj (1938–2022), foremost kathak performer of the 20th Century. Son and disciple of Acchan Maharaj. Also learned from uncles Lacchu Maharaj and Shambhu Maharaj.
- Jai Kishan Maharj Son and disciple of Birju Maharaj.
- Ram Mohan Maharaj Son and disciple of Shambhu Maharaj, Also learned from Brother Pt. Birju Maharaj.
- Saswati Sen (b. 1953) senior disciple of Birju Maharaj

=== Tabla ===
- Miyan Bakshu
- Mia Salari khan
- Ustad Babu Kha
- Ustad Chotten Khan
- Nogendra nath Bose
- Manmathanath Ganguly
- Acharya Pt. Hirendra Kumar Ganguli (Hiru Babu)
- Tapas Kumar Ganguli son of Acharya Hirendra Kumar Ganguli
- Abid Hussain khan
- Jahangir Khan
- Biru Mishra (disciple of ustad abid Hussain Khan also learnt beneras gharana)
- Wajid Hussain Khan
- Afaq Hussain Khan
- Ilmas Hussain Khan
- Santosh Krishna Biswas
- Kanai Dutta Disciple of Hemant Bhattacharya who is the disciple of Pt. Manmanath Ganguly, disciple of Ustad Babu Khan of Lucknow Gharana.
- Swapan Chaudhuri (b. 1945), disciple of Santosh Krishna Biswas.
- S. R. Chishti (b. 1965), disciple of Afaq Hussain Khan.
- Ustad Julfikar Hussain disciple of Khalifa Ustad Afaq Hussain khan.
- Pandit Swaraj Bhattacharya
- Hemanta Bhattacharya
- Bhibhuti Bhusan Bhattacharya (disciple of Hemanta Bhattacharya)
- Pandit Ashok Maitra
- Sri Ujjal Roy
- Sri Shubhrangshu Das
- Debasish Talukdar disciple of Ustad Julfikar Hussain (Lucknow Gharana) also learnt beneras gharana Dr.Manoj Kumar Mishra
