= Lachhu Maharaj =

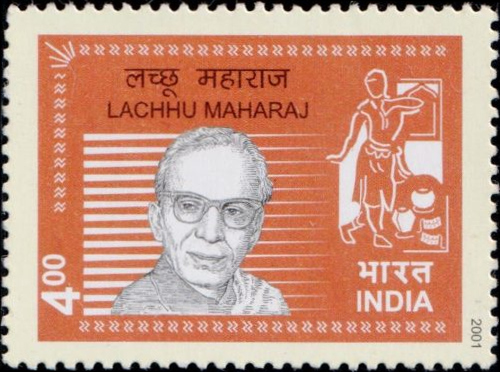
- Maharaj on a 2001 stamp of India

Background information
- Born: 1 September 1901; Lucknow, North-Western Provinces, British India
- Origin: India
- Died: 19 July 1978 (aged 76) Lucknow, Uttar Pradesh, India
- Genres: Indian classical music
- Occupation: Classical dancer

Pandit Bajinath Prasad also known as Pandit Lachhu Maharaj (1901–1978) was an Indian classical dancer and choreographer of Kathak dance. He came from a family of illustrious Kathak exponents in Lucknow, and also worked as film choreographer, Hindi cinema, most notably Mughal-e-Azam (1960) and Pakeezah (1972). He was awarded the 1957 Sangeet Natak Akademi Award, the highest award for performing artists, conferred by the Sangeet Natak Akademi, India's National Academy for Music, Dance and Drama. He was paternal uncle of Pandit Birju Maharaj.

== Early life and training ==
He received extensive training from Pandit Bindadin Maharaj, his uncle and the court dancer of the Nawab of Awadh, for nearly ten years. He also learnt the Pakhawaj, the Tabla and Hindustani Classical vocal music.

== Career ==
Later, he moved to Mumbai, where the emerging film industry helped him to bring Kathak to a far wider audience. Lachhu Maharaj was acclaimed for the choreography of dance sequences in movies like Mahal (1949), Mughal-e-Azam (1960), Chhoti Chhoti Baten (1965) and Pakeezah (1972) as well as his ballets like Goutam Buddha, Chandravali and Bharatiya Kissan. He was also the founder Director of the Kathak Kendra started by the Uttar Pradesh Government in Lucknow.

== Awards ==
Among many prestigious awards he won were the Presidents' Award and the 1957 Sangeet Natak Akademi Award, the highest award for performing artists, conferred by the Sangeet Natak Akademi, India's National Academy for Music, Dance and Drama.

== Legacy ==
In September 2007, a two-day festival was organized in Lucknow to celebrate his birth centenary, in presence of his wife Rama Devi, his disciples like Nalini and Kamalini, a book on him was also released and students of the dance institution he founded, Kathak Kendra staged a ballet, Megh Malhar.

== See also ==
- List of Kathak dancers
