= Indian Council for Cultural Relations =

Autonomous organisation of the Government of India

- Abbreviation: ICCR
- Formation: 9 April 1950; 76 years ago
- Type: Governmental organization
- Headquarters: Azad Bhawan, I. P Estate, New Delhi - 110002
- Region served: Worldwide
- President: Vacant
- Director General: K. Nandini Singla
- Main organ: Governing Body
- Parent organisation: Government of India
- Affiliations: Ministry of External Affairs
- Website: iccr.gov.in

The Indian Council for Cultural Relations (ICCR) is an autonomous organisation of the Government of India, involved in India's global cultural relations, through cultural exchange with other countries and their people. It was founded on 9 April 1950 by Maulana Abul Kalam Azad, the first Education Minister of independent India.

The ICCR Headquarter is situated at Azad Bhawan, I.P. Estate, New Delhi, with regional offices in Bengaluru, Guwahati, Kolkata, Lucknow, Mumbai, Patna, Pune, Shillong, Jammu and Ahmedabad. The council also operates missions internationally, with established cultural centres in Georgetown, Paramaribo, Port Louis, Jakarta, Moscow, Valladolid, Berlin, Cairo, London (Nehru Centre, London), Tashkent, Almaty, Johannesburg, Durban, Port of Spain and Colombo. ICCR has opened new cultural centers in Dhaka, Thimphu, São Paulo, Kathmandu, Bangkok, Kuala Lumpur and Tokyo.

== Activities ==
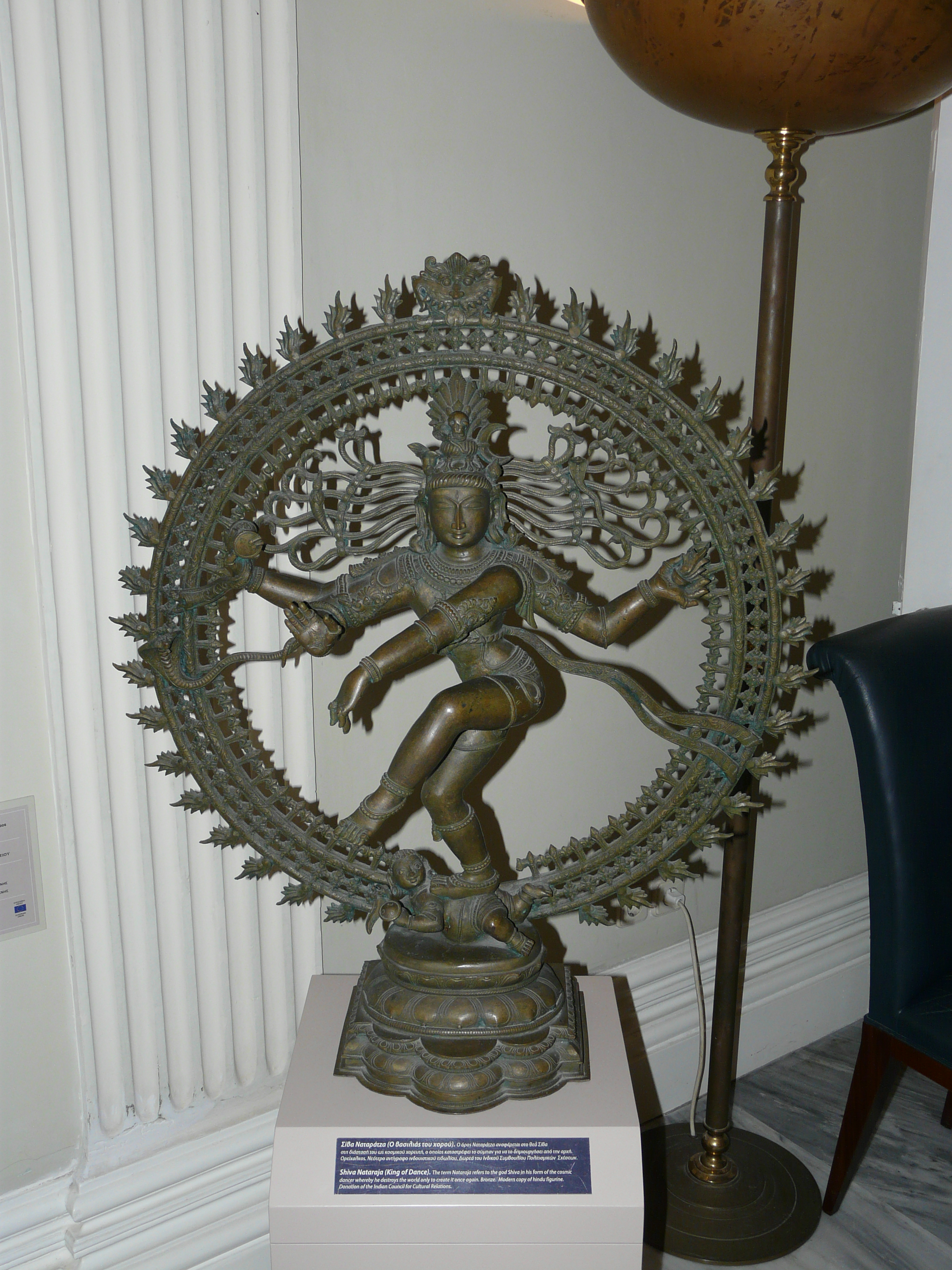
Copy of the Hindu figurine of Shiva Nataraja, donation to the Museum of Asian Art of Corfu, Greece

The Council addresses its mandate of cultural diplomacy through a broad range of activities. In addition to organising cultural festivals in India and overseas, the ICCR financially supports a number of cultural institutions across India, and sponsors individual performers in dance, music, photography, theatre, and the visual arts. It also administers the Jawaharlal Nehru Award for International Understanding, established by the Government of India in 1965, whose last award was in 2009.

=== Publications ===
Six quarterly journals, are published in five different languages:

Journal	Language
Indian Horizons	English
Africa Quarterly	English
Gagananchal	Hindi
Papeles de la India	Spanish
Rencontre Avec I' Inde	French
Thaqafat-ul-Hind	Arabic
