= Birju Maharaj =

Indian dancer, singer, and composer (1938–2022)

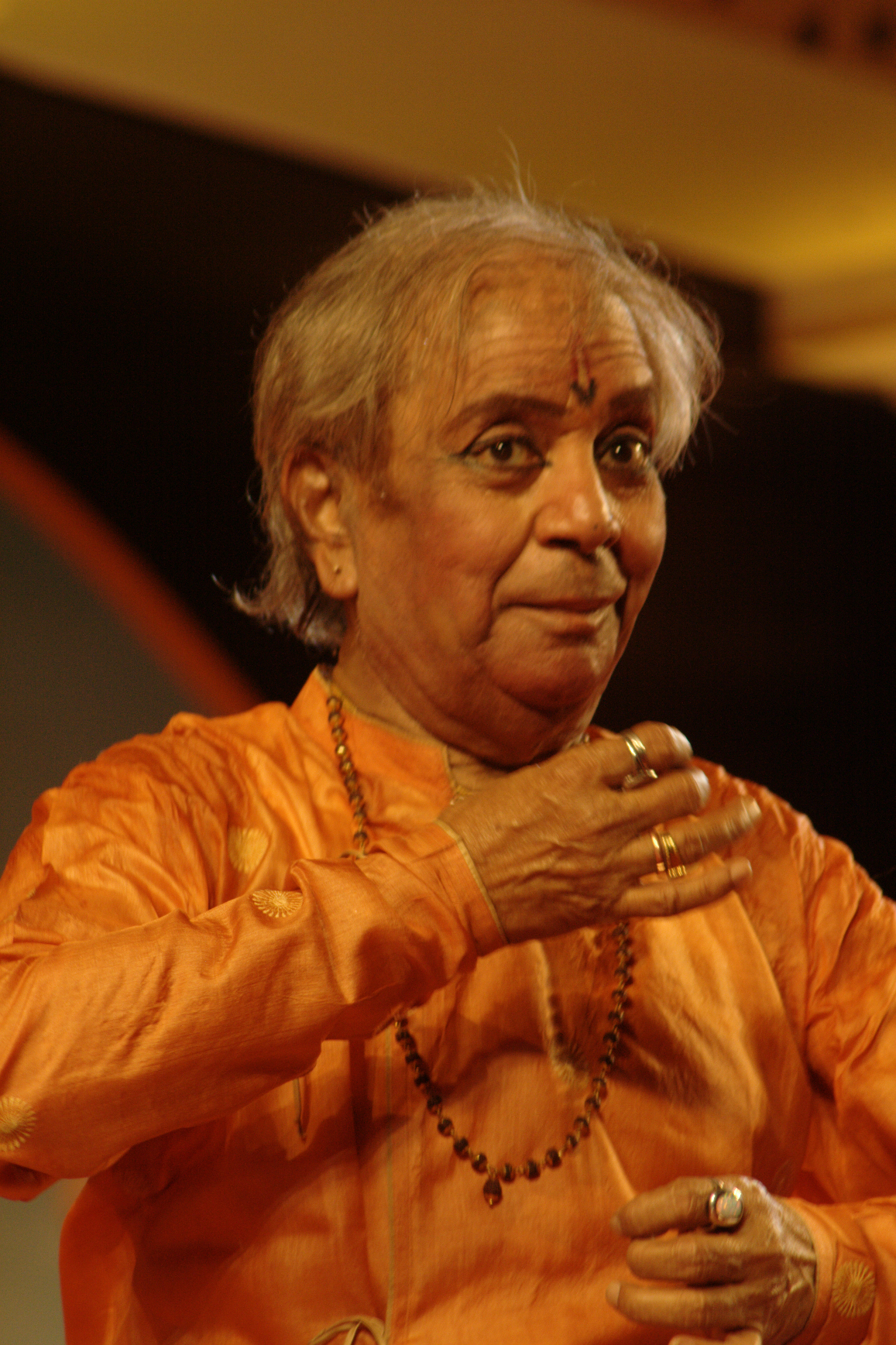
- Maharaj performing in Pune, April 2012

Background information
- Born: Brijmohan Nath Mishra; 4 February 1938; Handia, United Provinces, British India (present-day Uttar Pradesh, India)
- Died: 17 January 2022 (aged 83) Delhi, India
- Genres: Indian classical dance (Kathak); Hindustani classical music
- Occupations: Dancer; Choreographer; Composer; Singer
- Years active: 1951–2016
- Website: birjumaharaj-kalashram.com
- Relatives: Acchan Maharaj (father); Shambhu Maharaj (uncle); Lachhu Maharaj (uncle)

Birju Maharaj (born Brijmohan Nath Mishra; 4 February 1938 – 17 January 2022) was an Indian dancer, choreographer, composer, singer, and a leading exponent and teacher of the Lucknow "Kalka-Bindadin" Gharana of Kathak dance in India. He was a descendant of the renowned Maharaj family of Kathak dancers, which includes his two uncles, Shambhu Maharaj and Lachhu Maharaj, and his father and guru, Acchan Maharaj. He also practiced Hindustani classical music and was a vocalist. After working along with his uncle, Shambhu Maharaj at Shriram Bharatiya Kala Kendra, later the Kathak Kendra, New Delhi, he remained head of the latter, for several years, until his retirement in 1998 when he opened his own dance school, Kalashram, also located in Delhi.

Birju Maharaj was one of the recipients of the Padma Vibhushan, India's second-highest civilian honor, in 1986.

== Early life ==
Maharaj was born Brijmohan Nath Mishra, on 4 February 1938 into a Hindu Brahmin family in Handia of Allahabad district. His father was the Kathak exponent, Jagannath Maharaj, popularly known as Acchan Maharaj of Lucknow gharana and the Kalka-Bindadin family in Lucknow. His father served as the court dancer in Raigarh princely state. Maharaj started dancing early at the age of four, and was trained by his uncles, Lachhu Maharaj and Shambhu Maharaj and his father. He started his performances first at his father's concerts before performing solo at the age of seven in West Bengal. His father died when Maharaj was nine.

== Career ==
Maharaj started teaching the dance form at the age of fourteen, at the Sangeet Bharti in New Delhi. He then taught at the Bharatiya Kala Kendra in Delhi, and at the Kathak Kendra (a unit of the Sangeet Natak Akademi) where he was Head of Faculty, and director, retiring in 1998 after which he opened his own dance school, Kalashram, also in Delhi.

In addition to performing the Kathak dance form, he also brought along knowledge of Hindustani classical music and percussion instruments. He was noted to have been able to sing the thumri while dancing to it, and also playing instruments like the tabla and the dholak. His Kathak performances in addition to mythological stories had contemporary elements including stories from daily life and social issues being communicated by way of the dance. His ginti ki tihaais (transl. a charged and percussive phrase, repeated thrice to end with explosive effect) were noted to have been studied by Kathak students. He collaborated with other artists including the tabla player Zakir Hussain, and singers Rajan and Sajan Mishra. Some of his students included Priti Singh, Saswati Sen, Aditi Mangaldas, Saju Ahammed and Nisha Mahajan.

Maharaj also choreographed and composed music for many Indian movies. Some of the performances that he choreographed included for Saswati Sen in Satyajit Ray's Shatranj ke Khiladi (1977), Madhuri Dixit in Dil To Pagal Hai (1997), Devdas (2002) and Dedh Ishqiya (2014), Kamal Haasan in Vishwaroopam (2012), Deepika Padukone in Bajirao Mastani (2015) and Alia Bhatt in Kalank (2019). His choreography for Kamal Hassan in Vishwaroopam won him the National Film Award for Best Choreography in 2012, while his choreography for Deepika Padukone in Bajirao Mastani won him a Filmfare Award for Best Choreography in 2016.

Maharaj was one of the youngest artists to receive the Sangeet Natak Akademi Award, when he received the award at the age of 28. He also received the Padma Vibhushan, India's second highest civilian award, in 1986.

== Personal life ==
In 1956, Maharaj married Annapurna Devi, a daughter of Pandit Chandra Mishra of Varanasi, who was also a guru of singer Girija Devi. The couple had two sons and three daughters. Annapurna Devi died in 2008. In later life, Maharaj had kidney disease and diabetes, and received dialysis. He died of a heart attack at his residence in Delhi, on 16 January 2022, at age 83.

== Awards and honours ==
- 1964 – Sangeet Natak Akademi Award
- 1986 – Padma Vibhushan
- 1986 – Nritya Choodamani Award by Sri Krishna Gana Sabha
- 1987 – Kalidas Samman
- 2002 – Lata Mangeshkar Puraskar
- honorary doctorate from Indira Kala Sangeet Vishwavidyalaya
- Honorary doctorate from Banaras Hindu University
- Sangam Kala Award
- Bharat Muni Sammaan
- Andhra Ratna
- Nritya Vilas Award
- Adharshila Shikhar Samman
- Soviet Land Nehru Award
- National Nritya Shiromani Award
- Rajiv Gandhi National Sadbhavana Award
- Newsmakers Achievers Award in 2017

=== Film ===
- 2012 – National Film Award for Best Choreography for Unnai Kaanaathu (Vishwaroopam)
- 2016 – Filmfare Award for Best Choreography for Mohe Rang Do Laal (Bajirao Mastani)

== Controversy ==
In the immediate aftermath of Birju Maharaj's passing away, multiple victims came forward on social media to share stories of being sexually harassed by him from body shaming to asking for sex as a bribe. These allegations were made by former students and other women who had trained in Kathak, were largely shared anonymously on social media. They emerged after Kathak dancer and teacher Naina Roychowdhury Green began sharing accounts that women had sent to her following his death.

This led to a wider public discourse about the need to re-examine the power imbalances in the Guru-shishya tradition of Indian classical arts. Artists also commented on the authority traditionally accorded to gurus leading their inordinate influence over students' professional careers and inadequate institutional redressal mechanisms in the performing arts.

== See also ==
- List of Kathak dancers
- Māni Mādhava Chākyār
