= Andreea Bibiri =

Romanian actress

- Born: May 3, 1975 (age 51); Bucharest
- Education: Caragiale Academy of Theatrical Arts and Cinematography
- Occupations: Actress, Dubber and Theatre director
- Years active: 1995–present
- Television: Offset (2006); În derivă (2010-2012); Of Snails and Men (2012)

Andreea Bibiri (born May 3, 1975) is a Romanian film and stage actress, dubber and theatre director. She graduated from the Caragiale Academy of Theatrical Arts and Cinematography in 1996 and has won two UNITER Prize awards as an actress. She is best known outside Romania for the role of Ana, in Tudor Giurgiu's "Of Snails and Men".

== Biography ==
Andreea Bibiri inherited a passion for film from her father when, before the Romanian Revolution of 1989. He came back from his many travels abroad with new materials of music and movies.

In the early 90s, Andreea went to the United States for further education but after a short period she returned to Romania to pursue acting.

She graduated from the Caragiale Academy of Theatrical Arts and Cinematography in 1996 and in the same year, after several roles during university, she made her debut at the Bulandra Theatre with the personage Eleva (The pupil) in The Lesson written by Eugène Ionesco and with her first TV appearance in the film State of Things.

Meanwhile, she increased her theater work, in 1998 she dubbed a character from "The Lion King II: Simba's Pride", the first of many cartoons.

In 2001, she performed at the Bulandra Theatre as the character Sonya in "Uncle Vanya" written by Anton Chekhov. This was one of the most appreciated roles of her career and for which she is nominalized for "The UNITER Award for Best Actress". The show, directed by Yuri Kordonsky, ran successfully at the Festival Internacional Cervantino in Mexico but also in Italy. In 2014, after 13 years from the premiere, it was recorded and broadcast on TVR2.

Sonya and Agafya from Nikolai Gogol's play "Marriage" (2003) are the most enduring roles, surpassing the 150 performances along over a decade.

In 2002, Andreea became better known to a wider audience through the role "Eva Antal" of the first Romanian soap opera "În familie" (In family) produced by Prima TV. She also recorded acoustic performances for radio theater.

In 2004 she received "The UARF Award" for her role in the film "Damen Tango" granted by "The Union of Authors and Film Producers from Romania" and in 2005 at UNITER Gala she won "The Award for Best Supporting Actress" in "Forma lucrurilor", Romanian version of "The Shape of Things" written by Neil LaBute.

The following year, after more than a decade after her theatrical debut, she played her first role as a 'baddie' as Silvia Damian in the telenovela "Daria, iubirea mea" (Daria, my love) produced by Acasă TV. In 2007, Andreea was the winner of "The UNITER Award for Best Actress" for the character Grace in "Purificare", Romanian version of "Cleansed" by Sarah Kane performed at Cluj-Napoca National Theatre.

Between 2010 and 2012 Andreea portrays Ruxandra in the two seasons of the HBO's TV series "În derivă" about psychotherapy.

Andreea starred also in the comedy film "Of Snails and Men" that received multiple awards at Valladolid International Film Festival, Warsaw International Film Festival, South East European Film Festival and many more.

In 2013, Andreea began a new phase of her career, debuting as a Theatre director with the shows "Shot sau Comedia relațiilor" (Shot or comedy relations) and "Moș Crăciun e o jigodie" (Santa Claus Is a Stinker) and in 2014 she performs for the first time the Improvisational Theatre at "Comedy Show" in Bucharest.

In 2016, she played again for TVR 2 the role of Varya in "The Cherry Orchard", the last play by Russian playwright Anton Chekhov.

After 21 years of career at Bucharest's Art Theatre, she performed in her first one-woman play directed by Daniel Grigore-Simion: "A woman alone” by Dario Fo and Franca Rame.

== Filmography ==
=== Films ===
Year	Original Title	Adapted title	Role	Directed by	Notes
1996	Stare de fapt	State of Things	The Secretary	Stere Gulea	
1999	Fii cu ochii pe fericire	Keep an eye on happiness	TV Reporter	Alexandru Maftei	
2003	Niki Ardelean, colonel în rezervă	Niki and Flo	Irina Ardelean	Lucian Pintilie	
2004	Damen Tango	Damen Tango	Corina	Dinu Tănase	
2005	Neuitate personaje	Unforgettable characters	Herself	George Banu & Dominic Dembinski	Documentary Film
2006	Iubire cu pumnul	Love with the fist	Lăcrămioara	Ana Mărgineanu	
2006	Și totul era nimic...	And it was nothing ...	Irina	Cristina Nichitus	
2006	Răzbunarea	The revenge	Miruna	Adrian Sitaru	
2006	Offset	Offset	Wedding shop sales girl	Didi Danquart	
2009	Fratelui meu din exil	To my brother in exile	Herself	Ana Boariu	Documentary Film
2012	Despre oameni și melci	Of snails and men	Ana	Tudor Giurgiu	
2014	De ce au dispărut dinozaurii	Why the dinosaurs disappeared	The mother	Mihai Ghiță	Short Film
2014	Unchiul Vanea	Uncle Vanya	Sonya	Yuri Kordonsky	Theatre
2016	Livada de vișini	The Cherry Orchard	Varya	Alexandru Lustig	Theatre
2022	Metronom	Metronom	Ana's mother	Alexandru Belc	

=== TV series ===
Year	Original Title	Adapted title	Role	Directed by	Notes
2001	Vertiges (Mauvais présage)	Vertiges (Mauvais présage)	Balerina	Philippe Monpontet	
2002	În familie	In family	Eva Antal	Adrian Sitaru & Radu Jude	
2006	Daria, iubirea mea	Daria, my love	Silvia Damian	Alex Fotea	Negative Role
2009	Doctori de mame	Mothers and doctors	Drugged mother	Peter Kerek & Craig Lines	1 episode
2010	În derivă	Drifting	Ruxandra	Adrian Sitaru & Titus Munteanu	
2012	În derivă II	Drifting II	Ruxandra	Adrian Sitaru & Titus Munteanu	
2015	Lecții de viață	Life lessons	Ileana Corbu	Titus Scurt	1 episode

== Theatrical works ==
Year	Romanian Original Title	English Adapted title	Role	Written by	Directed by	Theatre
1995	Lecția	The Lesson	Pupil	Eugène Ionesco	Vlad Massaci	Bulandra Theatre
1996	Ultimele știri	Last news	The neighbor	Adrian Dohotaru	Mara Pașici	Bulandra Theatre
1997	Turandot	Turandot	Adelma	Carlo Gozzi	Cătălina Buzoianu	Bulandra Theatre
1997	Trei femei înalte	Three Tall Women	C Woman	Edward Albee	Vlad Massaci	Comedy Theatre, Bucharest
1997	Năzdrăvanul Occidentului	The Playboy of the Western World	Pegeen Mike	John Millington Synge	Nona Ciobanu	National Theatre Bucharest
1998	Trandafirii roșii	Red roses	Crina	Zaharia Bârsan	Vlad Massaci	Bulandra Theatre
1998	Libertinul	The libertine	The young D'Holbach	Éric-Emmanuel Schmitt	Alexandru Tocilescu	Bulandra Theatre
1999	Regele Lear	King Lear	Goneril	William Shakespeare	Dragoș Galgoțiu	Bulandra Theatre
2001	Există nervi	Nerves do exist	Woman extra	Marin Sorescu	Șerban Puiu	Bulandra Theatre
2001	Unchiul Vanea	Uncle Vanya	Sonya	Anton Chekhov	Yuri Kordonsky	Bulandra Theatre
2001	Zi că-i bine!	Tell you that it's okay!	Sandy	Wil Calhoun	Florin Piersic, Jr.	Green Hours Theatre, Bucharest
2003	Căsătoria	Marriage	Agafya	Nikolai Gogol	Yuri Kordonsky	Bulandra Theatre
2003	Fata de pe canapea	The girl on the sofa	Little Sara	Jon Fosse	Iulian Suman	Act Theatre, Bucharest
2004	Punami	Punami	Punami II	Ștefan Peca	Alexandru Berceanu	Bulandra Theatre
2004	Preludiu prelungit	Extended prelude (Do over)	Betty	Frederick Stroppel	Alexandru Berceanu	Green Hours Theatre, Bucharest
2004	Forma lucrurilor	The Shape of Things	Jenny	Neil LaBute	Vlad Massaci	Act Theatre, Bucharest
2005	Henric al IV-lea	Henry IV	Frida	Luigi Pirandello	Liviu Ciulei	Bulandra Theatre
2005	Șase personaje în căutarea unui autor	Six Characters in Search of an Author	Stepdaughter	Luigi Pirandello	Liviu Ciulei	Bulandra Theatre
2005	America știe tot	America knows everything	The girl	Nicole Duțu	Radu Afrim	Green Hours Theatre, Bucharest
2005	România 21	Romania 21	Mio	Ștefan Peca	Ștefan Peca	Green Hours Theatre, Bucharest
2006	Purificare	Cleansed	Grace	Sarah Kane	Andrei Șerban	Cluj-Napoca National Theatre
2006	Pescărușul	The Seagull	Nina Zarecinaia	Anton Chekhov	Andrei Șerban	Radu Stanca National Theatre
2008	Lear	King Lear	Edgar	William Shakespeare	Andrei Șerban	Bulandra Theatre
2008	Concreții	Concretions	Masha	Vladimir Sorokin	Alexandru Mihăescu	Green Hours Theatre, Bucharest
2009	Undo '90	Undo '90	Lisa	Frederick Stroppel & Andreea Bibiri	Radu Apostol	Green Hours Theatre, Bucharest
2011	Îngropați-mă pe după plintă	Bury me behind the baseboard	The mother	Pavel Sanaev	Yuri Kordonsky	Bulandra Theatre
2011	Top girls	Top Girls	Marlene	Caryl Churchill	Alexandru Berceanu	Bulandra Theatre
2011	Noi 4	4 of us	Victor	Lia Bugnar	Dorina Chiriac	Green Hours Theatre, Bucharest
2012	Moscova-Atena	Athens - Moscow and nothing	Olga	Evdokimos Tsolakidis	Adriana Zaharia	Green Hours Theatre, Bucharest
2012	Io te-am făcut, io te omor	I made you, I kill you	Flori	Bianca Andreea Lupu	Sorin Poamă & Vera Ion	Art Theatre, Bucharest
2013	Shot sau comedia relațiilor	Shot or comedy relations	Lorna, Kate, Kay and Liza	Theresa Rebeck	Andreea Bibiri	Green Hours Theatre, Bucharest
2013	Moș Crăciun e o jigodie	Santa Claus Is a Stinker	Josette	Le Splendid & Oana Tudor	Andreea Bibiri	Godot Cafe Theatre, Bucharest
2014	Cremă de zahăr ars - Astăzi îi spunem dragoste	Crème brûlée - Today we call it love	Ea (She)	Iris Spiridon	Iris Spiridon	Godot Cafe Theatre, Bucharest
2016	O femeie singură	A woman alone	Maria	Dario Fo & Franca Rame	Daniel Grigore-Simion	Art Theatre, Bucharest

== Radio theater performances ==
Year	Romanian Original Title	English Adapted title	Role	Written by	Directed by	Theatre
2004	Alb-negru sau trista poveste a prințesei din cel mai mic regat	Black and white or the sad story of the princess in the small kingdom	The princess	Irina Soare	Mihai Lungeanu	Radiophonic Theatre, Bucharest
2004	Ferma de struți	Ostrich farm		Olga Delia Mateescu	Dan Puican	Radiophonic Theatre, Bucharest
2004	Tartuffe	Tartuffe	Mariane	Molière	Ion Vova	Radiophonic Theatre, Bucharest
2004	Jurământul	The oath		Dan Tărchilă	Vasile Manta	Radiophonic Theatre, Bucharest
2005	Pelicanul	The pelican	Gerda	August Strindberg	Dan Puican	Radiophonic Theatre, Bucharest
2005	Pragul	The threshold	She	Alexandru Uiuiu	Gavril Pinte	Radiophonic Theatre, Bucharest
2006	Căsătoria	The marriage	Agafya	Nikolai Gogol	Dan Puican	Radiophonic Theatre, Bucharest
2007	Proceduri de reglementare a diferențelor	Settlement proceedings	Lina	Dimitris Dimitriadis	Cezarina Udrescu	Radiophonic Theatre, Bucharest
2008	Platonov, un Hamlet de provincie	Platonov	Sasha	Anton Chekhov	Dan Puican	Radiophonic Theatre, Bucharest
2009	Ambasadorul și ambasadoarea	Ambassador and ambassadress		Vasile Manta	Cezarina Udrescu	Radiophonic Theatre, Bucharest
2013	Iarna cărților noastre	Winter of our books	Ilinca	Ana Boariu	Ana Boariu	Radiophonic Theatre, Bucharest

== Dubbing works ==
Year	Romanian Title	English Original title	Role (Voice)
1998	Regele Leu 2: Regatul lui Simba	The Lion King II: Simba's Pride	Vitani
1999	Al treisprezecelea an	The Thirteenth Year	
2002	Regele Leu	The Lion King	Sarabi
2006	Chip și Dale	Chip 'n' Dale	Chip
2007	Shrek al treilea	Shrek the Third	Princess Fiona
2009	Clubul lui Mickey Mouse	Mickey Mouse Clubhouse	Chip
2009	Citește și plângi	Read It and Weep	
2010	Shrek pentru totdeauna	Shrek Forever After	Fiona
2010	Să râdem cu Mickey!	Have a Laugh!	Chip
2011	The Muppets	The Muppets	Mary
2011	Mămici pentru Marte	Mars Needs Moms	Ki
2012	Epoca de gheață 4: Continente în derivă	Ice Age: Continental Drift	Shira
2013	Ștrumpfii 2	The Smurfs 2	Smurfette
2015	Clopoțica și legenda bestiei de nicăieri	Tinker Bell and the Legend of the NeverBeast	Nyx

== Awards and nominations ==
- 2001 - Timica Prize at HOP Young Actors Gala
- 2002 - Nomination at UNITER Awards Best Actress for her roles in "Unchiul Vanea (Uncle Vanya)" and "Zi că-i bine! (Tell you that it's okay!)"
- 2004 - UARF Award for her role in the film "Damen Tango" granted by "The Union of Authors and Film Producers from Romania"
- 2005 - UNITER Award for Best Supporting Actress for her role in "Forma lucrurilor (The Shape of Things)"
- 2007 - UNITER Award Best Actress for her role in "Purificare (Cleansed)"
