= Sibiu International Theatre Festival =

Performing arts festival in Sibiu, Romania

The Sibiu International Theatre Festival (Romanian: Festivalul Internațional de Teatru de la Sibiu) is a theatre and performing arts festival in Sibiu, Romania, and the third biggest festival, after the Festival d'Avignon and the Edinburgh International Festival. FITS takes place in June every year and lasts for ten days. Founded in 1993 by Constantin Chiriac, the festival programme features renowned names of the international stage, offering spectators a broad range of sections, with guests from around 73 countries per edition, performing approximately 550 events.

== History ==
In March 1993, Constantin Chiriac organized the National Student Theatre Festival. The participants to this first edition of the festival represented no more than two countries (Republic of Moldova and Romania), and in 1994, the number of participating countries rose to eight, while the following two editions had guests from 21, and 24 countries, respectively. In 1994, the National Student Theatre Festival became the International Festival of Young Professional Theatre. Unlike the first three editions, in which the festival lasted for three days, the 1995 edition had a duration of four days, and for the first time proposed street performances, too. In 1997, the International Festival of Young Professional Theatre became the Sibiu International Theatre Festival (FITS), the name it still holds. Starting with the 1999 edition, it was decided that the festival would last for ten days every year. FITS played a decisive role in the city of Sibiu receiving the title European Capital of Culture 2007. Starting with the 8th edition (25 May – 3 June 2001), FITS has been organized yearly by the Radu Stanca National Theatre in Sibiu, the Sibiu City Hall and the Sibiu Local County, with the support of the Ministry of Culture, the “Lucian Blaga” University in Sibiu, the Romanian Cultural Institute, the Romanian Theatre Union, and the Sibiu County Council, and produced by the Democracy through Culture Foundation.

== Slogans ==
From the 1995 edition on, each year, FITS has unfolded under the sign of a slogan:

- 1995 - Tolerance
- 1996 - Violence
- 1997 - Cultural Identity
- 1998 - Links
- 1999 - Creativity
- 2000 - Alternative
- 2001 - Challenges
- 2002 - Bridges
- 2003 - Tomorrow
- 2004 - Legacies
- 2005 - Signs
- 2006 - Together ?!
- 2007 - Next
- 2008 - Energy
- 2009 - Innovations
- 2010 - Questions
- 2011 - Community
- 2012 - Crisis. Culture makes a difference
- 2013 - Dialogue
- 2014 - Uniqueness in diversity
- 2015 - Growing Smart - Smart Growing
- 2016 - Building trust
- 2017 - Love
- 2018 - Passion
- 2019 - The art of giving
- 2020 - Empowered
- 2021 - Building hope together
- 2022 - Beauty
- 2023 - Wonder
- 2024 - Friendship

== Sections ==
=== Theatre ===
From the very first edition of the festival, Sibiu saw the presence of some of the most representative international theatre companies, directors, actors, scenographers, which led to a transformation not only in terms of the community's openness to other mentalities, worlds, and cultures, but also to a professionalization of the Romanian performing arts artists and students invited to Sibiu to perform and participate at workshops, conferences, etc.

Throughout its 27 editions, the festival has presented over 1,500 indoor performances (theatre, dance, circus, music, opera, musicals, concerts), of which more than 1,000 theatre shows.

Many directors have contributed to the notoriety of the festival: Rimas Tuminas, Andriy Zholdak, Hanoch Levin, Lev Erenburg, Eugenio Barba, Yuri Kordonsky, Pippo Delbono, Eimuntas Nekrošius, Masahiro Yasuda, Levan Tsuladze, Lars Norén, Peter Brook, Armin Petras, Joël Pommerat, Declan Donnellan, Hideki Noda (playwright), Ivan Vyrypaev, Peter Stein, Wajdi Mouawad, Krystian Lupa, Lev Dodin, Angélica Liddell, Emmanuel Demarcy-Mota, Data Tavadze, Kazuyoshi Kushida, Yoshi Oida, Monika Strzępka, Christoph Marthaler, Thomas Ostermeier, Luk Perceval, Jarosław Fret, Alvis Hermanis, Tim Robbins, Tang Shu-wing, Philippe Genty, Akihiro Yamamoto, Jernej Lorenci, Robert Wilson (director), Eric Lacascade, Lisa Peterson, Eirik Stubø, Timofey Kulyabin, and many more.

Romanian directors have participated at the festival every year, throughout various editions: Silviu Purcărete, Victor Ioan Frunză, Cătălina Buzoianu, David Esrig, Alexandru Dabija, Mihai Măniuțiu, Răzvan Mazilu, Alexandru Darie, Alexander Hausvater, Miriam Răducanu, Radu Beligan, Chris Simion, Felix Alexa, Gábor Tompa, Anca Bradu, Alexandra Badea, Radu Afrim, Florin Piersic Jr., Radu Alexandru Nica, Gavriil Pinte, Vlad Massaci, Cristi Juncu, Andrei Șerban, Theodor Cristian Popescu, Lia Bugnar, Ada Milea, Bobi Pricop, Bogdan Georgescu, Eugen Jebeleanu, Gigi Căciuleanu, Andrei and Andreea Grosu, Eugen Gyemant, Cătălin Ștefănescu, Radu Jude, Vlad Cristache, Botond Nagy, Nona Ciobanu.

=== Dance ===
Although the name of FITS still includes the word “theatre”, from the first editions, it has become a true performing arts festival. The need to bring the audience not only new forms of theatre, but also other art forms, determined the organizers to invite several types of dance performances – contemporary, traditional (flamenco, kathak, kabuki, butoh, noh, dervish, African, Balinese), hip-hop, flexing, etc.

Multiple contemporary or traditional dance choreographers have left their mark on the history of the festival: Karine Ponties, Amir Kolben, Gigi Căciuleanu, Adi Sha'al, Nicole Mossoux, Patrick Bonté, Lia Rodrigues, Marie Chouinard, Noa Wertheim, Răzvan Mazilu, Thierry Smits, Barak Marshall, Inbal Pinto and Avshalom Pollak Dance Company, Sasha Waltz, Alain Buffard, Paco Peña, Rocío Molina, Olivier Dubois, Ohad Naharin, María Pagés, Jesus Carmona, Brenda Angiel, Ziya Azazi, Jin Xing, Linda Kapetanea, Aditi Mangaldas, Yamamoto Akihiro, Damien Jalet, Hervé Koubi, Reggie (Regg Roc) Gray, Peter Sellers, Gregory Maqoma, Itzik Galili, Eun-Me Ahn, Michèle Noiret, Luca Silvestrini.

=== Circus and contemporary circus ===
Ever since the first editions, the festival programme comprised outdoor and indoor circus shows, which enjoyed great success. Some of the best-known companies invited to Sibiu are Cirque Baroque, Les Lendemains – from France, Les Parfaits Inconnus, Les 7 Doigts de la Main and Machine de Cirque – from Canada, Circa (contemporary circus) and Gravity and Other Myths, Strut & Fret Production House – from Australia, Lady Cocktail and Cie Carré Curieux, Cirque Vivant! – from Belgium, Compagnia Finzi Pasca, Martin Zimmerman, Compagnia Baccalà and David Dimitri – from Switzerland, Kallo Collective from Finland, Lurrak – from France.

=== Musical ===
FITS has hosted several musical performances, signed both by international directors (Pierre Notte), and by directors from Romania or originating from Romania (Răzvan Mazilu and Cosmin Chivu).

=== Opera ===
The companies that have made up the FITS programme over the years include: Yue Opera from China, Hangzhou Yue Opera Theatre and Shaoxing City Performance CO., or Vuyani Dance Theatre from South Africa.

=== Music ===
Over the 25 editions of FITS, outdoor music concerts, especially those presented in Sibiu's Big Square or Small Square, have brought together the biggest number of non-paying spectators. Some of the national and international artists that have performed on the festival stage are: Misia, Mamselle Ruiz, Vama (band), Holograf, Delia & Band, Imperial Kikiristan, Șuie Paparude, Vunk, Loredana Groza, Smiley (singer), the Brass Band from Cozmești, Voltaj, Vama Veche (band), Iris (Romanian band), Zdob și Zdub, Direcția 5, Cargo, Țapinarii, Irina Sârbu & Trio Puiu Pascu, Antract, Grupul Iza, Klaus Obermaier & Chris Haring, Phoenix (band), Tudor Gheorghe, Professional Folk Ensemble “Cindrelul - Junii Sibiului”, Monica Anghel, Robin and the Backstabbers, Otros Aires, Shukar Collective.

In time, the music and concert section of FITS focused more and more on other genres (fado, gospel, jazz, organ concerts) and new band and artist names, such as Kadebostany, De Staat, KillAson, Youngr, Adrian Naidin, Urma (band), Superorganism (band) etc.

=== Concerts in churches and historical sites ===
Through the editions of FITS, the churches in Sibiu and in the surrounding area (Mărginimea Sibiului) have hosted a series of fado, gospel, organ, opera and other types of concerts, held by Romanian and international artists and bands, such as Weinberger Blues Machine, Isabelle Roy, Felix Dima Quarteto, Celina Ramsauer, Max Vandervorst, Cantabile, André Mergenthaler, Ursula Philippi, Orchestra Bibescu, Marius Mihalache, Matthias Anton Quartett, Mariachi Figueroa, Kleztory, Mandinga, Stockholm Lisboa Project, Shaun Davey, Ensemble Renaissance, Grigore Leșe, Francesco Agnello, Grupul Vocal Acapella, IDMC Gospel Choir, Compagnie Lyrique Corse, Llarena “Michito”, Cantabile – The London Quartet, The Mystery of Bulgarian Voices, Maria Berasarte, Sanda Weigl, Howard Gospel Choir, Group TAGO & AtoBIZ Ltd., Kurrende Choir from Tübingen & Sibiu State Philharmonics Orchestra & the Sibiu Bach Choir, SoNoRo, Fado Violado, Ana Sofia Varela, Adrian Naidin Quartet, Jorge Da Rocha, Cristiano de Sousa, Liviu Holender, Fiona Pollak Parvathy Baul. From the 24th edition (9-18 June 2017), the FITS programme also extended to Transylvanian fortified churches, thus adding a new dimension to the festival, by exploiting the Romanian cultural heritage and raising the profile of renovated Transylvanian organs. Church choirs and artists, like Amalia Goje, Noémi Miklós, Jürg Leutert, Erich Türk, Ursula Philippi, Roxana Bârsan, Capella Coronensis & the Black Church Bach Choir, played organ concerts for the communities around Sibiu, in the Evangelical churches in Cisnădie, Gușterița, Cisnădioara, Slimnic, Roșia and in the Criț Fortified Church.

=== Street performances ===
For a quarter of a century, more than 500 street companies have performed in various outdoor spaces in Sibiu. Among the most important names are Teatr Osmego Dnia, Biuro Podróży, Neighbourhood Watch Stilts International, DAH Teater, Teatrul Masca, the Brass Band from Cozmești, Abracadabra Foundation, Osadia, Aktionstheater Pan.Optikum, Generik Vapeur, Compagnie Transe Express, Faber Teater, Compagnie Malabar, Compagnie Carabosse, Compagnie Opposito, Xarxa, Les Goulus, Plasticiens Volants, Aérosculpture, Teatr KTO, Ljud Company, La Salamandre, Carros de Foc, Bash Street Theatre, Sarruga Produccions, International Show Parade, Close-Act Theatre, Bilbobasso, Theater Titanick, David Dimitri, Cirq'ulation Locale, Cie. Faï, Kitonb Project, AAINJAA, Cie. Woest, Muare Experience & Duchamp Pilot, Cie Remue Ménage, Teatro tascabile di Bergamo, Planète Vapeur, Geschwister Weisheit, Teatro dei Venti, Architects of Air.

=== Heritage performances ===
Heritage performances created by the “Radu Stanca” National Theatre, the main organizer of FITS, have a special place in the programme of theatre shows. These performances created in Sibiu throughout the years have been highly appreciated by national and international audiences, as part of them have been included in each edition of FITS: “Metamorphoses”, “Faust”, “Waiting for Godot”, “The Scarlet Princess” (directed by Silviu Purcărete), “A Streetcar Named Popescu” and “The Cioran Temptation” (directed by Gavriil Pinte).

=== Aplauze Magazine ===
The Festival, in collaboration with professors and students from the Schools of Letters and Theatre Studies within the “Lucian Blaga” University of Sibiu, the “Babeș-Bolyai” University of Cluj-Napoca and the Bucharest National University of Theatre and Film, as well as students from universities outside Romania, print the Aplauze Magazine every day of each edition of FITS. At the beginning, the publication was coordinated by Doru Moțoc, and starting 2005, by Ion M. Tomuș. This magazine aims to function as a performing arts review laboratory (performance reviews, interviews, cultural journal, event reports, presentations), to contribute to the festival's artistic dialogue platform, and to strengthen the celebratory atmosphere in the community of Sibiu.

Aplauze Magazine is distributed free of charge in several festival venues, from the ticketing agency to the Sibiu Tourist Information Centre. It is also available for viewing and downloading on the festival website.

=== Special events ===
Every year, FITS disseminates artistic creation through the special events it schedules and which can be accessed by the general audience free of charge. The audience thus have the opportunity to develop formally and informally by attending conferences and seminars, book launches, talks around performances, play-readings, and films, as well as around the International Platform of Doctoral Research in the Fields of Performing Arts and Cultural Management.

==== Conferences and seminars ====
The artists who come to FITS are invited to have talks with performing arts critics and experts on the role of their art and the meaning of performing arts and cultural management in society. Since 2004, Octavian Saiu has been the chair of the conference series. Throughout the festival history, several figures of the Romanian and international stage have talked to the festival audiences: Jonathan Mills, Pawel Potoroczyn, Mircea Dinescu, Sorin Alexandrescu, Jan Klata, Krystian Lupa, Neil LaBute, Peter Stein, Pippo Delbono, Wajdi Mouawad, Roman Dolzhansky, Tim Robbins, Eugenio Barba, Yevgeny Mironov, Jaroslaw Fret, Luk Perceval, Thomas Ostermeier, Vincent Baudriller, Irina Margareta Nistor, Ioan Holender, Akihiro Yamamoto, Christophe Sermet, Marcel Iureș, Rimas Tuminas, Robert Wilson, Vasile Șirli, Ada Solomon, David Baile, Ohad Naharin, Radu Jude, Alexandru Dabija, Tang Shu Wing, Cristian Mungiu, Isabelle Huppert, Eugenio Barba, Nicola Savarese, Ioan-Aurel Pop, Jean-Michel Ribes, Sever Voinescu, Denis O'Hare, Stan Lai.

==== Book launches ====
For 27 years, the FITS collection has launched over 50 publications, including studies, essays, albums, and anthologies on artists, performing arts history, arts, management, contemporary theatre plays, marketing and cultural management, etc. As part of the studies and essays, the festival has published a series of books by authors such as: George Banu, Eugenio Barba, Augusto Boal, Luc Bondy, Michael Chekhov, John Russell Brown, Marina Davydova, Pippo Delbono, Maria M. Delgado, Nikolai Mihailovici Gorceakov, Thomas Ostermeier, Iulia Popovici, Olivier Py, Cristian Radu, Dan Rebellato, Nicola Savarese, Bruno Tackels, Matei Vișniec, Noel Witts. On the occasion of the 10th, 15th, 20th, and 25th anniversaries of FITS, the festival published photo albums with pictures of representative performances presented over the course of its history; moreover, in 2008, the “Faust” album was published, with photographs by Mihaela Marin. Every year starting 1996, FITS has also published an anthology of texts on the theme of each edition.

==== Play-readings and radiophonic theatre ====
Since the 1997 edition, FITS has also been editing the Anthology of plays presented in the Play-Reading section. Contemporary plays by Romanian and international playwrights are published in both an international language, and Romanian. Most of these plays are presented as play-readings or even full-fledged performances. At the end of each play-reading, spectators and listeners of Radio România Cultural can talk to the moderator of this section, Cătălin Ștefănescu, as well as the actors, directors, authors, and translators of these plays.

==== Film ====
The film section has been established for a better dissemination of the works of the artists no longer active in performing arts, such as Jerzy Grotowski, Tadeusz Kantor or Liviu Ciulei, as well as to discover, through documentaries, the works and lives of directors and choreographers who left a mark on the contemporary destiny of performing arts, such as Peter Brook, Ariane Mnouchkine, Pippo Delbono, Robert Wilson, Ohad Naharin. Many artists present in the festival, whose careers touch on the world of film, have been in dialogue with the audience, before or after the festival showed films directed, written, adapted after their plays or in which they perform. They include: Silviu Purcărete (“Somewhere in Palilula”), Jan Lauwers (“Goldfish”), Ivan Vyrypaev (“Delhi Dance”), Alexa Visarion (“Ana”), Wajdi Mouawad (“Incendies”), Neil LaBute (“Some Velvet Morning”), Pippo Delbono (“Amore e carne”, “Vangelo”), Radu Jude (“Aferim!”, “Scarred Hearts”), Olivier Py (“Mediteranées”), Klaus Maria Brandauer (“Mephisto”), Emmanuel Demarcy-Mota (“The Rhinoceros”), Yoshi Oida (“Have You Seen the Moon?”), Victor Rebengiuc (“Moromeții”), Tim Robbins (“The Shawshank Redemption”), Mikhail Baryshnikov (“White Nights”), Marcel Iureș (“The Phantom Father”), Isabelle Huppert (“Elle”), Eugenio Barba (“The Art of the Impossible”).

==== Specialized workshops ====
Part of the non-formal training and formal education offered by FITS comes from the possibility to take part in the festival's specialized workshops. These workshops focus on dramatic writing methods (Paul Godfrey, Neil LaBute), commedia dell'arte (Dean Gilmour), noh and kabuki theatre (Fujita Asaya, Yasuda Masahiro), movement and pantomime (Stichting Clown & Comedie), directing (Irina Solomon), scenography (Dragoș Buhagiar), choreography, improvisations Ezzeddine Gannoun), voice and speaking (Janet B. Rodgers, Thom Jones), integrated voice (Liz Eckert), devising theatre (Benjamin May), mask technique, adapting a space to the present-day theatrical process (Jean Guy-Lecat), theatre criticism (Ilinca Todoruț, Alexandra Pâzgu), solving movement in the stage space (Gelabert Azzopardi, Aditi Mangaldas, Amir Kolben, Nelson Fernandez), creating a one-man show (Adam Lazarus), Meyerhold's biomechanics (Elena Kuzina), Argentinian tango (Eugenia Usandivara and Leo Calvelli), unconventional acting (Kym Moore), Stanislavskian theatre (Andreas Manolikakis), Michael Chekhov's character development method (Elena Kuzina), backstage of fiction (Eugenio Barba), principles of the Japanese noh classic theatre (Akihiro Yamamoto).

During the 2017 edition, in collaboration with the LBUS Department of Drama and Theatre Studies and The Market, an architecture workshop entitled “Simplicity is Very Sophisticated” was organized, coordinated by scenographer Jean-Guy Lecat.

==== Exhibitions and the visual art platform ====
As with the film and documentary section, certain performing arts artists (such as Roswitha Hecke, Tadeusz Kantor, Jerzy Grotowski, Doina Levintza, Dragoș Buhagiar, Lia Manțoc, Silviu Purcărete, Radu Afrim, Kazuyoshi Kushida, Nic Ularu) are also present through exhibitions of photography, set design elements and so on. Moreover, we organize exhibitions by local, national, and international plastic artists, such as Roswitha Hecke, Elke Traue, Mihai Tymoshenko, Neculai Păduraru, Krzysztof Dydo, Lina Herschel, Lucien Samaha, Marcel Chirnoagă, Ștefan Câlția, Ulyana Tymoshenko, Asghar Khatibzadeh, H.R. Giger. In 2013, FITS and the “Radu Stanca” National Theatre proposed that artist Dan Perjovschi created and coordinated a Vertical Newspaper on the wall of the national theatre, which has reached the sixth edition. On the occasion of the 25th anniversary of the festival and of the Centenary of modern Romania, Dan Perjovschi, the “Radu Stanca” National Theatre and FITS continued this collaboration through an artistic installation made of magnets.

==== Book fair ====
Ever since the 2012 edition, FITS, in collaboration with the Sibiu Chamber of Commerce, Industry and Agriculture, has organized a book fair in Sibiu, in which relevant publishers in Romania present over 4,000 books per edition.

== Associated structures ==
=== Sibiu Walk of Fame ===
In 2013, the management of FITS and of the “Radu Stanca” National Theatre proposed to the City Hall and the Sibiu Local Council the creation of a Walk of Fame in Cetății Park, an alley located between the oldest theatre in Romania (Thalia Hall in Sibiu) and the “Radu Stanca” National Theatre in Sibiu. The first figures to receive a star during the 20th edition (7 16 June 2013) were Ariane Mnouchkine, Declan Donnellan, Eugenio Barba, Silviu Purcărete, George Banu, Nakamura Kanzaburō XVIII. In the next editions (2014, 2015, 2016, 2017, 2018, and 2019), they were followed by: Lev Dodin, Peter Brook, Peter Stein, Krystian Lupa, Gigi Căciuleanu, Radu Stanca, Martin Hochmeister, Eimuntas Nekrošius, Joël Pommerat, Kazuyoshi Kushida, Klaus Maria Brandauer, Neil LaBute, Tim Robbins, Alvis Hermanis, Christoph Marthaler, Yevgeny Mironov, Luk Perceval, Victor Rebengiuc, Thomas Ostermeier, Philippe Genty, Rimas Tuminas, Ohad Naharin, Vasile Șirli, Marcel Iureș, Robert Wilson, Peter Sellers, Hideki Noda, Wajdi Mouawad, Ioan Holender, Mikhail Baryshnikov, Isabelle Huppert, Emmanuel Demarcy-Mota, Maia Morgenstern, Michael Thalheimer, Pippo Delbono, Sidi Larbi Cherkaoui, and Stan Lai. The event takes place in Cetății Park, on the penultimate day of the festival; the unveiling ceremony on the Walk of Fame is followed by the Celebrity Gala, during which models of the stars on the Walk of Fame are awarded, alongside special prizes, such as the Virgil Flonda Prize for exceptional contribution to performing arts, and the Iulian Vișa Prize dedicated to artists of the new generation.

=== Sibiu Performing Arts Market ===
Sibiu Performing Arts Market is a structure associated to FITS, that aims to offer a chance to all artists, cultural operators, performing arts institutions or cultural networks to meet relevant world producers. Since the first edition organized in 1997, the Sibiu Performing Arts Market developed into a cultural network connecting festivals and artists, independent companies or state institutions in the field of performing arts. Every year, more than 300 participants all over the world, representing various cultural organizations (arts management agencies, NGOs, public institutions, independent companies, etc.), meet in Sibiu to establish connections and start possible future partnerships.

The special events organized in the framework of The Market, topical subjects of cultural sectors and creative industries are discussed, while also presenting opportunities for collaboration. The workshops place an accent on sharing experiences and continuous learning. Alongside the new events specific to each edition and adapted to national and international cultural realities, the programme also includes the successful conferences, workshops and meetings of the previous editions, as well as the seminar dedicated to festival management.

=== The Volunteer Programme ===
The FITS Volunteer Programme is perhaps the biggest educational programme based on selection, volunteering, and training in the field of performing arts and cultural management. Each year, about 500 volunteers from all over the world, trained and distributed according to their personal and professional preferences, are involved in the organization and unfolding of FITS. Besides the local and national volunteer selection, every year, the Volunteer Programme also includes international volunteers. This international endeavour began in 2005, thus creating a community of over 200 volunteers from countries such as: Bulgaria, Canada, South Korea, Iran, Japan, France, Georgia, Germany, Indonesia, Mexico, Russia, Singapore, Turkey, and Hungary. To recruit them, FITS collaborates with a series of partners, such as European Capitals of Culture or Eu-Japan Fest. Through the latter, over the ten years of partnership, more than 130 Japanese youngsters have come to Sibiu and contributed to the organization of the festival.

=== Therme Forum – Theatre and Architecture ===
Since the 25th anniversary edition (8-17 June 2018), the FITS organizers thought it useful to set up a section dedicated to a forum on the needs of the community and of the built and urban environment in relation to the new requirements of the world of performing arts. For three days, representatives of important performing arts international institutions (Joe Melillo – Brooklyn Academy of Arts, Andrzej Kosendiak – National Forum of Music, Annette Mees – Royal Opera House Covent Garden, Constantin Chiriac – FITS), as well as world-class architects (Nils Fischer – Zaha Hadid Architects, Andrew Bromberg – Aedas International, Maximilian and Daniel Zielinski – Foster and Partners, Jean-Guy Lecat – Studio JG Lecat, Kengo Kuma – Kuma and Associates, Louis Becker – Henning Larsen, Eric Bunge – nArchitects, Jason Flanagan – Flanagan Lawrence I Architects), discussed the theatre experience of the future from the perspective of architecture, programming, technology, and the evolution of the communities. At the same time, the topics approached were aimed at disseminating the role of iconic architecture, of brand identity in relation to the community, of the future influencing the flexibility, the permeability and the relationship to the community, as well as the role of the built environment in shaping visitor experience.

=== International Platform of Doctoral Research in the Fields of Performing Arts and Cultural Management ===
Before the beginning of the 2015-2016 university year, when the Performing Arts and Cultural Management Doctoral School was established, as part of its 22nd edition (12-21 June 2015), alongside the Department of Drama and Theatre Studies at the “Lucian Blaga” University, FITS organized the first Platform of Doctoral Research in Romania. Since the 2017 edition, the platform has been scheduled two days before the beginning of each edition of the festival, is chaired by Professor Octavian Saiu, and is organized by the Drama and Arts Management Universities Convention. This platform's main objective is to promote, through the festival and by presenting the best doctoral papers in performing arts, an inter-institutional collaboration with the 19 partner universities in Europe, Asia, the United States of America (University of Sorbonne Nouvelle Paris 3 in France, Brown University, Suffolk Community College and Pace University of the United States of America, Japan Women's University, Nagoya City University, Nihon University and Waseda University in Japan, Leeds Beckett University and York St. John University in the United Kingdom, Folkwang University of the Arts in Germany, National Theatre School of Canada and Université de Moncton in Canada, Central Academy of Drama, Education University of Hong Kong, Beijing Dance Academy and Shanghai Theatre Academy in China, Moscow State University of Culture and Arts in Russia and the Academy of Music, Theatre and Fine Arts in Chișinău, Republic of Moldova).

=== The Drama and Arts Management Universities Convention ===
The section entitled Meeting of Theatre Schools and Academies, which, in 2017, became the Drama and Arts Management Universities Convention, was created in 1996, the same year as the play-reading section. Over time, relevant theatre universities and schools in Romania and abroad have taken part in it, such as: “Lucian Blaga” University of Sibiu, Pace University in New York, Freiburger Schauspielschule, the Central Academy of Drama in Beijing, the Academy of Arts, Leeds Beckett University, “Babeș-Bolyai” University, the Academy of Arts in Osijek, the Aleksander Zelwerowicz National Academy of Dramatic Art in Warsaw, Janáček Academy of Music and Performing Arts, Bucharest National University of Theatre and Film “I.L. Caragiale”, Târgu Mureș Arts University. Just like the Sibiu Performing Arts Market became a structure associated to FITS, due to the need to be connected to contemporary performing arts, the events in the section dedicated to students and pupils had to be organized as part of an independent structure associated to the festival. The aim is that, after 25 years in which over 150 student performances were organized by FITS, those responsible for this section, alongside the management and the teaching staff of the “Lucian Blaga” University of Sibiu, create their own identity, by presenting student performances and organizing workshops, conferences and the Platform of Doctoral Research in the Fields of Performing Arts and Cultural Management dedicated to students and professors.

This Drama and Arts Management Convention allowed Romanian and international universities that include schools or departments of performing arts (theatre, dance, choreography, directing, etc.), theatre studies and cultural management to send dozens of students to Sibiu year after year to represent their universities through performances, but most especially to have the chance to take part in active training, by seeing high quality shows from the six continents (Europe, Asia, North America, South America, Africa, Australia) free of charge, volunteering, being involved in workshops, conferences, seminars.

== Popularity ==
According to the figures related to the 2019 edition, FITS brought together about 3,300 artists from 73 countries, who presented over 500 events in 75 venues (conventional spaces, like performance halls, university halls, as well as unconventional settings, such as churches, book shops, fortified churches, former factories, high school, cafes, pubs, pedestrian areas, squares, parks, parking lots, and hotels), reaching an audience of over 68,000 spectators per day.

== 2020 Edition ==
Because of the restrictions imposed in the context of the COVID-19 pandemic, FITS had to redesign its format altogether, to avoid having to make the choice shared by other big similar festivals, which had to suspend the editions planned for 2020. By taking advantage of the recent rise of the virtual environment which has contributed to the dissemination of performing arts products, the management of FITS decided for this year's edition, themed “Puterea de a crede / Empowered”, to take place exclusively online. Thus, in 12–21 June 2020, the FITS programme offered worldwide audiences free access to digital performances and conferences by renowned creators. Some of the highlights of the 2020 edition included: “Brothers and Sisters”, directed by Lev Dodin, “After the Battle”, directed by Pippo Delbono, “Masquerade”, directed by Rimas Tuminas, “Three Sisters”, directed by Peter Stein, “Measure for Measure”, directed by Declan Donnellan, “Messiah”, directed by Robert Wilson, “Körper”, choreography by Sasha Waltz, “Alone in Berlin”, directed by Luk Perceval, “Richard III”, directed by Silviu Purcărete, “White Noise”, choreography by Noa Wertheim, “Characters”, directed by Hideki Noda, “Miss Julie”, directed by Thomas Ostermeier, “Dunes”, choreography by María Pagés and Sidi Larbi Cherkaoui.
