= Milchik (disambiguation) =

Milchik, michig or milkhik is an Ashkenazi Jewish dairy-based category of food.

Milchik may also refer to:

- Mikhail Milchik (born 1934), Soviet and Russian art historian
- Milchik, the narrator in the novel On Venus, Have We Got a Rabbi! by William Tenn
- Seth Milchick, a main character in the American TV series Severance
