= Lakhia =

Lakhia is an Indian surname. Notable people with the surname include:

- Apoorva Lakhia, Indian film director
- Kumudini Lakhia (born 1930), Indian Kathak dancer and choreographer
- Aditya Lakhia, Indian actor
