= Kitić =

Kitić (Serbian Cyrillic Китић) is a Serbian and Bosnian family name

- Mile Kitić (1952), Serbian folk singer
- Aleksandar Kitić (1983), Bosnian footballer
- Svetlana Dašić-Kitić (1960) Bosnian handball player
- Milena Kitić, Serbia-born, naturalized American opera singer
