= Gong Theatre =

The Gong Theatre is a children's theatre in Sibiu, Romania. It is one of the oldest in the country.

== History ==
Opened in 1949, the theatre quickly became one of the leading establishments of performing arts for children and young people. During the communist era, the allowed plays that could take place were very restricted. Only after the fall of communism in 1989, with the political changes that took place, the theatre expanded its permanent repertoire to house over 88 shows ranging from live performances and puppet theatre.

During the 2007 Sibiu European Cultural Capital, the theatre became more involved in the organizing of events for Sibiu International Theatre Festival, hosting shows for children and also for adults.
