= Kemal Başar =

Turkish theatre director and actor

- Born: 25 October 1963 (age 62); Ankara, Turkey
- Occupations: Director; drama teacher; translator
- Spouse: Lale Başar
- Children: Savaş Alp Başar
- Father: Savaş Başar

Kemal Başar (born 25 October 1963) is a Turkish theatre director, drama teacher and translator. He finished MSU State Conservatory Theatre Section in 1989 and joined Turkish State Theatres in the same year. He was the artistic director of Ankara State Theatre and founder and manager of Turkish State Theatres International Affairs Office.

He is well known in his country as the curator of international theatre festivals. He also holds seminars and workshops abroad, especially in Romania and Poland.

== Plays directed ==
- Nothing / Evdokimos Tsolakidis / Sadri Alisik Theatre, Istanbul, Turkey
- Hamlet / William Shakespeare / Cef Tiyatro, Istanbul, Turkey
- Istanbul Efendisi / Musahipzade Celal / Sivas State Theatre, Turkey
- An American Man In Harput / Cevat Fehmi Başkut / Istanbul Municipality, Turkey
- Accidental Death of an Anarchist / Dario Fo / Teatrul de Arta Deva, Romania
- Paci / Burak Akyuz / Istanbul People's Theatre, Turkey
- Külhanbeyi Muzikali / Ulku Ayvaz / Bakirkoy Municipality Theatre, Turkey
- Avalanche / Tuncer Cucenoglu / İstanbul Municipality Theatre, Turkey
- Romeo and Juliet / William Shakespeare / İstanbul Municipality Theatre, Turkey
- Loving Hurrem / Can Atilla / Teatr Modjeska, Poland
- Dormitory Nr. 72 / Orhan Kemal / Sadri Alisik Theatre, İstanbul, Turkey
- Romeo and Juliet / William Shakespeare / Teatrul Tony Bulandra, Romania
- Romeo and Juliet / William Shakespeare / Van State Theatre, Turkey
- Time Of Your Life / William Saroyan / Ankara State Theatre, Turkey
- The Child Behind The Eyes / Nava Semel / Teatrul G.A. Petculescu, Romania
- The Child Behind The Eyes / Nava Semel / Ankara State Theatre, Turkey
- Good Luck / Okday Korunan / Yalniztiyatro, Turkey
- Nemrut / Gulsah Banda / Antalya State Theatre, Turkey
- Red River / Tuncer Cucenoglu / Adana State Theatre, Turkey
- Step Ballad / Unal Akpinar / Women Players, Turkey
- The Bear In My Garden / Refik Erduran / Ankara State Theatre, Turkey
- Nalinlar / Necati Cumali / Konya State Theatre, Turkey
- Cactus Flower / Barillet and Gredy / Konya State Theatre, Turkey
- Memets of Karalar / Cahit Atay / Sivas State Theatre, Turkey
- Persians / Aeschylus / Bursa AVP Youth Theatre, Turkey
- Three Tall Women / Edward Albee / Ankara State Theatre, Turkey

== Translated plays ==
- Requiem / Hanoch Levin
- Messiah / Martin Sherman
- Screwed / Zadok Zemach
- Her Leaves / Andreas Flourakis
- Aliens With Extraordinary Skills / Saviana Stănescu
- Nothing / Evdokimos Tsolakidis

== Filmography ==
- Aşkın Yolculuğu: Hacı Bayram Veli 2021
- Menajerimi Ara 2021 / Episode 35
- Dayı (film) 2020
- Son Şaka (film) 2020
- Mucize Doktor 2020
- Naim Cep Herkülü (film) 2019
- Eşkıya Dünyaya Hükümdar Olmaz 2016–2018
- Göl Zamanı (film) 2012
- 72. Koğuş (film) 2010
- Signora Enrica (film) 2010
- Kurtlar Vadisi Pusu 2009 / Episodes 52–58
- Kod Adı Kaos 2006
- Kod Adı 2006
- Samyeli 2000
- Ah Bir Büyümesek 1995
- Yukarı Karakısık 1994

=== As voice actor ===
- Sihirli Annem 2021 (Taci)
