= Octavian Saiu =

Scholar and theatre critic

- Born: 1977 (age 48–49)
- Education: PhD
- Occupations: Professor, Theatre critic
- Writing career
- Notable awards: The Critics' Award 2010 The Award of the Union of Theatre Artists (UNITER) 2013 Knight of the Order of Cultural Merit, awarded by the President of Romania, 2020 The Honorary Award of The Ministry of Culture of Romania, 2024

Octavian Saiu (born 1977) is a Romanian scholar and theatre critic.

== Education ==
Octavian Saiu received his PhD in Theatre Studies from National University of Theatre and Film (NUTF) in Romania and completed another PhD in Comparative Literature at the University of Otago in New Zealand. His Romanian doctoral thesis focused on the concept of theatrical space; the New Zealand one analysed the European reception of the theatre of the absurd. He was a Post-Doctoral Fellow in the English Department of the University of Otago, and has received his Habilitation in Theatre and Performing Arts.

== Career ==
Saiu is a teacher in the Postgraduate Programme of NUTF and a PhD supervisor in the Doctoral School of "Lucian Blaga" University of Sibiu. He was a visiting fellow at the Institute of Germanic and Romance Studies, School of Advanced Study – University of London, and has been visiting professor at various universities in Europe and Asia, as well as the Grotowski Institute.

He chaired sessions in the "Talks and Workshops Series" of Edinburgh International Festival and has been the Chair of the Conferences of Sibiu International Theatre Festival since 2004. Since 2014 he has been the Chair of the Shakespeare Studies Conference in the context of the biennial Craiova International Shakespeare Festival.

He is a collaborator of Wuzhen Theatre Festival and a Founding Member of the International Theatre Town Alliance in Shengzhou.

Saiu was Adjunct Secretary General of the International Association of Theatre Critics (IATC) and President of the Romanian Section – Theatre Studies of IATC. He has authored eleven books on theatre, as well as numerous refereed and nonrefereed journal articles. He is the recipient of the Critics' Award (2010) and the Award of the Union of Theatre Artists (UNITER) in 2013.

One of Saiu's constant activities involves public talks and dialogues. In 2019 in Hong Kong, he spoke about the global perception of Chinese culture, beyond the usual clichés of commodification and cultural diplomacy. One of the recurrent themes in Saiu's talks is performative space, a notion he links with the idea of creative energy. As affirmed in his book on this topic, Saiu considers Hamlet a character whose madness is not merely feigned, but real. As a promoter of critical thinking in theatre and performing arts, he organised a keynote panel in the context of the ASSITEJ congress in Cape Town on the values of criticism and value judgment in children's theatre. More recently, he spoke about the role of critical thinking in theatre pedagogy during a plenary address at the Conference of the ITI/UNESCO Network for Higher Education in the Performing Arts (2018). At the Academy of Arts in Berlin, as invited speaker at a conference organized to celebrate Hans-Thies Lehmann's Postdramatic Theatre, he spoke about the dangers of employing cultural concepts as "umbrella terms" for contemporary theatre, with specific reference to the title of Lehmann's seminal essay.

Throughout the years, he has hosted cultural conversations with Tim Robbins, John Malkovich, Mikhail Baryshnikov, Bill Murray, Kathleen Turner, Wole Soyinka, Jin Xing, Neil LaBute, Eric-Emmanuel Schmitt, Ohad Naharin, Jaroslaw Fret, Mao Weitao, Laetitia Casta, Stan Lai, Stanley Wells, Robert Lepage, Robert Wilson, Sasha Waltz, Anne Teresa de Keersmaeker, Thomas Ostermeier, Ivo Van Hove, Jan Fabre, Declan Donnellan, Akram Khan, Israel Galvan, Andrei Serban and many others.

On the occasion of the Day of the National Culture, the 15th of January 2020, the President of Romania awarded him the title, Knight of the Order of Cultural Merit. The distinction was offered "as a sign of appreciation for his important activity dedicated to theatre criticism, and for the professionalism that he has shown in promoting Romanian theatrical creation".

In 2024, Saiu received The Honorary Award of The Ministry of Culture of Romania as a sign of recognition for his transformative role in theatre leadership, as well as for his “extraordinary contribution to promoting the art of dialogue between artists, performing arts professionals and audiences alike”. This distinction marked his 20 years as the host of the Dialogues of the Sibiu International Theatre Festival - [FITS].

During the pandemic, Saiu was very active as a conference chair and public speaker, promoting the idea that "theatre is not a commodity, but a cultural necessity". He held events in both English and Romanian: talks, conferences and dialogues with artists and scholars for his Bucharest seasonal series, for Sibiu International Theatre Festival, for International Theatre Institute (ITI-UNESCO), for Tokyo Festival, for IATC Hong Kong etc. After a conversation with the leaders of International Theatre Institute (ITI-UNESCO), ASSITEJ, and UNIMA, he launched the Manifesto for Theatre and Performing Arts. As the chair of the international conference 'This and That and That: the Multiple Roles of the Theatre Artist – the Double Meaning of Performative Criticism', he was described by Jason Hale as "one [of] the greatest connectors in the world of theatre".

In July 2022, Saiu founded the International Association of Theatre Leaders [IATL], an entity that gathers some of the most prominent figures from the field of performing arts with a proven leadership track record:

== Books ==
- Phèdre. D'Euripide à Racine, de Sénèque à Sarah Kane [Phaedra: from Euripides to Racine, from Seneca to Sarah Kane] (Bruxelles: Lansman Editeur), 2022, ISBN 978-2-8071-0353-5
- Arta de a fi spectator [The Art of Being a Spectator] (Bucharest: Nemira Publishing Group), 2021, ISBN 978-606-43-1306-5
- Durerea. Dincolo de teatru [Pain: Beyond the Theatre] (Bucharest: Nemira Publishing Group), 2020, ISBN 978-606-431-016-3
- Efectul Tartuffe, fascinatia teatrala a imposturii [The Tartuffe Effect: the Theatrical Fascination of Imposture] (Bucharest: Paideia Press), 2019, ISBN 978-606-748-275-1
- Clipa ca imagine: teatru si fotografie [The Instant as Image: Theatre and Photography] (Bucharest: Nemira Publishing Group), 2018, ISBN 978-606-43-0166-6
- Teatrul la persoana I [First Person Theatre] (Bucharest: Nemira Publishing Group), 2017, ISBN 978-606-758-780-7
- Hamlet and the Madness of the World (translated into English by Samuel Onn) (Bucharest: Romanian Cultural Institute Publishing House), 2016, ISBN 978-973-577-676-3
- Lectia, o meditatie cu sapte teme [The Lesson: A Meditation on Seven Themes] (Bucharest: Nemira Publishing Group), 2015, ISBN 978-606-758-515-5
- Hamlet si nebunia lumii [Hamlet and the Madness of the World] (Bucharest: Paideia Press), 2014, ISBN 978-606-748-028-3
- Teatrul e vis [Theatre is a Dream] (Bucharest: Paideia Press), 2013, ISBN 978-973-596-894-6
- European and Universal Dimensions of the Theatre of the Absurd (Editor) (Bucharest: Paideia Press), 2013, ISBN 978-973-596-729-1
- Posteritatea Absurdului [The Posterity of the Absurd] (Bucharest: Paideia Press), 2012, ISBN 978-973-596-771-0
- Ionescu/Ionesco: Un veac de ambiguitate [Ionescu/Ionesco: One Hundred Years of Ambiguity] (Bucharest: Paideia Press), 2011, ISBN 978-973-596-717-8
- In Search of Lost Space (translated into English by Ioana Jucan) (Bucharest: NUTF Press), 2010, ISBN 978-973-1790-45-9
- Fedra: de la Euripide la Racine, de la Seneca la Sarah Kane [Phaedra: from Euripides to Racine, from Seneca to Sarah Kane] (Bucharest: Paralela 45 Press), 2010, ISBN 978-973-47-1081-2
- Beckett: pur si simplu [Simply Beckett] (Bucharest: Paideia Press) (two editions), 2009, Vol. 1. ISBN 978-973-596-553-2, Vol. 2. ISBN 978-973-596-554-9, Vol 3. ISBN 978-973-596-555-6
- In cautarea spatiului pierdut [In Search of Lost Space] (Bucharest:Nemira Press), 2008, ISBN 978-973-143-313-4

== Articles and chapters ==
- "Between the 'Machinery of Transcendence' and the 'Machinery of War': The Unattended Moments of Eugene Ionesco" in Carole Cusack and Simone Marshall (Editors) Unattended Moments (Amsterdam: Brill, 2016), 2017
- "The Paradoxes of Memory in Theatre Criticism: Axiology, Imagination and Nostalgia" (Criticism in the Fontline – web-journal of IACT Hong Kong. No. 11), 2015
- "Teatr Zar's Armine, Sister: Watching as Witnessing and Criticism as Testimony" (Criticism in the Frontline – web-journal of IACT Hong Kong. No. 12), 2015
- "A Centenary Foretold: The Reception of Eugene Ionesco in his Fatherland", New Theatre Quarterly. Volume 29, Issue 1, 2013
- "Bali, l'instant habité et la joie d'être étranger" in Catherine Naugrette (Editor) Les Voyages ou l'ailleurs du théâtre (Brussels: Editions Alternatives Théâtrales), 2013
- "Bali, clipa implinita si bucuria de a fi strain [Bali, the Accomplished Moment and the Pleasure of Being a Stranger]" in Catherine Naugrette (Editor) Calatoriile sau orizonturile teatrului (Bucharest: Nemira Publishing group), 2013
- "A Passage to Neant: The Spectator in the Theatre of Samuel Beckett and Eugene Ionesco" in Norbert Bertrand Barbe (Editor), Le néant dans la pensée contemporaine – Publications du Centre Français d'Iconologie Comparée CFIC (Paris: Bès Editions), 2012
- "Cultural Diplomacy and the Flowering of the Human Spirit" (with Christopher Wynn – Sponsorship and Development Director of Edinburgh International Festival), Concept No. 3, 2012
- “The Theatre of the Absurd: After Half a Century”, Symbolon No. 2/2011, 2011
- “Samuel Beckett: Absence et accomplissement”, Alternatives Théâtrales Nos.106-107, 2010
- "Beckett behind the Iron Curtain" in Matthew Feldman and Mark Nixon (Editors), Getting Known: The International Reception of Samuel Beckett (London: Continuum), 2009
- "Eugène Ionesco or Eugen Ionescu: One Hundred Years of Ambiguity", Otago French Notes, No. 2, 2009
- "The Metaphors of Spectatorial Space: Samuel Beckett and Eugene Ionesco", Double Dialogues, No. 8: On Space, 2009
- "Le théâtre de l'absurde: les paradoxes de l'Européanisme", Lectures Philologiques, No. 3, 2009
- "Beckett and the dilemmas of theatricality", Romanian Studies in Theatre Theory, No. 3, 2009
- "Eugene Ionesco: Towards a Rich Theatre". Romanian Studies in Theatre Theory, No. 2, 2006
- "Theatre as a Road to Damascus", Theatre as a Force for Change, Proceedings of the 13th Congress of The International Association of Theatre Critics, 2003
- "Theatre and the Seven Maladies of Contemporary Society" (book chapter), Theatre: Quo Vadis? (Bucharest: Hyperion Press), 2002
