= 1992 Serbian early elections referendum =

11 October 1992

Results
Choice	Votes	%
Yes	3,040,911	96.39%
No	114,048	3.61%
Valid votes	3,154,959	99.31%
Invalid or blank votes	21,790	0.69%
Total votes	3,176,749	100.00%
Registered voters/turnout	6,977,081	45.53%

A referendum on holding early elections was held in Serbia on 11 October 1992. The proposal was approved by 96% of voters, and early general elections were subsequently held on 20 December.

== Results ==
Choice	Votes	%
For	3,040,911	96.39
Against	114,048	3.61
Total	3,154,959	100.00
Valid votes	3,154,959	99.31
Invalid/blank votes	21,790	0.69
Total votes	3,176,749	100.00
Registered voters/turnout	6,977,081	45.53
Source: Direct Democracy
