= Metronom (film) =

- Theatrical release poster
- Directed by: Alexandru Belc
- Written by: Alexandru Belc
- Produced by: Viorel Chesaru; Cătălin Mitulescu; Emmanuel Quillet; Ruxandra Slotea; Martine Vidalenc
- Starring: Mara Bugarin; Servan Lazarovici; Vlad Ivanov; Mihai Călin; Andreea Bibiri; Alina Berzunțeanu; Mara Vicol
- Cinematography: Tudor Vladimir Panduru
- Edited by: Patricia Chelaru
- Production companies: Strada Film; Midralgar; Chainsaw Europe
- Release dates: 24 May 2022 (Cannes); 4 November 2022 (Romania)
- Running time: 102 minutes
- Countries: Romania; France
- Language: Romanian

Metronom is a 2022 drama film written and directed by Alexandru Belc in his directorial debut. Starring Mara Bugarin and Servan Lazarovici, accompanied by: Vlad Ivanov, Mihai Călin, Andreea Bibiri, Alina Brezunțeanu and Mara Vicol. It had its world premiere on May 24, 2022, at the 75^{th} Cannes Film Festival where it competed for the Un Certain Regard and won Best Director.

The film was named on the shortlist for Romanian's entry for the Academy Award for Best International Feature Film at the 95^{th} Academy Awards, but it was not selected.

== Synopsis ==
In 1972 AD, Ana and Sorin are two teenagers who fall in love, but the young couple is forced to end their relationship when Sorin tells Ana that he is going to escape with his family to West Germany. After that, Ana and Sorin meet again, after the breakup, at the party of a colleague, Roxana. At the party, all the young people listen to the program "Metronom" by DJ Cornel Chiriac, broadcast by Radio Free Europe, a radio station banned at the time in Romania. The young people write a letter to Cornel Chiriac, through which they express their desire to leave the country under the Communist regime. They are detained by the militia that was notified and forced to describe in detail their participation in an act, seen as a protest against the regime.

== Cast ==
The actors participating in this film are:

- Mara Bugarin as Ana
- Șerban Lazarovici as Sorin
- Vlad Ivanov as Biriș
- Mihai Călin as Ana's father
- Andreea Bibiri as Ana's mother
- Alina Brezunțeanu as Sorin's mother
- Mara Vicol as Roxana
- Mihnea Moldoveanu as Geo
- Andrei Miercure as Silviu
- Măriuca Bosnea as Nicolate
- Eduard Chimac as Octav
- Tiberiu Zavelea as Tibi
- Claudia Soare as Maria
- Briana Macovei as Laura
- Pamela Iobaji as Mara
- Ana Bodea as Claudia
- Alin Florea as Ispas
- Alex Conovaru as Dinu
- Alexandru Nedelcu as Photographer
- Horațiu Bob as Security Guard 1
- Daniel Tomescu as Security Guard 2

== Release ==
It had its world premiere on May 24, 2022 at the 75^{th} Cannes Film Festival where it competed for the Un Certain Regard and won Best Director. Then, it was screened on July 25, 2022, at the 39^{th} Jerusalem Film Festival, on January 31, 2023, at the Gothenburg International Film Festival, etc. It was commercially released on November 4, 2022, in Romanian theaters.

== Reception ==
=== Critical reception ===
On the review aggregator website Rotten Tomatoes, 91% of 11 critics' reviews are positive, with an average rating of 7.6/10.

=== Accolades ===
Year	Award / Festival	Category	Recipient	Result	Ref.
2022	Cannes Film Festival	Un Certain Regard	Metronom	Nominated	
2022	Cannes Film Festival	Un Certain Regard - Best Director	Alexandru Belc	Won	
2022	Jerusalem Film Festival	Best International Film	Metronom	Won	
2022	Adelaide Film Festival	Best Feature Film	Metronom	Nominated	
2022	Chicago International Film Festival	New Directors Competition - Gold Hugo	Alexandru Belc	Nominated	
2022	Camerimage	Best Cinematographer's Debut	Alexandru Belc	Nominated	
2022	International Crime and Punishment Film Festival	Best Film	Metronom	Won	
2022	Gijón International Film Festival	Best Feature Film	Metronom	Won	
2022	Warsaw Film Festival	Crème de la Crème Competition	Metronom	Nominated	
2022	Anonimul International Independent Film Festival	Best Feature Film	Metronom	Nominated	
2023	Trieste Film Festival	Best Feature Film	Metronom	Nominated	
2023	Gopo Awards	Best Feature Film	Cătălin Mitulescu, Viorel Chesaru & Ruxandra Slotea	Nominated	
2023	Gopo Awards	Best Director	Alexandru Belc	Nominated	
2023	Gopo Awards	Best Debut Film	Metronom	Nominated	
2023	Gopo Awards	Best Actor in a Leading Role	Șerban Lazarovici	Nominated	
2023	Gopo Awards	Best Actress in a Leading Role	Mara Bugarin	Nominated	
2023	Gopo Awards	Best Screenplay	Alexandru Belc	Nominated	
2023	Gopo Awards	Best Cinematography	Tudor Vladimir Panduru	Won	
2023	Gopo Awards	Film Editing	Patricia Chelaru	Nominated	
2023	Gopo Awards	Best Sound	Alexandru Dumitru & Răzvan Ionescu	Nominated	
2023	Gopo Awards	Best Production Design	Bogdan Ionescu	Won	
2023	Gopo Awards	Best Costume Design	Ioana Covalciuc	Won	
2023	Gopo Awards	Best Make-up and Hair Styling	Irina Ianciuș & Marie-Pierre Hattabi	Won	
