= 1992 Serbian general election =

- 20 December 1992
- Presidential election
- Turnout: 64.15% (▼7.25 pp)
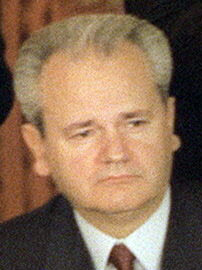

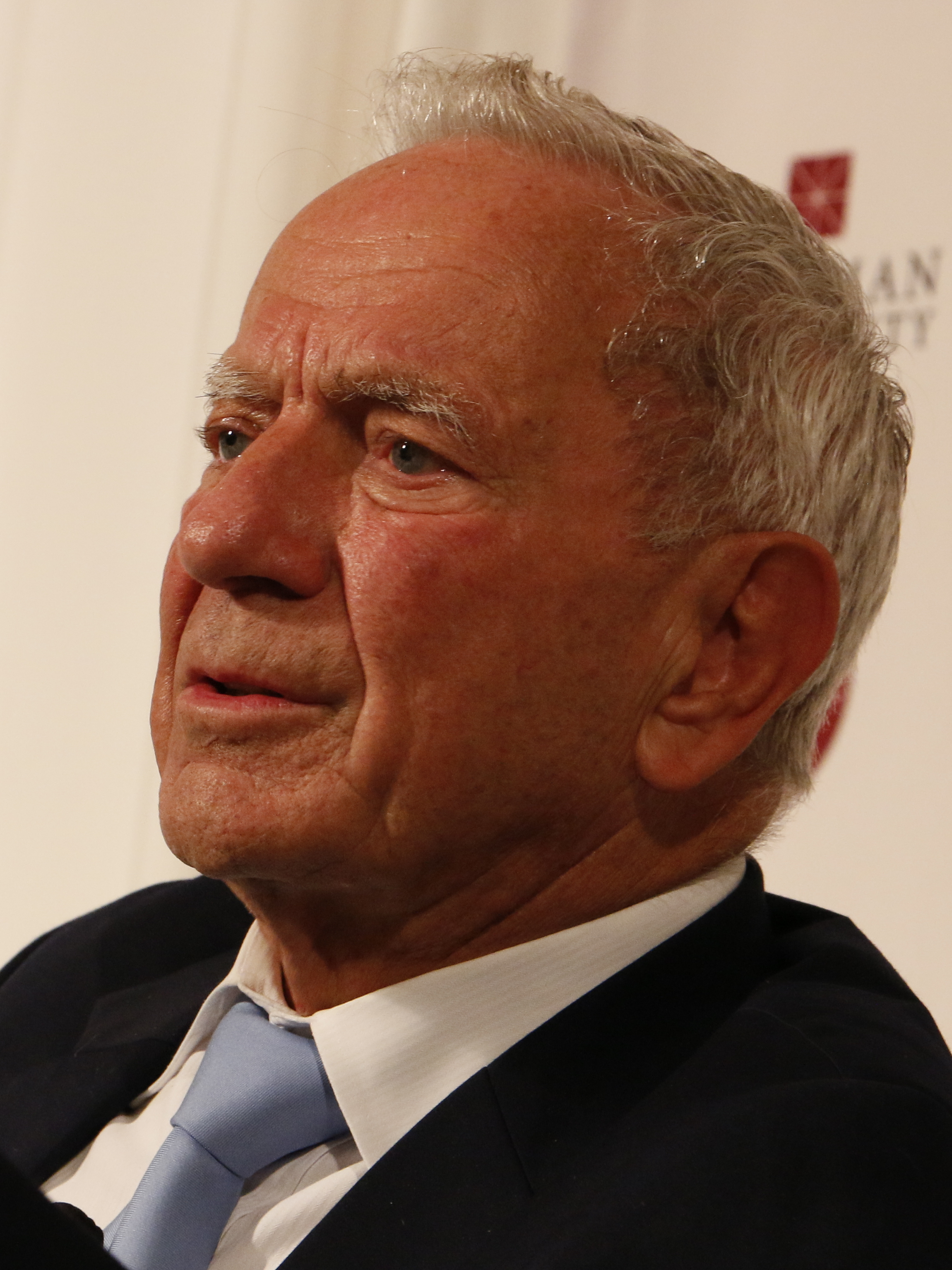
Candidate	Slobodan Milošević	Milan Panić
Party	SPS	Independent
Popular vote	2,515,047	1,516,693
Percentage	57.46%	34.65%
President before election
Slobodan Milošević
SPS
Elected President
Slobodan Milošević
SPS
- Parliamentary election
- Turnout: 69.58% (▼1.81 pp)
Party	Leader	Vote %	Seats	+/–
SPS	Slobodan Milošević	30.62	101	−93
SRS	Vojislav Šešelj	24.04	73	New
DEPOS	Vuk Drašković	17.98	50	+31
DS	Dragoljub Mićunović	4.42	6	−1
VMDK	András Ágoston	3.17	9	+1
RDSV	Dragoslav Petrović	1.52	2	0
GG–Arkan	Željko Ražnatović	0.37	5	New
DRSM	Azar Zulji	0.13	1	0
This lists parties that won seats. See the complete results below.
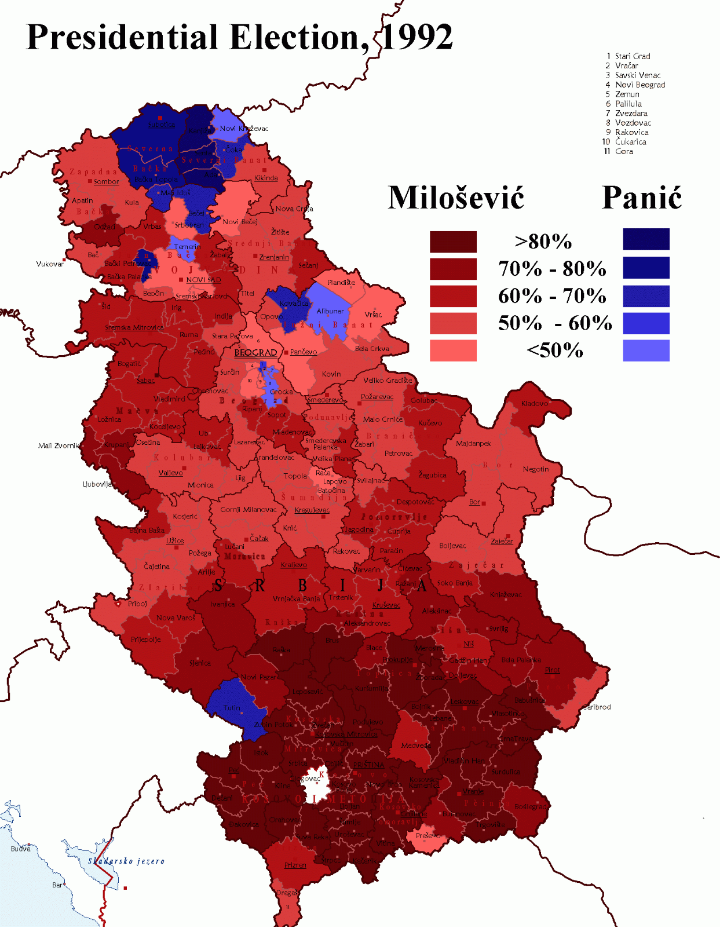
Results of the presidential election by municipality
Prime Minister before	Prime Minister after
Radoman Božović; SPS	Nikola Šainović; SPS

General elections were held in Serbia on 20 December 1992. The vote was held only two years after the previous election and as a result of a referendum which approved holding early elections.

The elections were won by Slobodan Milošević and his Socialist Party of Serbia (SPS), which won 101 of the 250 seats in the National Assembly. The SPS formed a government with Vojislav Šešelj's Serbian Radical Party. The presidential election was marked by a total domination of state-run media by Milošević with accusations of voter fraud and tampering. Milan Panić refused to accept the result, and stated that he believed he was the true election winner.

== Background ==
Slobodan Milošević was a candidate of the Socialist Party of Serbia and was solely endorsed by the Serbian Radical Party.

Milan Panić was an independent candidate endorsed by the Democratic Movement of Serbia and the Democratic Party. The elections were boycotted by political parties of ethnic Kosovo Albanians, who made up around 17% of the population.

== Electoral lists ==
Following electoral lists are electoral lists that received seats in the National Assembly after the 1992 election:

#	Ballot name	Representative	Main ideology	Political position
1	Socialist Party of Serbia – Slobodan Milošević; SPS	Slobodan Milošević	Populism	Left-wing
2	Serbian Radical Party – dr Vojislav Šešelj; SRS	Vojislav Šešelj	Ultranationalism	Far-right
3	DEPOS – Democratic Movement of Serbia; SPO, DSS, ND, SLS	Vojislav Koštunica	Anti-Milošević	Centre-right
4	Democratic Fellowship of Vojvodina Hungarians – András Ágoston; VMDK/DZVM	András Ágoston	Minority politics	Centre
5	Democratic Party – Zoran Đinđić; DS	Zoran Đinđić	Liberalism	Centre-right
6	Civic Group – Željko Ražnatović Arkan; GG ŽRA	Željko Ražnatović Arkan	Ultranationalism	Far-right
7	Peasants Party of Serbia – Milomir Babić; SSS	Milomir Babić	Agrarianism	Centre
8	Democratic Party and Reformist Democratic Party of Vojvodina Coalition – Dragoljub Mićunović; RDSV, DS	Dragoljub Mićunović	Vojvodina autonomism	Centre-left
9	Democratic Reform Party of Muslims – Džezair Murati; DRSM	Džezair Murati	Minority politics	Left-wing

== Results ==
=== Presidential ===
Candidate	Party	Votes	%
Slobodan Milošević	Socialist Party of Serbia	2,515,047	57.46
Milan Panić	Independent	1,516,693	34.65
Milan Paroški	People's Party	147,693	3.37
Dragan Vasiljković	Independent	87,847	2.01
Jezdimir Vasiljević	Independent	61,729	1.41
Miroslav Milanović	Independent	28,010	0.64
Blažo Perović	Democratic Fatherland Coalition	20,326	0.46
Total		4,377,345	100.00
Valid votes		4,377,345	98.20
Invalid/blank votes		80,326	1.80
Total votes		4,457,671	100.00
Registered voters/turnout		6,949,150	64.15

=== Parliamentary ===
Party	Votes	%	Seats	+/–
Socialist Party of Serbia	1,359,086	30.62	101	–93
Serbian Radical Party	1,066,765	24.04	73	New
Democratic Movement of Serbia	797,831	17.98	50	+31
Democratic Party	196,347	4.42	6	–1
Democratic Fellowship of Vojvodina Hungarians	140,825	3.17	9	+1
Serbian Opposition: NS, SRB	130,139	2.93	0	–2
Peasants Party of Serbia	128,240	2.89	3	+1
Serbian National Renewal	84,568	1.91	0	0
Reformist Democratic Party of Vojvodina–Democratic Party	71,865	1.62	2	0
Social Democratic Party	47,404	1.07	0	0
LSV–NSS–RS–RK–GSS	36,780	0.83	0	–1
League of Communists – Movement for Yugoslavia	32,346	0.73	0	New
Democratic Alliance of Croats in Vojvodina	17,622	0.40	0	–1
Movement for the Protection of Human Rights	17,495	0.39	0	0
Željko Ražnatović Arkan Citizen's Group	17,352	0.39	5	New
Civic Alliance of Serbia	17,276	0.39	0	New
Party for Democratic Action	17,172	0.39	0	–1
Citizens of Nisava-Moravia and Timok	16,172	0.36	0	New
Democratic Party of Albanians	10,242	0.23	0	New
Serb Democratic Party	9,771	0.22	0	–1
Progressive Party	9,569	0.22	0	New
Workers' Party of Serbia	8,578	0.19	0	New
Democratic Fatherland Coalition	8,291	0.19	0	New
Democratic Reform Party of Muslims	6,336	0.14	1	0
New Communist Movement of Yugoslavia	5,042	0.11	0	0
Social Democratic Party of Roma	3,214	0.07	0	0
Yugoslav Democratic Party of Goodwill	3,037	0.07	0	New
New Green Party	3,016	0.07	0	New
Movement of Vlachs and Romanians of Yugoslavia	2,827	0.06	0	New
Democratic Political Party of Roma	2,673	0.06	0	0
Party of Businessmen and Private Initiatives	2,643	0.06	0	New
Green Party	2,494	0.06	0	0
Great Rock'n'Roll Party	2,295	0.05	0	New
Federal Party of Yugoslavs – Bunjevac-Šokac Party	2,051	0.05	0	New
Serbian Patriotic Union	1,764	0.04	0	New
Democratic Union of the Centre	1,721	0.04	0	New
Socialist People's Party of Yugoslavia – NKPJ	1,711	0.04	0	New
Economically Radical Party	1,558	0.04	0	New
Radical Bloc in the Communists of Yugoslavia	1,516	0.03	0	New
Party for Peace and Prosperity	1,363	0.03	0	New
Yugoslav Democratic Party	1,251	0.03	0	New
Belgrade Party Best	1,198	0.03	0	New
Republican Party	1,037	0.02	0	0
Socialist People's Party	1,008	0.02	0	New
KPJ–PJP–NKPJ–SDPJ–SRJ	781	0.02	0	New
Liberal Party	632	0.01	0	0
Party Association of Families of Serbia–SPAS	593	0.01	0	New
Natural Law Party	523	0.01	0	New
Independents	143,884	3.24	0	–8
Total	4,437,904	100.00	250	0
Valid votes	4,437,904	94.15		
Invalid/blank votes	275,861	5.85		
Total votes	4,713,765	100.00		
Registered voters/turnout	6,774,995	69.58		
Source: RIK
