= Radu Stanca =

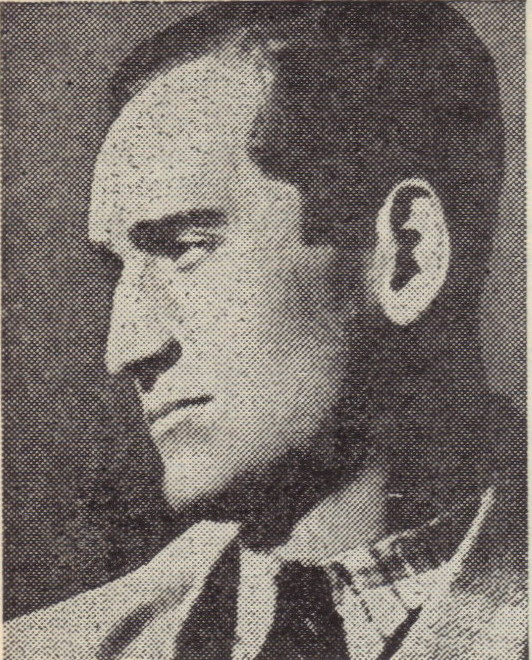
Radu Stanca

Radu Stanca (March 5, 1920 – December 26, 1962) was a Romanian poet, playwright, theatre director, theatre critic and theoretician.

== Biography ==
Born in Sebeș, he spent his early years in Cluj, where he attended the Gheorghe Barițiu High School. He then studied philosophy at the University of Cluj, completing his studies in 1942 in Sibiu (after part of the university moved there when Northern Transylvania was ceded to Hungary as a result of the Second Vienna Award). Stanca was member of the Sibiu Literary Circle, a movement of young poets and essayists who tried, between 1946 and 1948, to rejuvenate the main literary style and aesthetical thinking. In 1947 he received the Lovinescu award for his tragicomedy Dona Juana. He died in Cluj, at age 42.

One of the leading Romanian theatres is the Radu Stanca National Theatre in Sibiu. Streets in Alba Iulia, Cluj-Napoca, and Sibiu bear his name.
