= Rimas Tuminas =

Lithuanian theatre director (1952–2024)

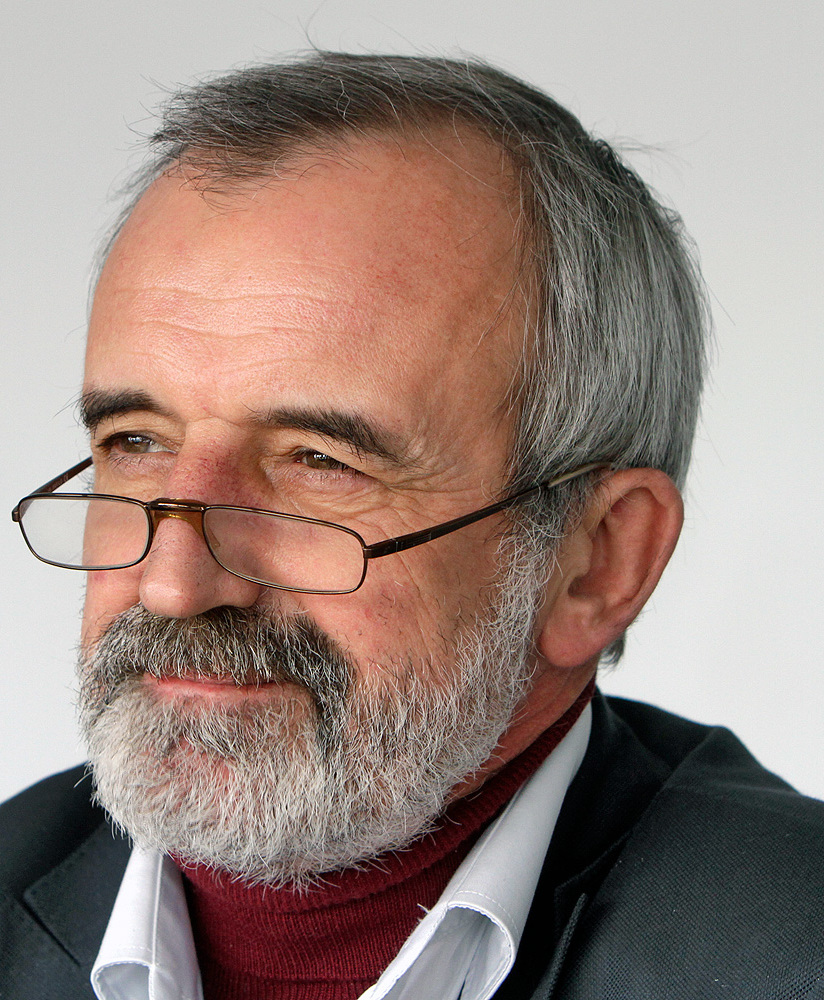
Tuminas in 2011

Rimas Tuminas (20 January 1952 – 6 March 2024) was a Lithuanian theatre director. He was awarded the State Prize of Russia in 1999. From 2007 he was the Artistic director of the Moscow Vakhtangov theatre. With Tuminas, the Vakhtangov Theatre occupied a leading position among the Russian theatres. In 2011, the theatre was recognized as the most visited theatre in Moscow.

== Biography ==
From 1970 to 1974, Tuminas studied at the Conservatory of Lithuania. In 1978 he finished GITIS in Moscow (Joseph Tumanov's directing course). From 1979 he was the director of Lithuanian national drama theatre. In 1990 he founded the Little Theatre of Vilnius.

From 2012 he organised the Vasara Annual Festival in Druskininkai. Among his well-known productions are Eugene Onegin, Uncle Vanya, and Masquerade.

From 2014, he suffered from lung cancer. Tuminas died in Gallipoli, Apulia on 6 March 2024, at the age of 72.

== Awards ==
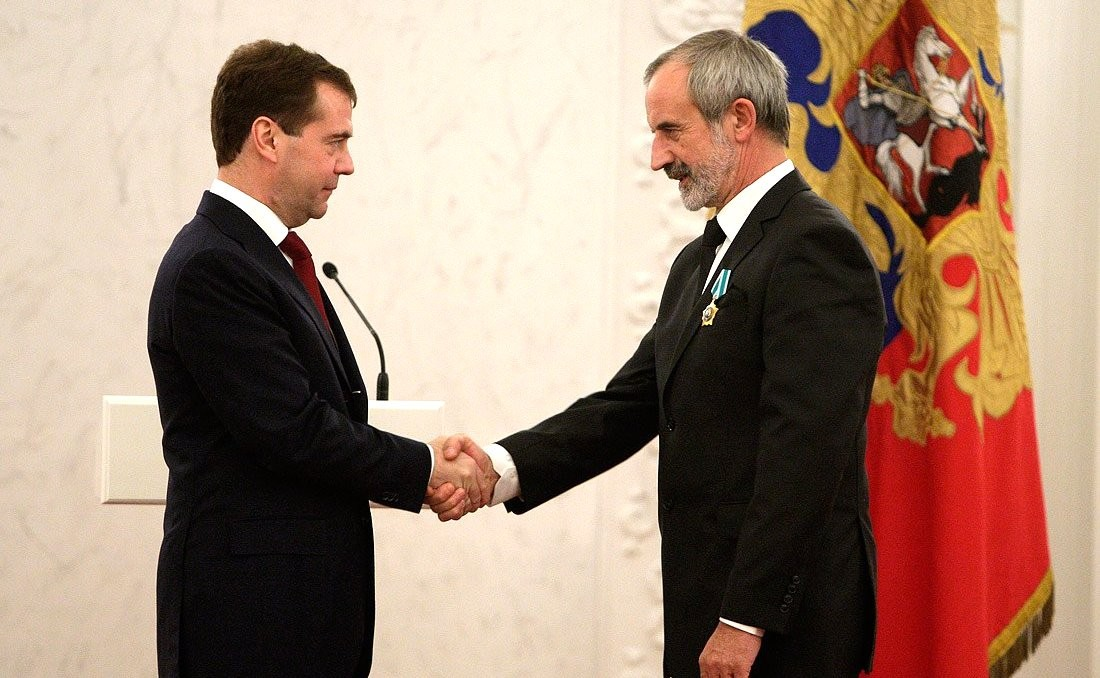
Russian President Dmitry Medvedev awarded on Order of Friendship, 4 November 2010

- State Prize of the Russian Federation
- Russian Festival of Performing Arts Golden Mask Award for Directing Eugene Onegin (2014)
- International Stanislavsky Theatre Award
- Crystal Turandot Award
- Golden Nail Award
- Order of Friendship (Russia)
- Tsarskoselskaya Art Award
- Order of Merit of the Republic of Poland
