= Mikhail Milchik =

Russian art historian

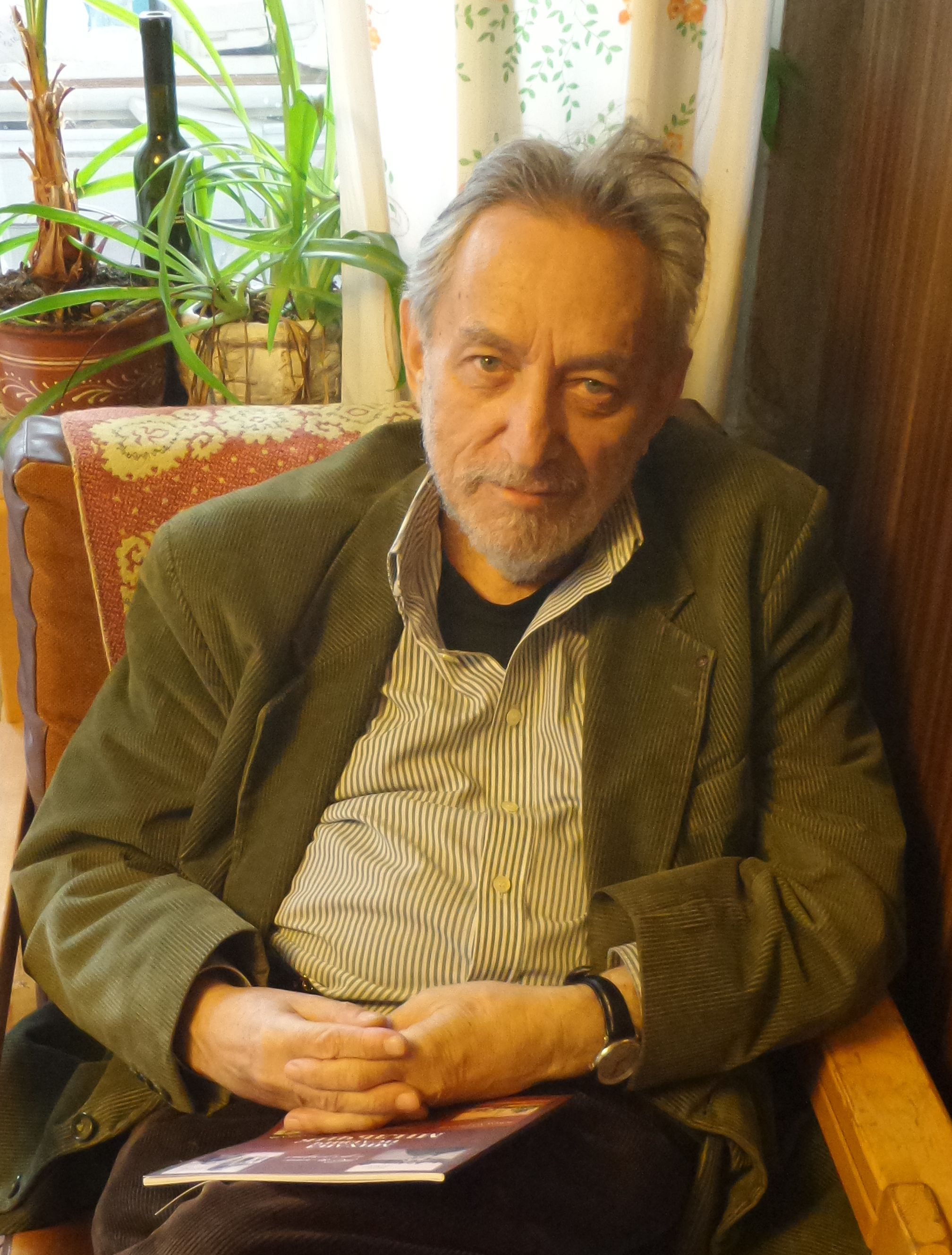
Milchik (2015)

Mikhail Isayevich Milchik (Russian: Михаил Исаевич Мильчик) (born July 4, 1934, Leningrad ) is a Soviet and Russian art historian, member of the Union of Architects of Russia (since 1984), member of the Councils for the Preservation of Cultural Heritage under the Government of St. Petersburg and the Ministry of Culture of the Russian Federation. His interests include depictions of architecture on ancient Russian icons, wooden architecture of the Northern Russia, and fortifications architecture. He authored over 300 works, including 22 books, on various subjects related to architecture.

== Awards and decorations ==
His awards and decorations include:

- "Resident of Blockade Leningrad" badge
- 2008: Likhachev Foundation prize "For the preservation of the cultural heritage of Russia"
- Серебряный диплом XVII международного фестиваля «Зодчество» за составление и научное редактирование книги «Архитектурное наследие Великого Новгорода и *Новгородской области», 2009 г.
- 2012: Petropol award for the book «Венеция Иосифа Бродского» (Venice of Joseph Brodsky)
- Благодарственная грамота Правительства Санкт-Петербурга, 2013 г.
- Благодарственная грамота Комитета по охране и использованию памятников Правительства Санкт-Петербурга (КГИОП), 2014 г.
- 2016: Tsarskoselskaya Art Award
- Благодарность Министра культуры РФ, 2016 г.
- Почетная грамота КГИОП Правительства Санкт-Петербурга, 2016 г.
