= Thalia Hall, Sibiu =

Thalia Hall
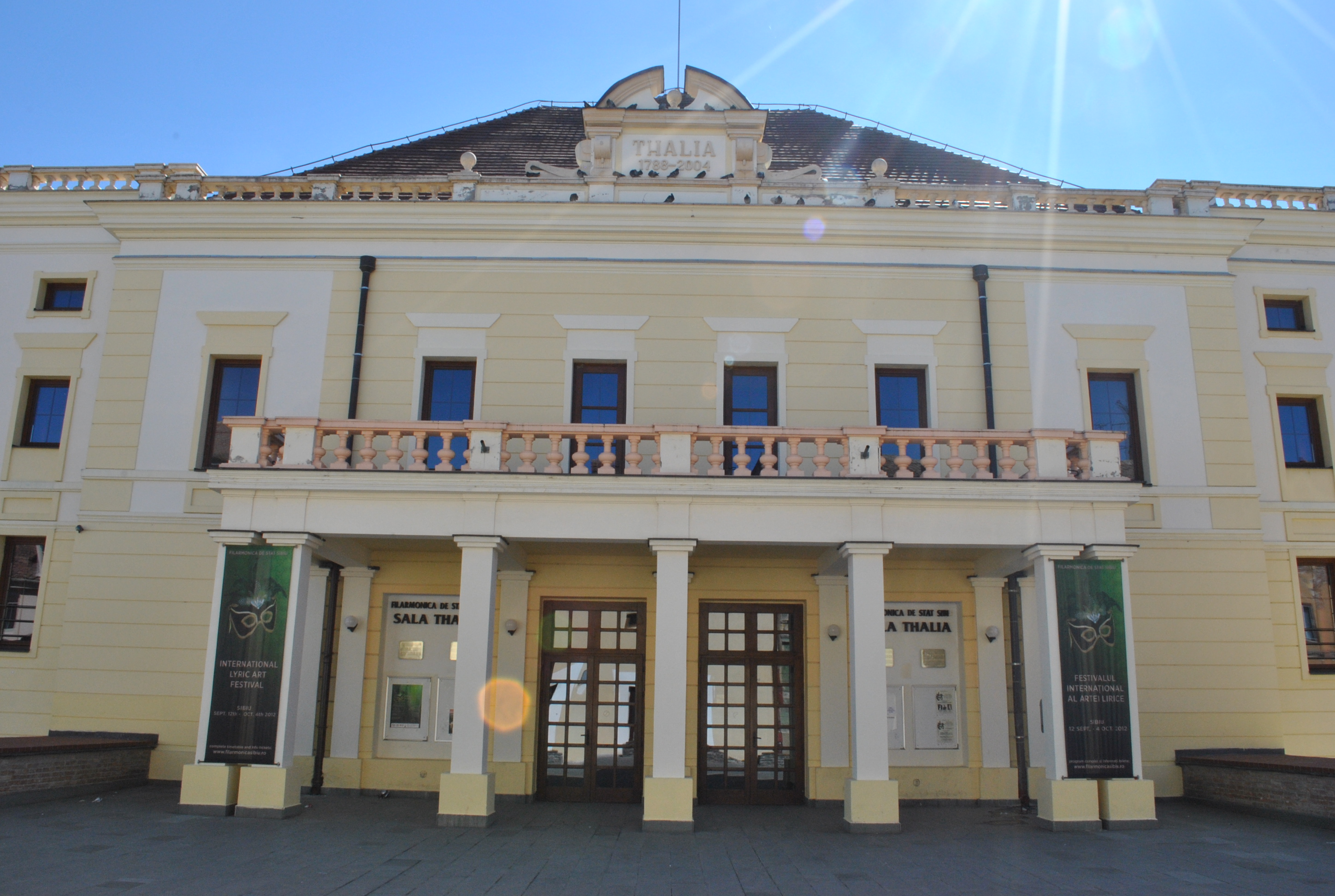
- The facade of the Thalia Hall
- Interactive map of the Thalia Hall area

General information
- Location: Corneliu Coposu Bulevard, Thick Tower, Sibiu, Romania
- Coordinates: 45.7927°N 24.1520°E
- Opened: June, 1788

Other information
- Seating capacity: 482

Website
- www.filarmonicasibiu.ro

The Thalia Hall (Romanian: Sala Thalia) is a theatre and concert hall situated in Sibiu, Romania. As of October 7, 2004, the hall serves as the new location of the State Philharmonic of Sibiu.

== History ==
The construction of Thalia Hall began in 1787 and was completed in June 1788, becoming the first theatre in the country. The hall was built by Martin Hochmeister, who due to a lack of space in the center of the town, decided to build it in the Thick Tower part of the defence wall that surrounded the town.

The hall was damaged by two fires. The first one took place in 1826 and the damages were repaired by Hochmeister himself. The second fire took place on February 13, 1949 and was caused by a lit cigarette. The damage caused by the second fire was to such an extent, that the activity had to be moved to the former Apollo cinema, where the Radu Stanca National Theatre is now located.
