= Milan Panić =

Serbian businessman and politician (1929–2026)

- Милан Панић
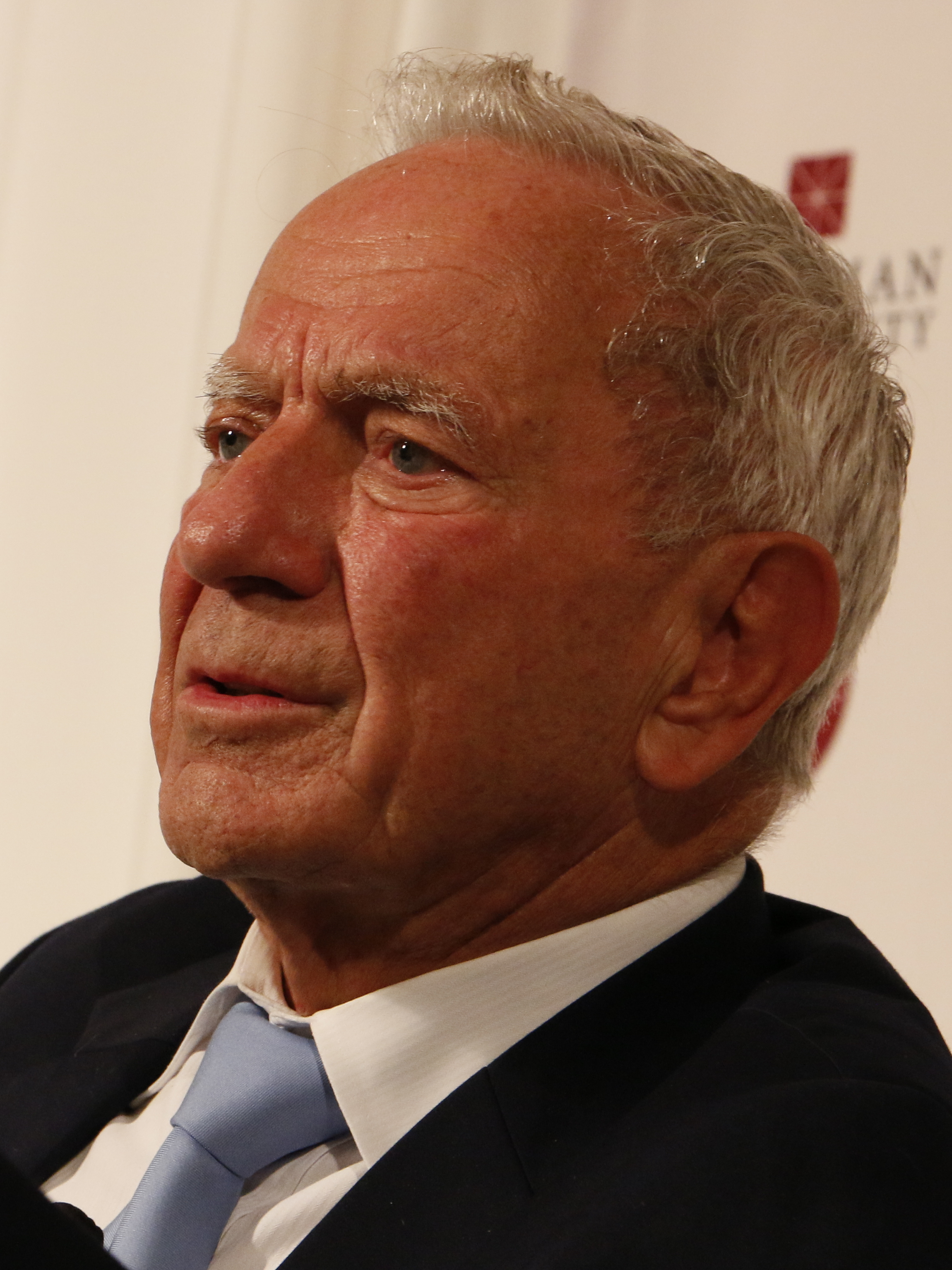
- Panić in 2015

1st Prime Minister of FR Yugoslavia
- In office 14 July 1992 – 9 February 1993
- President: Dobrica Ćosić
- Deputy: Oskar Kovač; Radoje Kontić
- Preceded by: Position established
- Succeeded by: Radoje Kontić

1st Minister of Defence of FR Yugoslavia
- In office 14 July 1992 – 2 March 1993
- Prime Minister: Himself; Radoje Kontić
- Preceded by: Position established
- Succeeded by: Pavle Bulatović

Personal details
- Born: 20 December 1929 Belgrade, Kingdom of Yugoslavia
- Died: 24 September 2026 (aged 96) Pasadena, California, U.S.
- Party: Independent
- Other political affiliations: DEPOS (1992); SZP (1998–2000)
- Spouses: Jelica Narandžić (m. 1954; died 1976) Sally Taylor (m. 1976; div. 1998) Milena Kitić (m. 2006; div. 2011) Alexandra Novak (m. 2019)

Milan Panić (Serbian Cyrillic: Милан Панић, pronounced [mǐlan pǎːnit͡ɕ]; 20 December 1929 – 24 September 2026) was a Serbian and American businessman, humanitarian and politician. He served as the Prime Minister of the Federal Republic of Yugoslavia from 1992 to 1993. During and after his time as prime minister, he campaigned for peace and democracy in the Balkan region. He ran for President of Serbia in 1992, ultimately coming in second to Slobodan Milošević in an election marked by allegations of media and vote tampering by the ruling party. Panić became Prime Minister of Yugoslavia while an American citizen. The legality of retaining U.S. citizenship while accepting this office has been questioned based on a Constitutional prohibition of a U.S. citizen accepting office on behalf of a foreign nation. Panić is the first U.S. citizen to occupy a high-level political position in a foreign country since Golda Meir. Panić is also the first civilian to serve as Defence Minister in the history of Serbia.

Outside of his political and humanitarian activities, Panić built a lengthy career in the pharmaceutical and medical industries. He grew ICN Pharmaceuticals from a small operation in his garage into a global pharmaceutical corporation listed on the New York Stock Exchange, with over $672 million in annual sales across 90 countries at its peak. After retiring from ICN, he spun off an ICN subsidiary and renamed it MP Biomedicals. The company is a global producer of life science and diagnostic products, with operations in North America, Asia, Australia, and Europe. In October 2015, Panić announced the pending sale of MP Biomedicals to a Chinese chemical company, Valiant Fine Chemicals Co., Ltd.

Panić pursued philanthropy personally and through his Milan Panić Jr. Foundation, as well as MP Global Enterprises & Associates, LLC. As part of his philanthropic efforts, he sponsored scholarships at the MIT-Harvard Medical School Program and lectured on peacebuilding at George Washington University and University of Southern California. He was also a member of the President's cabinet at Chapman University, Vice Chairman and sponsor of the Los Angeles Opera, and frequent sponsor of California cultural institutions and charities.

== Early life ==
=== Childhood in Serbia ===
Panić was born in Belgrade, Kingdom of Yugoslavia (present-day Serbia) on 20 December 1929, into a middle-class family. His father, a prominent government official, died when he was three years old, leaving Panić's mother to raise him and his sisters. Faced with a growing shortage of goods due to the Nazi occupation of Belgrade, Panić started a working vegetable farm to support his family and community. As a young student, he gravitated toward geography and chemistry, assembling a small laboratory in his room to conduct experiments. During World War II, Panić, then only 14 years old, joined the Yugoslav Partisans to fight the growing Nazi influence in Yugoslavia. After returning from military service, he resumed his secondary studies in biochemistry at the Belgrade Faculty of Technology. Panić enrolled as a medical student at the University of Belgrade medical school before transferring to the biochemistry degree program.

=== Cycling career ===
Panić was an avid cyclist from his youth into early adulthood. Over the course of his cycling career, he eventually rose to become a Yugoslavian national champion and competed at the international level on prominent teams including the Yugoslavian national and as an alternate athlete on the nation's Summer Olympic team. While traveling to an international cycling tournament in the Netherlands in 1955, Panić defected to Austria with his wife Jelica Panić (née Narandžić.)

=== Defection and Refugee Status ===
After defecting to Austria in August 1955, Panić and his wife applied for asylum in Germany and moved to a West German refugee camp. While in Germany, he enrolled in the PhD program at the University of Heidelberg and worked as a furniture mover. After receiving asylum in Germany several months after his initial arrival, Panić applied for a program that resettled refugees in the United States. Upon their acceptance into the program, he and Jelica moved to Fontana, California in early 1956. Panić worked in labs at Kaiser Steel and the University of Southern California, where he also studied biochemistry. By 1959, Panić worked on starting his own business, the International Chemical and Nuclear Corporation (ICN).

== Business career ==
=== Launch of ICN ===
In 1959, Panić launched the International Chemical and Nuclear Corporation (ICN) out of his garage just outside of Los Angeles, California using $200 in startup capital. His initial business model was built upon synthesizing chemical compounds to sell to California research labs. During the 1960s, ICN marketed a generic version of L-Dopa, a widely used Parkinson's disease antidote. Panić led ICN over the following decades to develop the building blocks for several thousand potential new drugs. As ICN grew, Panić moved his operations from Pasadena, California to a new research lab in Costa Mesa, California and renamed the company ICN Pharmaceuticals. In 1967, ICN was officially listed on the New York Stock Exchange.

=== Discovery of Ribavirin and Production of Virazole ===
In 1972, ICN discovered the ribavirin compound, the earliest recorded broad spectrum antiviral agent. Chemists Joseph T. Witkovski and Ronald K. Robins were integral to the compound's creation. In 1985, ribavirin was approved under the name Virazole by the Food and Drug Administration for the treatment of respiratory syncytial virus (RSV), an upper respiratory tract disease that primarily affects children. In 1991, ICN created the SPAG-2 (Small Particle Aerosol Generator) nebulizer to administer an aerosolized form of ribavirin during hospital treatments of specific viral infections.

In 1985, ICN and the Eastman-Kodak company launched a six-year, $45 million joint venture to research drugs that slow, halt, or reverse the aging process. Between 1986 and 1987, the FDA contended that ICN had exaggerated Virazole's effectiveness in treating other illnesses including the AIDS virus. ICN settled with the FDA in 1991. In January 1988, ICN acquired 7.3% of Swiss pharmaceutical company Hoffman-La Roche, as part of a reported acquisition strategy to expand ICN's reach and marketing capabilities.

Following the fall of the Berlin Wall, ICN acquired multiple pharmaceutical firms in Eastern Europe. In May 1991, ICN bought 75% of Galenika, Yugoslavia's largest drug maker at the time. After eight months, the new subsidiary ICN-Galenika was producing revenues of $364 million. In April 1992, ICN Pharmaceuticals and ICN-Galenika partially financed a $100,000 initiative to vaccinate children in the Yugoslav province of Kosovo. In 1995, the Securities and Exchange Commission (SEC) investigated ICN over shareholder concerns related to Panić's sale of company stock before a key regulatory decision by the FDA. After a three-year investigation, the SEC dropped its inquiry in 1998 with no charges filed.

=== Global Success and End of Tenure at ICN ===
In 1998, the FDA approved Virazole for the treatment of Hepatitis C in conjunction with another medication called interferon. Virazole eventually became a global standard treatment for multiple pediatric and adult medical conditions. Uses include the effective treatment of chronic Hepatitis C in conjunction with interferon, multiple viral fevers including influenza, parainfluenza, adenovirus, measles, Crimean-Congo hemorrhagic fever and Lassa fever, as well as renal impairment and thyroid cancer.

During the 1990s, Panić resolved four sexual harassment suits filed by former employees of ICN. In 2002, ICN settled an SEC civil lawsuit related to misleading statements issued regarding their products. Panić decided to retire as CEO and Chairman of ICN in June 2002 after opposing shareholders took control of ICN's Board of Directors. Over the course of his career as Chairman, CEO, and President, Panić led ICN to annual sales in 90 countries exceeding $672 million (USD), with over 600 drugs in its portfolio by his final year in 2001.

Panić maintained other business entities and investments both in the U.S. and internationally. In 2003, after Panić's departure, ICN Pharmaceuticals changed its name to Valeant Pharmaceuticals International, Inc.

=== MP Biomedicals ===
After retiring from ICN, Panić bought a bioassay subsidiary of ICN Biomedicals and changed its name to MP Biomedicals. MP specializes in research and development of life science and diagnostic products. MP's global headquarters is located in Santa Ana, California, with its U.S. headquarters and central distribution center located in Solon, Ohio. The company maintains global operations in North America, South America, Asia, Australia, and Europe. On 14 June 2010, Panić and MP acquired ICPBio International LTD., a New Zealand-based protein biologics manufacturing company. On 11 December 2014, the FDA approved MP Diagnostics HTLV Blot 2.4, the first FDA-licensed supplemental test for Human T-cell Lymphotropic Virus-I/II (HTLV-I/II). In October 2015, Panić announced the sale of MP Biomedicals to China-based Valiant Fine Chemicals Co. Ltd., a developer of chemical products.

== Political and public service in Europe ==
=== Prime Minister of Yugoslavia ===
In July 1992, Panić assumed the position of Prime Minister of the Federal Republic of Yugoslavia, at the request of Yugoslav President Dobrica Ćosić and Serbian President Slobodan Milošević. Panić set out goals of achieving peace, drafting a constitution, lifting U.N. sanctions, and pushing for the closure of concentration camps. In August 1992, he played a central role in the London International Conference on the Former Yugoslavia, which called for international attention to the country's worsening economic and political situation. At the conference, Panić submitted a twelve-point Plan for Peace. One month later, Panić delivered a "Speech of Peace" address in front of the United Nations General Assembly.

On 2 December 1992, Panić announced his intention to challenge Milošević for the Serbian presidency, campaigning on a platform of economic reforms and bringing a peaceful resolution to the Bosnian War. Panić contended that Milošević had crippled Serbia by allowing unemployment and inflation to rise, while inciting isolation and sanctions by the international community. Panić appealed directly to Serbian youth and older voters seeking a compromise in the ongoing conflict that included recognition of Croatia and Bosnia-Herzegovina with their current borders. In the 1992 Serbian general election, Panić came in second behind Milošević, receiving 32% of votes cast. In the aftermath, observers at the Helsinki Commission, political experts, and journalists alleged that Milošević and his supporters had manipulated the election results through improper use of state media and vote tampering.

=== Yugoslavia peace efforts and Dayton Accords ===
Following his term as prime minister, Panić stayed involved in the effort to restore peace and democracy in the region. In December 1993, he began correspondence with U.S. President Bill Clinton regarding a proposed peace summit with all heads of state of the former Yugoslavia. In 1994, he met with Clinton and his advisers in California to discuss the proposal further. Following additional discussions over the next two years, in which Panić proposed a Balkans peace conference, the Clinton Administration convened the Conference on Establishing Peace at Wright-Patterson Air Force Base in Dayton, Ohio, USA.

The Conference culminated in the signing of the Dayton Accords on 21 November 1995, which brought an end to the Bosnian War by dividing Bosnia and Herzegovina into two separate entities: The Federation of Bosnia and Herzegovina and the Republika Srpska. Following the end of the war, Panić continued to push for democracy in the Yugoslav region by convening political activists and advocating in the media.

== Personal life ==
=== Philanthropic contributions ===
Panić provided philanthropic support to various universities, research programs, museums, political causes and charities through both his Milan Panić Jr. Foundation and MP Global Enterprises & Associates, LLC. As part of his philanthropic efforts, he supported the Muscular Dystrophy Association and sponsored scholarships at the MIT-Harvard Medical School Program. Panić lectured frequently on peacebuilding at George Washington University, University of Southern California, and Chapman University – where he was a member of the President's cabinet.

He provided support to the Freedoms Foundation in Valley Forge, Pennsylvania, penning the Bill of Responsibilities and donating a Bill of Responsibilities Monument to their headquarters in 1990. He was a frequent supporter of California cultural institutions including the Los Angeles Opera, where he served as a Vice Chairman and sponsored season-opening performances from 2002 on. He also provided charitable support to City of Hope Cancer Research and Treatment Center.

=== Family and death ===
Panić was married to mezzo-soprano opera singer Milena Kitic before the couple divorced; together they had a son. Panić died in Pasadena, California on 24 September 2026, at the age of 96.

== Awards and honors ==
Panić was awarded the Ellis Island Medal of Honor by the Statue of Liberty-Ellis Island Foundation on 27 October 1986. He was named "European of the Year" in 1992 by the Wall Street Journal Europe, which cited his efforts while serving Yugoslavian Prime Minister to introduce democratic, free market reforms, bring peace, and galvanize opposition to Slobodan Milošević. Panić was presented the Chamber Global Award by the Chamber of Commerce Belgium-Luxembourg South-Eastern Europe in Brussels on 17 December 2002. In February 2015, the Lifeline Humanitarian Organization of New York awarded Panić a lifetime achievement award for his philanthropic support of academic, cultural, political, and relief organizations around the world.

== Works ==
- Prime Minister for Peace: My Struggle for Serbian Democracy. With Kevin C. Murphy. Lanham, MD: Rowman and Littlefield., 2015.

Political offices
Preceded by Aleksandar Mitrović; Acting Prime Minister of Yugoslavia	Prime Minister of the Federal Republic of Yugoslavia; 1992–1993	Succeeded by Radoje Kontić
