= Aditi Mangaldas =

Indian dancer and choreographer

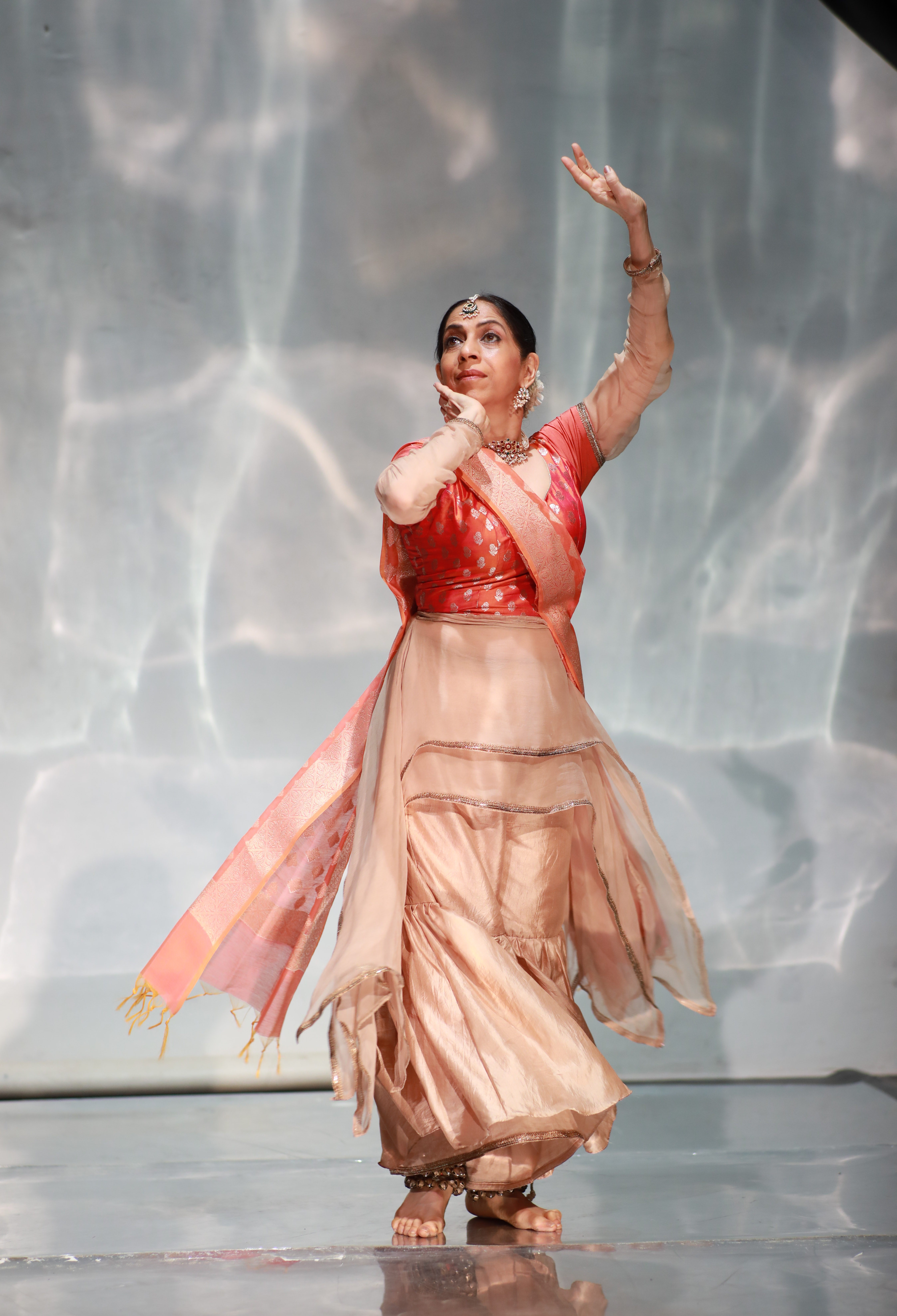
- Aditi Mangaldas presenting LOST.. in the forest! for Sampradaya Dance Creations, Canada in 2021
- Born: 1960 (age 65–66); Mumbai, Maharashtra, India
- Known for: Dance and choreography
- Movement: Classical Kathak, Contemporary Kathak
- Awards: National Sangeet Natak Akademi Award (2013); Gujarat Sangeet Natak Academy Award (2007); Sanjukta Panigrahi Award (2012); Mahari Award (2022); Priyadarshini Award (1998)

Aditi Mangaldas (born 1960) is a Kathak dancer and choreographer, who is known for her classical Kathak as well as 'contemporary dance based on kathak" repertoire. Mangaldas is hailed as one of the leading dancers in the field of Kathak in India as well as across the world.

Mangaldas has trained under Kumudini Lakhia and Pundit Birju Maharaj. Besides dancing classical Kathak, she uses the strong foundation of classical dance to evolve a contemporary vocabulary in Kathak, for which she has received international acclaim. Mangaldas has won numerous awards for her notable contributions in Kathak including the National Sangeet NatakAkademi Award in 2013; which due to compelling reasons she declined. She heads the Aditi Mangaldas Dance Company – The Drishtikon Dance Foundation, Delhi, where she is the artistic director and runs the repertory consisting of Kathak dancers and musicians.

== Early life and training ==
Born in 1960, Aditi Mangaldas was brought up in Ahmedabad, where she completed her Bachelor of Science from St. Xavier's College.

She started training in Kathak dance under Kumudini Lakhia at Kadamb Centre for Dance in Ahmedabad at a young age. Later at the behest of her aunt Pupul Jayakar, she moved to Delhi to further her dance training under the tutelage of Pundit Birju Maharaj at Kathak Kendra, Delhi. During her training with both her Gurus, she travelled to many parts of the world as a member of their troupe.

== Career ==
Mangaldas has given Kathak performances in major dance festivals in India and across the globe. As a young dancer, she has been featured in "Festivals of India" in United Kingdom, United States and the then Soviet Union. She has been invited by notable international festivals and has now performed in all continents across the world such as the 2016 Perth International Arts Festival, Australia, 2012 Edinburgh International Festival, UK, Sibiu International Theatre Festival, Romania, 2017 India By the Nile festival, Egypt, 2019 Kalaa Utsavam at the Esplanade – Theatres On The Bay, Singapore, Chekhov International Theatre Festival, Moscow.

Besides dancing solos, she has also choreographed a number of group ensembles that have an arresting and dynamic texture using both the classical and the contemporary. Mangaldas started off on her choreographic journey by producing several works including Cheekh, SwagatVistar, The Sound of the Universe, and Vrindakriti. In 2005, Aditi Mangaldas Dance Company with a troupe of six dancers and three musicians made its US debut at the Asia Society with Footprints on Water.

Mangaldas later went on to present major solo and group productions such as: Uncharted Seas, Seeking The Beloved, Widening Circles, Immersed, Utsav, Within, Now Is, Inter_rupted and Forbidden at different venues and festivals. Her works, namely Inter_rupted and Forbidden have been co-commissioned by international theatres and dance festivals such as: Dance Umbrella, UK, Sadler's Wells, London, The National Centre for the Performing Arts, Mumbai and Esplanade - Theatres on the Bay, Singapore. She has also conducted several workshops and presented papers at dance seminars.

Mangaldas is known for choreographing works that address contemporary concerns. Through the production of Now Is (2010), she explored what it means to live creatively. In 2013, she choreographed Within, which received critical acclaim. Within was her response to the horriffic gangrape in Delhi in 2012 which has subsequently travelled to many major festivals including the Perth International Festival. Her production, Inter_rupted, that premiered in 2016, and addresses the ever disintegrating yet resilient human body, has innovative contemporary choreography with a classical idiom. In 2021, Mangaldas and her dance company presented Life in Russia at the CHEKHOV festival- that explored the meaning of life in all its magnificence. Her new production Forbidden, premiered at the NCPA on 4 December 2022 and is scheduled to travel to Sadler's Wells London in October 2023, and Esplanade – Theatres By The Bay, Singapore in November 2023. Forbidden addresses female sexuality and the cultural taboos that prevail around it.

Mangaldas has also choreographed works for the young British dancer Aakash Odedra and for her student Gauri Diwakar who has performed the two choreographies on international platforms. In June 2020 during the COVID lockdown, Mangaldas collaborated with fashion designer Sanjay Garg to make short films to raise money for artists needing support during the lockdown. She along with her dance company made many dance films to raise money for the artists, such as: Amorphous – the zero moment, WITHIN... From within, Connecting Across Space & Time, Krishna: The Melody Within and Sparsh, some of which were shown at international dance festivals including the Battery Dance Festival, New York. Her repertory members have been conducting Kathak classes for economically weaker students via the Sarvam Shakti Foundation in New Delhi and Gurgaon.

In October 2023 Mangaldas performed her post-menopausal play Forbidden for sexual pleasure at the Sadler's Wells Theatre in London was given four stars by The Guardian, who called it "a refined but radical image of a post-menopausal woman confronting oppression and embracing pleasure".

== Awards and honours ==
- Priyadarshani Award–1998
- Gujarat Sangeet Natak Academy Award –2007 (declined due to compelling reasons)
- The Sanjukta Panigrahi Award –2012
- National Sangeet Natak Akademi Award –2013 (declined due to compelling reasons)
- Nominated in the category of outstanding performance (classical) by the National Dance Critics Circle Award, (United Kingdom) –2017
- Mahari Award –2022
