= Democratic Party of Bosniaks =

Democratic Party of Bosniaks Демократска странка Бошњака Demokratska stranka Bošnjaka
- Abbreviation: DSB
- Leader: Rasim Demiri
- Founder: Azar Zulji
- Founded: December 1990
- Ideology: Islamic minority interests Bosniak minority interests
- Political position: Left-wing
- National affiliation: Vakat Coalition (Kosovo)

The Democratic Party of Bosniaks (Serbian: Демократска странка Бошњака, romanized: Demokratska stranka Bošnjaka), formerly Democratic Reform Party of Muslims (Serbian: Демократска реформска странка Муслимана, romanized: Demokratska reformska stranka Muslimana) was a left-wing Bosniak minority party in Serbia and Kosovo.

The party entered Serbian parliament in the 1990 and 1992 elections. It is now defunct.
