= Titus Munteanu =

Titus Muntean
- Born: Titus Muntean; 3 October 1941; Lugoj, Romania
- Died: 18 December 2013 (aged 72); Bucharest, Romania
- Occupation(s): Director, filmmaker, producer
- Years active: 1966–2013

Titus Munteanu (Titus-Adrian Muntean, 3 October 1941 − 18 December 2013) was a Romanian director, filmmaker and producer.

Munteanu began his television career in 1966 and was best known for his work with the broadcaster TVR 1.

In 2004, Munteanu received the Excellence Award from National Audiovisual Council (Romanian: Consiliul Național al Audiovizualului, CNA).

Titus Munteanu died of respiratory disease on 18 December 2013, aged 72, in Bucharest, Romania.
