= Yuri Kordonsky =

Russian theatre director, actor and educator (born 1966)

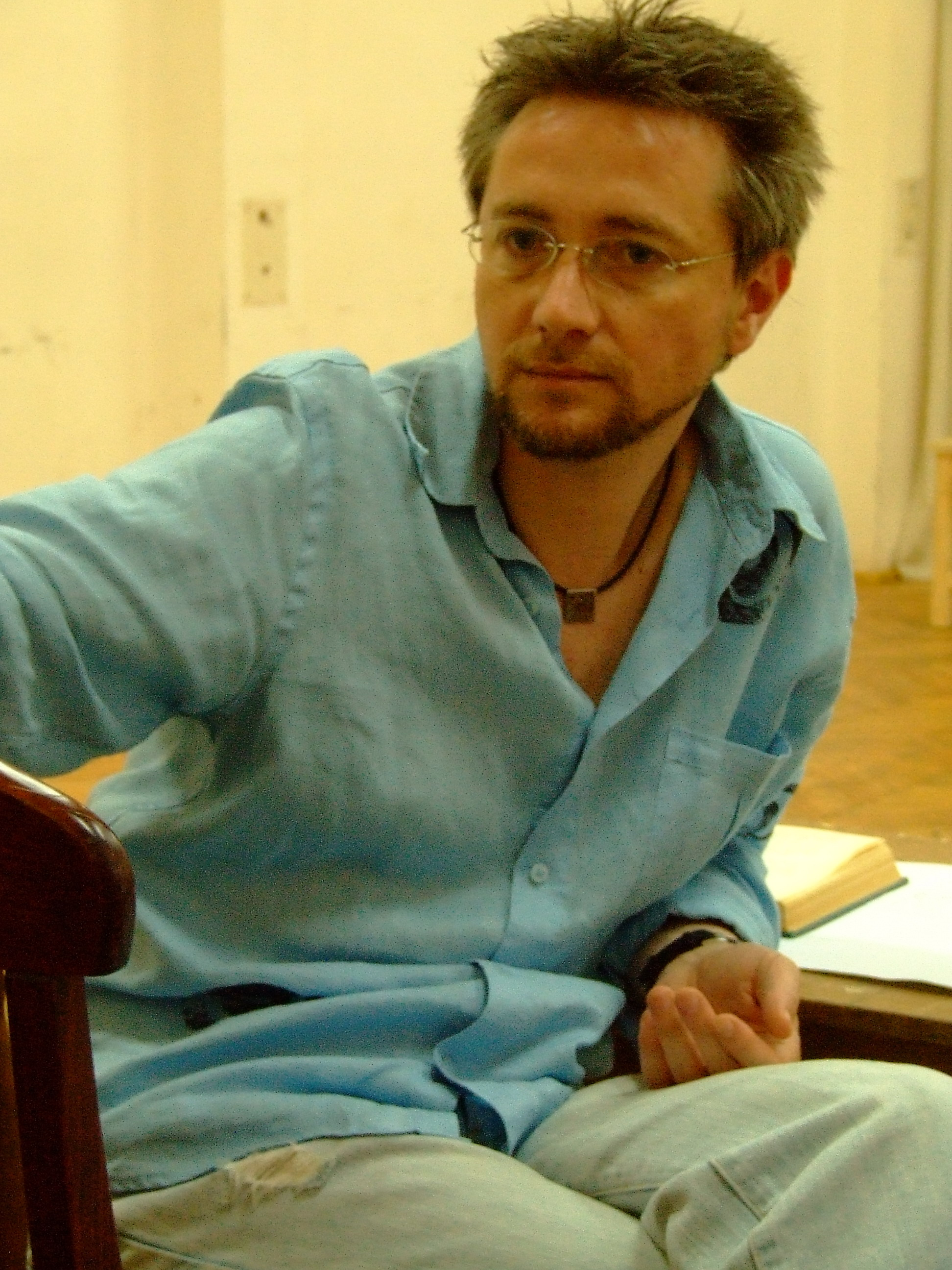

Yuri Kordonsky (Russian: Юрий Михайлович Кордонский) (born 17 October 1966, Odesa) is a theatre director, actor and educator. He is Associate Chair of Directing and Professor in the Practice of Directing at the David Geffen School of Drama at Yale University. Kordonsky has staged productions across Europe and the U.S., working frequently as a guest director with the Bulandra Theatre, the National Theatre Bucharest, the Radu Stanca National Theatre, and the Timisoara State German Theatre.

As of 2025, two of his productions remain in the active repertory of the Bulandra Theatre: Crime and Punishment and Zinky Boys.
