= Kumudini Lakhia =

Indian dancer and choreographer (1930–2025)

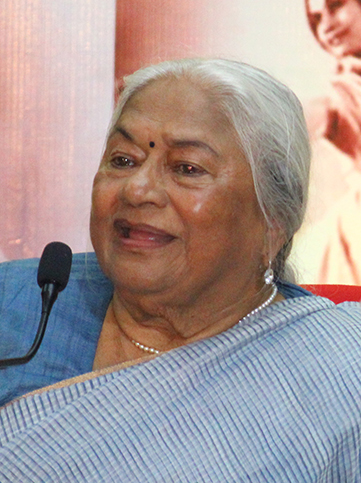
- Born: Kumudini Jayakar; 17 May 1930; Bombay, Bombay Presidency, India
- Died: 12 April 2025 (aged 94); Ahmedabad, Gujarat, India
- Occupations: Founder-Director, Kadamb School of Dance and Music (1964)
- Known for: Kathak dance and choreography
- Awards: Padma Vibhushan (2025)

Kumudini Lakhia (17 May 1930 – 12 April 2025) was an Indian Kathak dancer and choreographer based in Ahmedabad, Gujarat, where she founded Kadamb School of Dance and Music, an institute of Indian dance and music in 1964.

A pioneer in contemporary Kathak dance, she was credited with moving away from the solo form of Kathak starting in the 1960s, by turning it into a group spectacle, and also innovations like taking away traditional stories and adding contemporary storylines into Kathak repertoire.

She was awarded Sangeet Natak Akademi Award in 1982 by Sangeet Natak Akademi, India's National Akademi for Performing arts, Kalidas Samman (2002-03) and Padma Vibhushan, India's second highest civilian award in 2025.

== Early life and education ==
Born as Kumudini Jayakar in Bombay (now Mumbai), into a Maharashtrian family. Her mother, Leela Jayakar, was a professional singer who performed on All India Radio and recorded for HMV, while her father was an engineer.Lakhia started her Kathak training with Sohanlal from the Bikaner Gharana at age seven. This was followed by Ashiq Hussain of Benaras Gharana and Sunder Prasad of the Jaipur gharana of Kathak. Encouraged by her mother, Leela, herself a classical singer, she was sent to further her training under the tutelage of Radheylal Misra, himself a disciple of Jai Lal. As a result, she completed her schooling in Lahore and subsequently completed a degree in agricultural science at a university in Allahabad.

== Career ==
Lakhia started her career at age 17, dancing with noted dancer Ram Gopal as he toured the West, bringing Indian dance to the eyes of people abroad for the first time, and then became a dancer and choreographer in her own right. She learned first from various gurus of Jaipur gharana, and later she received a Government of India scholarship to learn Kathak from Shambhu Maharaj at the Shriram Bharatiya Kala Kendra in New Delhi.

She was particularly known for her multi-person choreographies. Some of her most famous choreographies include Dhabkar (Pulse), Yugal (The Duet), and Atah Kim (Where Now?), which she performed at the annual Kathak Mahotsav in Delhi in 1980. She was also a choreographer in the Hindi film, Umrao Jaan (1981), along with Gopi Krishna.

Lakhia was a guru to many disciples, including Kathak dancers Aditi Mangaldas, Vaishali Trivedi, Sandhya Desai, Daksha Sheth, Maulik Shah, Ishira Parikh, Prashant Shah, Urja Thakore, Parul Shah and Atsuko Maeda amongst others.

== Personal life and death ==
Lakhia met her future husband, Rajnikant Lakhia, while she was working with Ram Gopal's company in London. Rajnikant was then studying law at Lincoln's Inn and was also a musician who participated in the company's musical productions. The couple married in 1952 and initially settled in Bombay, and had two children, son, Shriraj, born in 1956; and a daughter, Maitreyi. Lakhia moved to Ahmedabad in 1959, where she subsequently established her teaching and choreographic career.

Lakhia died in Ahmedabad on 12 April 2025, at the age of 94.

== Choreographies ==
- "Variation in Thumri" (1969)
- "Venu Nad" (1970)
- "Bhajan" (1985)
- "Hori" (1970)
- "Kolaahal" (1971)
- "Duvidha" (1971)
- "Dhabkar" (1973)
- "Yugal" (1976)
- "Umrao Jaan" (1981)
- "Atah Kim" (1982)
- "Okha Haran" (1990)
- "Hun-Nari" (1993)
- "Golden Chains" (for Neena Gupt, London)
- "Sam Samvedan" (1993)
- "Samanvay" (2003)
- "Bhav Krida" (1999)
- "Feathered Cloth – Hagoromo" (2006)
- "Mushti" (2005)

== Awards and honours ==
- Padma Shri by the Government of India in 1987
- Padma Bhushan in 2010
- Sangeet Natak Akademi Award by Sangeet Natak Akademi in 1982
- Kalidas Samman for the year 2002-03
- Sangeet Natak Akademi Tagore Ratna by Sangeet Natak Akademi in 2011
- Guru Gopinath Desiya Natya Puraskaram (2021) by Government of Kerala
- Padma Vibhushan for year 2025 for her contribution in the field of Art

== Bibliography ==
- Movement in Stills: The Dance And Life of Kumudini Lakhia (ISBN 81-88204-42-0) by Reena Shah
- Choreography in the Indian Context by Kumudini Lakhia, (Keynote address Feb 2002)
