= Milena Kitic =

Serbian American operatic mezzo-soprano (born 1968)

Milena Kitic (Serbian: Kitić; born 1968) is a Serbian American operatic mezzo-soprano.

== Biography ==
Kitic was born in Belgrade, at the time in Yugoslavia. She graduated from the Mokranjac Music School in Belgrade. Her first professor was Anđelka Obradović. As a child, Kitic was a competitive gymnast in her native Yugoslavia.

Kitic began her professional career with the Belgrade Opera at the National Theatre in Belgrade, debuting in 1989 as Olga in Tchaikovsky's Eugene Onegin; she performed at this house for 8 years.

From 1997 until 1999, Kitic performed at the Aalto Theatre in Essen, Germany, and later toured throughout Europe. In 1998, she made her American debut and performed at Carnegie Hall that year.

In 2002, she debuted with the Washington National Opera and the Los Angeles Opera. The following year, she performed with Opera Pacific, including a benefit performance with tenor Plácido Domingo. In October 2005, she debuted with the Metropolitan Opera in New York, starring in Bizet's Carmen and as Amneris in Verdi's Aida, roles which she reprised for Opera Pacific.

Kitic teaches master classes at Chapman University, the University of Southern California's Thornton School of Music and the University of California, Irvine. Kitic was married to entrepreneur and former Yugoslav prime minister Milan Panić before the couple divorced.
