= Tsarskoselskaya Art Award =

- Awarded for: Creative contribution to the development of Russian culture and art and the strengthening of international cultural relations
- Country: Russia
- First award: 1993; 33 years ago

Tsarskoselskaya Art Award is a Russian award, given for creative contribution to the development of Russian culture and art and the strengthening of international cultural relations. In the list of the founders: National Pushkin Museum, philanthropist Boris Blotner, poet and musician Alexander Dolsky, writer Viktor Krivulin, composer Sergey Kuryokhin, film director Alexander Sokurov. Among the award winners were Mikhail Kozakov, Valentin Gaft, Sergey Yursky, Chulpan Khamatova, Galina Vishnevskaya and Eldar Ryazanov.
