= Evdokimos Tsolakidis =

- Born: 1962 (age 62–63); Thessaloniki, Greece
- Occupation(s): Actor, director, acting coach and teacher

Evdokimos Tsolakidis (Greek: Ευδόκιμος Τσολακίδης; born 1962) is a Greek actor, director, playwright, drama teacher, founder and artistic director of the Theater of Changes. In April 2010, he was elected member of the board of the Greek Center of the International Theater Institute where he is listed as Member and Stage Director.

== Education ==
He graduated from the high school of Ambelokipi in Thessaloniki. He studied at the Medical School of the University of Rome. He was awarded the diploma of the Drama School of the National Theater of Northern Greece with honors. He continued his studies in drama, acting and directing in New York City (HB Studio) funded by the U.S.A. Government (Fulbright Foundation). While in NYC he attended classes as an auditor at the Actors Studio. In 2013 he graduated from the Greek Open University BA (Humanitarian Studies, European Culture). In 2016 he got his master's degree from the Open University of Cyprus MA (Theatre Studies: Acting-Directing).

== Acting career ==
He has worked as an actor in many troupes, including the State Theater of Northern Greece, the National Theatre of Greece, the Spyros Evangelatos Auditorium, the Regional Theater of Crete and Thrace, the troupes Karezi-Kazakos, Aliki Vougiouklaki, George Kimoulis, Xenia Kalogeropoulou etc. He took part in film and television productions and directed plays in Greece and abroad.

== Teaching career ==
He is the founder and the Artistic Director of Theater of Changes (founded in 1998) where he directs plays and teaches to this day. Theater of Changes hosts each year about a thousand of students being taught by actors, directors and other artists. At the same time, Evdokimos Tsolakidis teaches systematically in Rome (International Acting School, Cinecitta) and in London (Giles Foreman Lecting Studio) as well as in Stockholm (Kulturama), in Istanbul ( Müjdat Gsezen Art Academy, SAFKM), in Tbilisi (Marjansvilli Theater), in New York City (Theaterlab), in Paris (Ecole de Théatre de Paris, TRIXTER), in Amsterdam (Easylaughs group), in Kathmandu (Dabali Theater), in İzmir (Tiyatro Terminal) as well as in different parts of Greece. . He has participated at International Theater Festivals (Romania, Iran, Switzerland and Mexico) and has taught at the Theater Department of the Universities of Alexandria in Egypt, Tehran in Iran, Ciudad del Carmen in Mexico. He was chairman of the jury of the International Theater Festival in Agadir (Morocco 2001). During summer 2016 he stayed in Santa Barbara, California teaching at the local university (UCSB) and directing Euripides' "Helen" together with his other two shows "Tonight we Improvise" and "Walking and Falling".

== International Festival of Making Theater ==
Every year since 2005, he has organized ''In.F.o.Ma.T. (International Festival of Making Theater), an international meeting of theater makers from around the world.

== Publications ==
He has published the following books: "Acting without teacher" by KOAN editions, "Improvisation in Theater" by EXANDAS editions and the plays Athens - Moscow and Nothing by Dodoni editions. Athens - Moscow has been translated into Iranian by Sakineh Arabnejad, and published by Afraz editions and was staged in Tehran, directed by Katayun Feiz-Marandi. Both plays have been staged in Zürich, directed by Anna Tsihli, "Nothing" has been translated in Turkish by Kemal Basar, has been published along with the magazine "Yeni Tiyatro" in March 2011 and has been staged in Istanbul in 2010 and in İzmir in 2010).
