= Radu Stanca National Theatre =

Theatre building in Sibiu, Romania

Coordinates: 45.7912°N 24.1494°E

The Radu Stanca National Theatre (Romanian: Teatrul Național "Radu Stanca" Sibiu, abbreviation: TNRS) is a theatre in Sibiu, Romania, which began construction in 1788. It is one of the longest-standing theatres in Romania and one of the main structures that have contributed to the rise of the Sibiu International Theatre Festival. It is presently managed by Constantin Chiriac, and it includes performances in both Romanian and German.

== History ==
In 1788, typographer Martin Hochmeister laid the foundation of a building dedicated to performances, and in one year he redesigned the function of the Thick Tower, which was part of the city's medieval fortification walls. From this point on, the German-language cultural life of the town of Sibiu started growing as city dwellers saw a varied repertory, inspired from both classical and contemporary works. Thus, the works of great authors, such as Shakespeare and Molière, or of iconic representatives of German Romanticism found success in the audience in Sibiu, whose strong interest in drama would ensure the continuity of the first theatre in Romania.

This tradition of theatre in Sibiu, which up to that point unfolded in German only, gained a new dimension in 1868, when Mihai Pascaly's group performed the first show in Romanian in Sibiu. Most likely, during this representation based on a play by Vasile Alecsandri, none other than young Mihai Eminescu hid behind the curtain in his capacity as prompter at the time. This show enjoyed such a great success that it paved the way for other Romanian theatre groups, such as the Tardini-Vlădicești Group or the one led by Matei Millo, to perform for the audience in Sibiu.

Despite a fire in 1826, the theatre resumed its activity soon after, thanks to the involvement of its founder, Martin Hochmeister. However, in 1949, another fire caused such great damage that the local administration had to move the theatre to its current location, which up to that point had functioned as a cinema. Still, this event marked a rebirth of the theatre stage in Sibiu, with Radu Stanca himself serving as a director. As an iconic member of the Sibiu Literary Circle, Radu Stanca is credited with having ensured the revival of the newly named State Theatre, whose title changed after the death of the great artist as a sign of homage to his tireless involvement in the city's cultural life.

More than two hundred years after it was established, the “Radu Stanca” National Theatre in Sibiu (TNRS) is a presence in national and international cultural life. The Sibiu International Theatre Festival, set up in 1993, has become an important performing arts event in Central and Eastern Europe. Similarly, TNRS has played a role in the granting of the title European Capital of Culture to the city of Sibiu in 2007.

== Associated structures ==
The theatre collaborates with regional cultural events and academic bodies, including the Sibiu International Theatre Festival, the Sibiu Performing Arts Market, and the Lucian Blaga University of Sibiu. Through partnerships with the university's Department of Drama and Theatre Studies and its doctoral research platform, TNRS supports academic training, research, and international exchange for performing arts professionals.

At the same time, together with these structures, TNRS has developed the Sibiu Walk of Fame, a section of the Sibiu International Theatre Festival that celebrates the most iconic names in Romanian and international theatre and film. Similarly, Fabrica de Cultură (Factory of Culture) was set up, a former industrial space turned into a complex of venues for conventional and experimental theatre and dance performances, as well as video projections, which also host some of the heritage performances of the National Theatre in Sibiu: “Faust”, “Metamorphoses”, and “The Scarlet Princess”, all of them directed by Silviu Purcărete.

The most recent TNRS project is the Digital Stage, an integrated video-on-demand platform, which comprises recorded performances or films inspired from the shows performed on the stage of the National Theatre in Sibiu or as part of the Sibiu International Theatre Festival. TNRS is the first Romanian theatre to hold such a platform.

== Tours and distinctions ==
https://www.tnrs.ro/en-tours

== Iconic performances and remarkable collaborations ==
Nowadays, the theatre has a team of permanent artists who contribute to the staging of 120 shows, in both Romanian and German. From 2001, TNRS has been on 520 national and international tours and has been invited to festivals all around the world, in Edinburgh, Avignon, New York, Brussels, Rome, Tokyo, Seoul, St. Petersburg, Moscow, Naples, Paris, Liverpool, London, Budapest, Bogota, Tampere, Poznań, Warsaw, Barcelona, Lisbon, Porto, Cairo, Yerevan, Tbilisi, Nitra, Athens, Thessaloniki, Belgrade, Varna, Lille, Tel Aviv, Omsk, and Chisinau.

With a repertory varying from Greek tragedies to innovative 21st century experiments, TNRS collaborates with notable directors from Romania and abroad, such as: Silviu Purcărete, Andrei Serban, Andriy Zholdak, Kushida Kazuyoshi, Armin Petras, Mihai Măniuțiu, Tompa Gábor, Alexandru Dabija, Yury Kordonsky, Radu Afrim, Alexander Riemenschneider, Radu Alexandru Nica, Robert Raponja, Masahiro Yasuda, Gigi Căciuleanu, Dragoș Galgoțiu, Zoltán Balázs.
