= Sumitra Charat Ram =

Indian arts patron, impresario (1914–2011)

- Born: 17 November 1914; Meerut, United Provinces
- Died: 8 August 2011 (aged 96)
- Known for: Founder Shriram Bharatiya Kala Kendra (established 1952)

Sumitra Charat Ram (17 November 1914 – 8 August 2011) was a noted Indian arts patron, impresario and the founder of Shriram Bharatiya Kala Kendra (SBKK) established in 1952. She played a key role in the revival of performing arts, especially Kathak, in the post-independence era, for which she received a Padma Shri Award.

She was the wife of industrialist Lala Charat Ram of DCM Shriram Group.

== Early life and background ==
She was born on Diwali day in 1917 to Raja Jwala Prasad and Rani Bhagyawati in Meerut in United Provinces, now in Uttar Pradesh. Her father was the Chief Engineer of Canals and Irrigation of United Province (U.P). She was the youngest of her five siblings: brothers Dharam Vira, Kanti Vira and Satya Vira, and sisters Yashoda and Sushila.

He elder brother Dharma Vira (1906–2000) joined ICS (1906–2000) and was Cabinet Secretary of the Government of India, as well as a governor of Punjab, West Bengal and Karnataka.

== Career ==
After her marriage to Lala Charat Ram, son of Lala Shri Ram, she gradually became an art patron. In 1947, upon the suggestion of Ravi Shankar, she took a loan of Rs. 10,000 from her father-in-law, and started the Jhankar Committee in Delhi. At the turn of the independence of India, princely states were abolished, which also left a large of number of musicians and dancers without patronage. Thus in the coming years, Jhankar provided patronage to leading musicians and artists of the time by organising musical concerts and dance performances. This included Siddheshwari Devi, Ravi Shankar, Hafiz Ali Khan, Baba Allaudin Khan, Shambhu Maharaj, Sunder Prasad, Birju Maharaj, Durga Lal and Aminuddin Dagar.

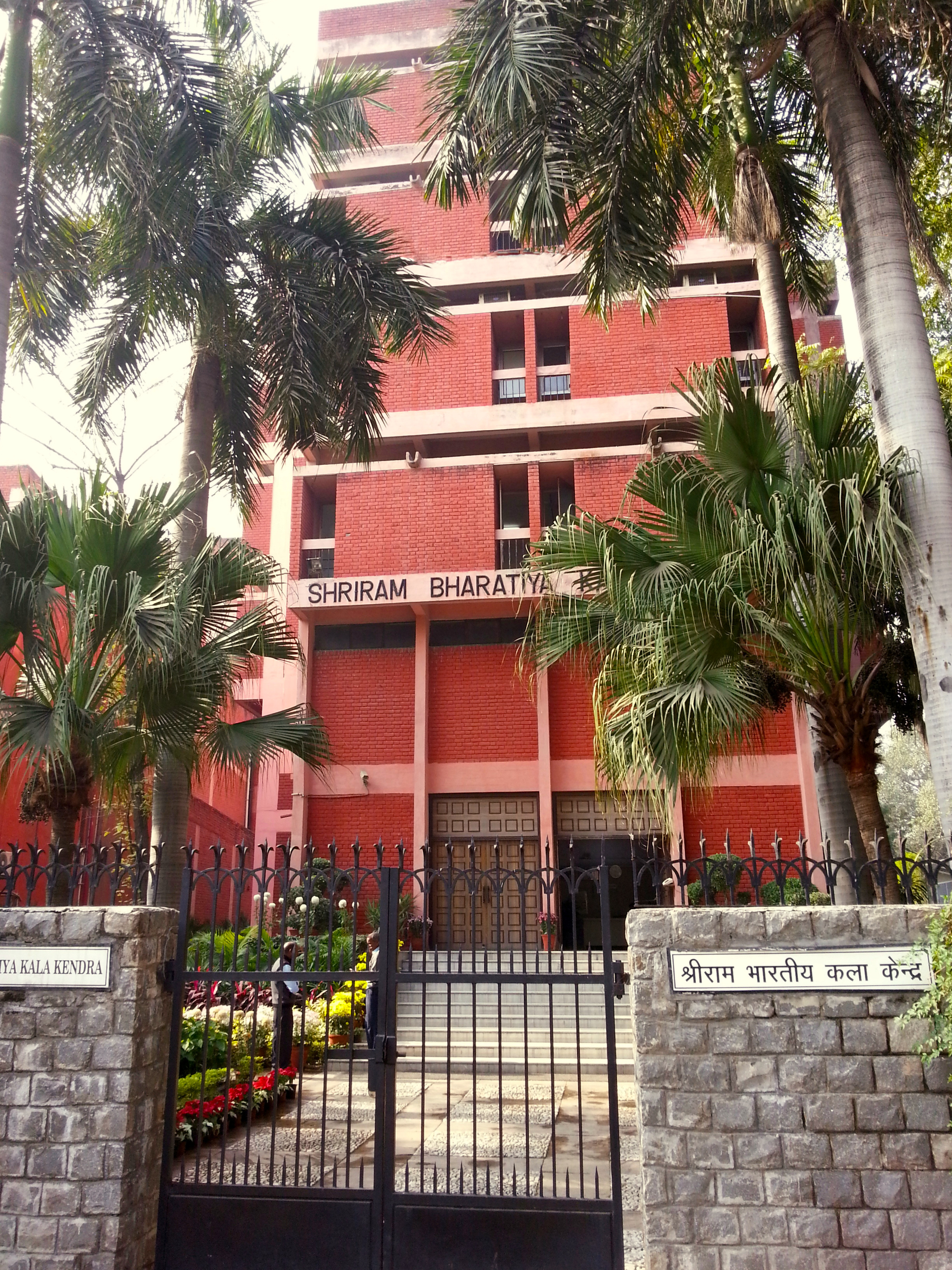
Shriram Bharatiya Kala Kendra, Delhi founded by Sumitra Charat Ram in 1952

She went on to establish Shriram Bharatiya Kala Kendra, a performing arts and music school in 1952, where noted gurus of the time were teachers, with noted classical singer Nilina Ripjit Singh, later known as Naina Devi, acting as its director. Throughout the 1950s, SBKK remained a focal point for the top dancers and musicians of the period, especially among leading gurus of Kathak gharanas, and Delhi became a centre of cultural revival as well new creative bursts in performing arts. The National Institute of Kathak Dance or Kathak Kendra was originally established as the Kathak wing of the Shriram Bharatiya Kala Kendra in 1955, and was later taken over by the Sangeet Natak Akademi, India's National Academy for Music, Dance and Drama in 1964.

In February 2011, the first 'Sumitra Charat Ram Award for Lifetime Achievement' established by Shri Ram Bhartiya Kala Kendra was awarded to Pandit Birju Maharaj .

== Awards ==
For her contributions to the arts, in 1966, she was awarded the Padma Shri Award, fourth highest civilian honours, by Government of India.

== Personal life ==
Her husband Charat Ram built companies like Shriram Pistons, Jay Engineering, Usha International and Shriram Industrial Enterprises Ltd. (SIEL). He died on 16 May 2007, at the age of 89, survived by his sons Deepak and Siddharth, and daughters Shobha and Gauri. Her father-in-law Lala Shri Ram had established educational institutions like Lady Shri Ram College (established 1956), Shri Ram College of Commerce (established 1926). Shri Ram School in Delhi, was founded by Manju Bharat Ram, wife of Arun Bharat Ram, Lala Bharat Ram's son.

She died on 8 August 2011 in New Delhi, after a brief illness at the age of 96. She was survived by her centenarian sister Sushila, and her children, grandchildren and great-grandchildren. Her daughter, Shobha Deepak Singh, continues to run Bhartiya Kala Kendra.

== Bibliography ==
- Sumitra Charat Ram (1995). The essence of memories: a collage of renowned industrialist Dr. Charat Ram's life and work. Oxford & IBH Pub. Co. ISBN 978-81-204-1042-8.
- Ashish Khokar; Sumitra Charat Ram (1998). Shriram Bharatiya Kala Kendra: a history : Sumitra Charat Ram reminisces. Lustre Press. ISBN 978-81-7436-043-4.
