= 1978 massacre at Multan Colony Textile Mills =

1978 mass killing of striking textile workers by government forces in Multan, Pakistan

- Date: 2 January 1978
- Location: Colony textile mills, Multan; 30.1346674°N 71.3709328°E:
- Goals: Bonus Payment
- Methods: Strikes, protest, demonstrations

Lead figures
Mohammad Shafi	Amir Ali

Casualties and losses
900 deaths 1600 wounded	N/A arrests

The 1978 massacre at Multan Colony Textile Mills was one of the most brutal acts of Muhammad Zia-ul-Haq's regime in Pakistan. Paramilitary forces opened fire on striking workers, resulting in 22–133 killed and many injured.

== Background ==
In 1977, the Zulfikar Ali Bhutto regime was overthrown by Muhammad Zia-ul-Haq, which unleashed new attacks on the working class and trade unions. The military dictatorship crushed left-wing activists and trade unionists and oppressed different layers of society. Violent events from mass killings of workers to genocide of peasants and youth engulfed the country. Zia implemented policies friendly to industrialists, which saw forceful imprisonment of workers, a ban on trade unions, low wages and contract labour. Nationalized industries were given back to industrialists with hefty compensation and capitalists took revenge on workers in the form of brutal repression.

Colony Textile Mills was established as a textile manufacturing unit in 1946 under Colony Group. Colony Group was founded by Mohammad Ismaeel and was divided into three divisions headed by Farooq A Sheikh, Naseer A Sheikh and Mughis A Sheikh. Colony Textile Mills was headed by the latter. It was initially established at Faisalabad but, due to competition with Delhi Cloth & General Mills of Sir Shri Ram, it shifted to Multan in the 1940s. During the 1970s, the owners of Colony Group were in the top seven industrialist families among 22 industrialist families who owned 66% of the total industrial assets, 70% of insurance and 80% of banking. This group also owned shares in newspapers and became active in politics as well. One of the division leaders, Naseer A Sheikh, was on the board of the Civil and Military Gazette and Nawa-i-Waqt while another, Farooq A Sheikh, contested elections for the national assembly in 1970. The third, Mughis A Sheikh, had a good relationship with Zia-ul-Haq, since he was a Corps Commander in Multan.

== Events ==
=== Strike ===
In 1978, Colony Textile Mills was one of the most profitable factories in Pakistan, and it employed more than 5000 workers. When workers learned that the factory had made profits, they argued that they were owed a bonus under the Labour Policy of 1972, which extended the scope of the labour laws and entitled workers to increased profit-sharing and a statutory bonus. However, the owner refused to pay the bonus. The Workers' Union furnished a strike notice to management. On the morning of 29 December 1977, workers went on complete shutdown of the factory through their peaceful strike. According to a January 3 1978 newspaper report: "Workers were demanding a three months' bonus along with one month's recreational allowance."

The mill administration agreed to pay a two months' bonus at the end of January, but workers rejected the offer and stopped working on 29 December 1977.

=== Massacre ===
On 2 January 1978, the daughter of mill owner Sheikh was getting married. The dowry of the bride was ten times higher than the bonus owed to the workers. Zia-ul-Haq was invited to attend. A rumor spread that strikers were going to attack the wedding ceremony. Zia-ul-Haq ordered the state paramilitary force to shoot workers and crush their movement. A participant of this struggle, Lal Khan, recounted the incident in his book:

The paramilitaries started firing directly at the workers who were gathering for a peaceful gate meeting. In a scene of indescribable horror workers screamed and stampeded over the bloodstained corpses of their workmates, crushing many others as they desperately tried to evade the carnage. Blood was everywhere, streaming from the bodies of the workers whose only crime was to ask for their basic rights. The firing continued uninterrupted for three hours. By six-o'clock in the evening, when darkness had set in, the state forces had 'conquered' the textile mill workers. In the factory compound and lawns the state forces had prevented the bodies of the injured from being taken to hospital. Those who tried to pick them up were hampered by the police. Dozens had died on the spot. Several injured had died due to excessive loss of blood because they were prevented from being rushed for medical treatment. In the darkness of the night the state forces, without differentiating between the dead and the injured, brought up trucks and threw the bodies into them. Some were thrown in the huge factory gutter, while others were buried without coffins in the nearby village of Bagasher. In spite of the terror of this ruthless state, hundreds of workers and students (including the author) kept on taking the injured to the hospitals and tried to save the lives of as many workers as possible. Later on an effort was made to remove the bodies of the workers from the gutter and place them elsewhere, in order to arrange for their proper burial with their comrades and relatives present.

While official and press reports stated that some 13 to 22 people were killed, unofficial estimates put the total number as high as 150–200. Similarly, the Workers Action Committee estimated 133 killed and more than 400 injured.

== Aftermath ==
After this massacre, the Workers Action Committee emerged and led mass protests against this incident. This sparked a nationwide protest and a No work day was observed by trade unions across Pakistan on 9 and 10 January 1978. Prominent politicians like Nusrat Bhutto, Wali Khan, Nawabzada Nasrullah Khan and others strongly condemned the military regime. On 4 January 1978, the Martial Law administrator of Multan ordered an inquiry. S.H.O Raja Khizer Hayat and police constable Hakim Ali were arrested and tried in a military court. Compensation of Rs 10,000 was provided to the killed workers' heirs by the owner of the mill. Prominent leaders of the Workers Action Committee also were arrested and prosecuted.
