= Shobha Deepak Singh =

Indian cultural impresario (born 1943)

- Born: 21 October 1943 (age 82); New Delhi, India
- Occupations: Cultural impresario Photographer; Writer
- Years active: 1963–Present
- Known for: Shriram Bharatiya Kala Kendra
- Spouse: Deepak Singh
- Children: One daughter
- Parent(s): Lala Charat Ram; Sumitra Charat Ram
- Awards: Padma Shri
- Website: Official website

Shobha Deepak Singh (born 21 October 1943) is an Indian cultural impresario, photographer, writer, classical dancer and the director of Shriram Bharatiya Kala Kendra, a Delhi-based cultural organization which promotes music and performing arts, through its schools and stage shows. She is known for her contributions for the revival of Mayurbhanj Chhau, a tribal martial dance form from Odisha. The Government of India awarded her the fourth highest civilian award of the Padma Shri in 1999, for her contributions to Arts and culture.

== Biography ==
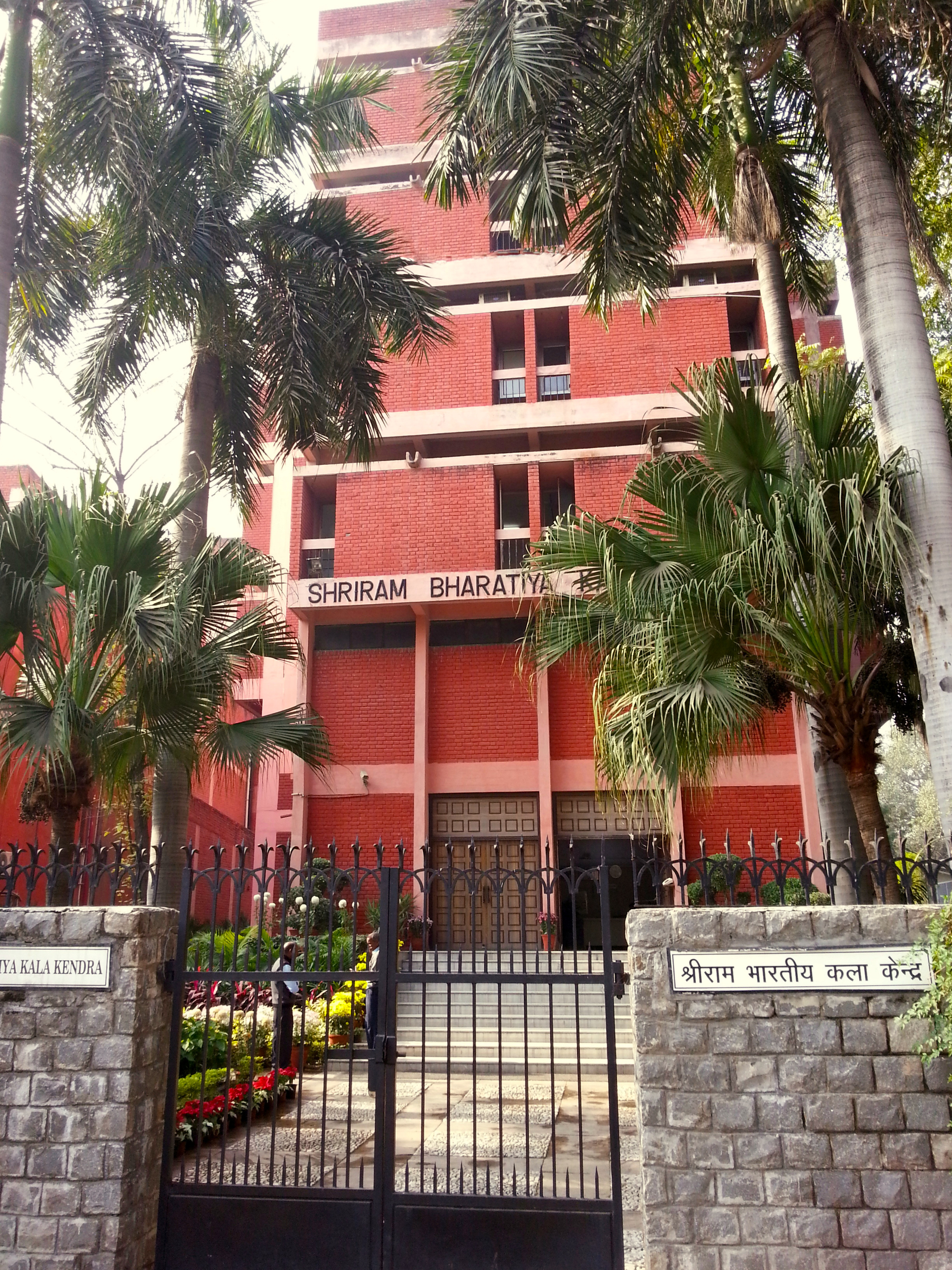
Shriram Bharatiya Kala Kendra.

Shobha was born to Lala Charat Ram of DCM and Sumitra Charat Ram, the renowned art doyenne and Padma Shri winner, on 21 October 1943, in the Indian capital of New Delhi. After completing her schooling at Modern School, New Delhi, she graduated in Economics with honours from Delhi University in 1963, to start her career as a management trainee at her father's company, Delhi Cloth & General Mills, in 1964. Four years later, subsequent to her marriage to Deepak Singh in 1967, she left DCM and joined Shriram Bharatiya Kala Kendra (SBKK), a cultural organization founded by her mother in 1952. While managing the Kamini Auditorium of the Kendra, she pursued her studies to secure the degree of Bachelor of Performing Arts and studied dance under Shambhu Maharaj and Birju Maharaj and Music under Biswajit Roy Chowdhury and Amjad Ali Khan.

In 1992, she joined Living Theatre of Ebrahim Alkazi, former director of the National School of Drama and one of the most influential figures of modern Indian theatre, and studied theatre direction, securing a diploma in 1996. She continued her association with Alkazi and worked as his assistant in four of Alkazi's productions namely, Three Sisters, Three Greek Tragedies, A Streetcar Named Desire, and Death of a Salesman. After the death of Sumitra Charat Ram in 2011, she took over the management of SBKK as its director and runs the activities of the Kendra, aided by her husband.

Singh, a recipient of the 1999 Padma Shri honours, lives in New Delhi with her husband, Deepak Singh, and the couple has a daughter.

== Legacy ==
One of the more significant contributions of Singh is her activities under the aegis of SBKK which runs the College of Music and Dance, offering courses in Hindustani classical music in Vocals and instruments, Light music vocals and dance disciplines such as Kathak, Bharatnatyam, Odissi, Mayurbhanj Chhau, Indian Ballet and Indian Contemporary Dance. Several renowned artists and art teachers like Ravi Shankar, Birju Maharaj, Amjad Ali Khan, Shambhu Maharaj and Shovana Narayan are associated with the organization. She is the organizer of Summer Ballet Festival, an annual dance festival, conducted in New Delhi. She has also instituted an annual award, Sumitra Charat Ram Award for Lifetime Achievement, to honour excellence in Art, Birju Maharaj receiving the inaugural award in 2011

Singh is an accomplished photographer, covering many of the functions of SBKK personally. She is reported to have exposed over 40,000 films, covering dance, theatre and music. Her first solo exhibition was organized by Ebrahim Alkazi at Shridharani Art Gallery in 1996. Since then, she has exhibited her works at various places, including the Triveni Kala Sangam, New Delhi and the Nehru Centre, London (2011). In 2013, Alka Pande curated her exhibition, displaying 250 of Singh's works at the India Habitat Centre on 25 March 2013 where a book, Dancescapes: A Photographic Journey, composed of 70 photographs, was released. She has also written a book on Indian theatre, under the title, Theatre Escapes: Experiencing Rasas.

== Bibliography ==
- Shobha Deepak Singh (2013). Dancescapes: A Photographic Journey. Roli Books. ISBN 978-8174369611.
- Shobha Deepak Singh (2014). Theatre Escapes: Experiencing Rasas. Kaveri Books. ISBN 978-9383098347.

== See also ==
- Shriram Bharatiya Kala Kendra
- Sumitra Charat Ram
- Mayurbhanj Chhau
- Ebrahim Alkazi
- Shambhu Maharaj
- Birju Maharaj
- Biswajit Roy Chowdhury
- Amjad Ali Khan
- Ravi Shankar
- Shovana Narayan
