= Manju Bharat Ram =

Indian educationist

- Born: 29 December 1945
- Died: 12 December 2012 (aged 66)
- Education: Frank Anthony Public School(Delhi) and Institute of Home Economics
- Known for: Philanthropy and setting up The Shri Ram Schools and SRF Vidyalaya
- Spouse: Arun Bharat Ram
- Children: Ashish Bharat Ram, Kartik Bharat Ram and Vasavi Bharat Ram
- Awards: 'Priyadarshini Award 1989', Karamveer Puraskar, 'Padma Shri Award 2013'

Manju Bharat Ram (29 December 1945 – 12 December 2012) was an Indian educationist, who was the founder, chairperson of the managing committee and member of the board of trustees of The Shri Ram Schools, New Delhi; ranked as India's No. 1 day school by Education World’s Schools survey in 2008, 2009 and 2011.

She was the wife of Arun Bharat Ram, a well-known businessman and currently the chairman of SRF Limited. Hailing from a middle-class family, her father, M.P. Gupta is an entrepreneur while it was after her mother Usha Gupta that the now famous FMCG brand Usha was named.

Actively involved in a host of philanthropic activities in the fields of education, she had, through The Shri Ram Schools, laid great emphasis on inclusiveness by keeping 10 per cent of seats for children with special needs. She had also ensured that there were specialised teachers employed to help these children overcome their handicaps and that later on the children were subsequently main streamed in regular classes. The school collaborates with many international corresponding schools from Singapore; the United States; the U.K; China; Germany and France to learn the best practices followed internationally. She was awarded the Padma Shri by Government of India in 2013.

== Career ==
She was the Chairperson – SRF Vidyalaya, Manali, Chennai and was instrumental in setting up this school to serve the villages around Manali and Tiruvallur. Since 1991, the school has dedicated itself to delivering quality education to children aged 3 to 14.

She had served as the trustee and honorary general secretary of the Blind Relief Association since 1968. It has a school for 300 visually challenged boys, a technical training centre, a Post-Graduate Teacher Training Institute for the Blind, computer centre, and a sheltered workshop.

As the chairperson of the Indian Blind Sports Association till 2002, she helped to organise sports events annually for the visually challenged on a national scale. Apart from that she had been affiliated to the International Blind Sports Association and recognised by the Olympic Association of India and affiliated to Para-Olympic Committee of India.

Mrs. Manju Bharat Ram was also the president of the managing committee of the J.P.M. School for the Blind, Delhi until 2011.

In 1998 she became a member of the board of governors – Kendriya Vidyalaya Sangathan; a premier organisation in India administering over 843 Schools known as 'Kendriya Vidyalayas' with 742,000 students and 47,000 employees on rolls.

She had also been associated with the following organisations;

- Founder Chairperson of Managing Committee of The Shri Ram School, Aravali – DLF City, Phase IV, Gurgaon
- Member of board of governors of Lady Shri Ram College for Women, New Delhi
- Member – board of governors of Lady Irwin College, New Delhi – May 2003 to May 2005
- Chairperson of Early Enhancement Education Program – Institute for Early Childhood Teacher Training
- Member of Round Table on School Education set up by Ministry of HRD
- Member of sub-group of setting up 2500 schools through PPP Model under the chairmanship of adviser to Dy. Chairman, planning commission
- Chairperson and founder Shriram Educare, a non-profit consultancy, aimed at facilitating transformation of school education towards providing relevant competencies for the future.
- Founder member of Pratham Delhi, Education Initiative Trust Board – A voluntary body set up to ensure "every child in school…… and is learning well". Since 9 years of its inception 160,000 children have become literate.
- Founder member Charity Aid Foundation, India (CAF) from 1998 for 8 years – Set up as part of the CAF International network. In India its mission is to increase the flow of resources from individuals and companies to the voluntary sector, through a host of services.
- President, FICCI Ladies Organization (FLO), New Delhi – March 1986 to April 1987. Since then a Member of the Governing Body, in her capacity as the past president of FLO: a national forum of women, helped organise lectures, workshops and seminars for development of women entrepreneurs.
- Member of the National Committee of Confederation of Indian Industries for Social Development and Community Affairs, in 1998.
- Member of the National Sub-Committee of Education and Literacy of the Confederation of Indian Industries, since 1996.
- Member of the Governing Body of the S.C.E.R.T., Delhi
- Member of the Governing Body of the Lawrence Lovedale School, Nilgiri's, Tamil Nadu till 1998.
- Member of Board of Governors – AISEC, Delhi till 2000.
- Chairperson of the Managing Committee of Anglo Sanskrit Victoria Jubilee School, Delhi, 1998 –1999.
- Chairperson of the Managing Committee of Commercial Senior Secondary School, Delhi, 1998 – 1999.
- Member of CII's Sub-committee on Disability until 2010.
- Member of CII's Sub-committee on Women Empowerment until 2009.
- Member, Core Group CII & MHRD Collaboration to strengthen the Vocational Education Programme in Government Schools-2000.
- Guild of Service, Chennai – Member of Governing Body from 1973 to 1981.
- Delhi Tuberculosis Association – Member of Executive Body – resigned in March 1992.
- Delhi Red Cross Association – Member of Executive Body – 1986 to 1988.
- Delhi Leprosy Society – vice-president – 1984 to 1985.
- Member of the executive body, Delhi of Bhartiya Rural Women's Co-operative from 1983 to 1985.
- Member of the committee set up by Ministry of Social Justice & Empowerment to develop guidelines for sheltered workshops for persons with severe disability in Feb. 2000.
- Lucknow Initiative with CAF & CII: Started a pilot project in Lucknow in collaboration with DPEP – U.P. to improve the infrastructure of government schools, as well as in teacher training, and increasing community participation in the running of the schools.
- Member of the board of management of Jan Shikshan Sansthan (Institute of People's Education) Delhi, Ministry of HRD & Prayas, Department of Elementary Education & Literacy from June 2000 to 2003
- Member trustee of SRF Foundation.
- Founding member and have been instrumental in setting up of the Shri Ram Police Public School at Bhondsi for police wards.
- Founding member of the Sarvepalli Radhakrishnan School at Bhiwani as a Lab School for State of Haryana by extending support of 'The Shri Ram School' to the Haryana Education Board.
- Trustee of the board of Blind Relief Association (B.R.A.). Member of Executive Body from 1969 to 1972. Honorary general secretary from 1982 to 2012.
- Member of the board of Save the Children, India until 2012
- Member of the board of directors of the National Handicapped Finance and Development Cooperation (Ministry of Social Justice and Empowerment)
- Member of the selection committee for National Awards for Master Craftsmen in Handicrafts and Handloom, Ministry of Textiles, Government of India from 1991 for over 10 years.
- Vice-President, Craft Council of India, Chennai from 1982 to 1993.
- Founded the Delhi Chapter of Craft Council of India in 1982.
- Honorary general secretary, Delhi Crafts Council from 1982 to 1991
- Had been deeply involved in promoting Handicrafts & Handlooms and was vice-president, Crafts Council of India, Delhi during 1991–1993.
- Consultant, Handicrafts and Handlooms Export Corporation of India Ltd., New Delhi from 1982 to 1983.
- Member of the Governing Body of the Lalit Kala Akademi from 1989 to 1993.
- Member of the Implementation Committee of National Centre for Textile Design (Ministry of Handlooms & Textiles, Govt. of India) – Since December 2005 to December 2012
- Member of the Governing Body of Gandharva Mahavidyalaya until 1993.
- Chairperson of Natya Tarangam; Raja and Radha Reddy's school for dancing until 2001.
- Member of Committee of Central Scheme of Financial Assistance for Promotion and Dissemination of Tribal and Folk Art and Culture set up by the Ministry of Human Resource of the Government of India – 1988 to 1993.
- Member of Expert Committee on Tourism from 1988 to 1990; The Associated Chambers of Commerce and Industry of India (ASSOCHAM)
- ASSOCHAM – Member of Expert Committees on Family and Social Welfare and Social Responsibility and Rural Reconstruction – 1990 to 1991.
- ASSOCHAM – Co-Chairperson of the committee on 'Forum for Women in Business', from 1991 to 1997.
- Member of Committee of Central Scheme of Financial Assistance for Promotion and Dissemination of Tribal and Folk Art and Culture set up by the Ministry of Human Resource of the Government of India from 1988 to 1993.
- Member of a sub-group 'Craftsmen's Perspective' of the task force committee on Handicrafts for the 8th Five Year Plan set up by the Development Commissioner (Handicrafts), Ministry of Textiles.
- Member of the working group – Kalakshetra Society, Chennai, an institute founded by Rukmani Devi Arundale, 1990 to 1993.
- Member of the advisory committee for the Indian National Trust for Art and Cultural Heritage (INTACH)
- Member of the governing board of Bharti Foundation from 2006 to 2012
- Trustee of the Bharti Foundation Trust.
- Member of the board of directors of the National Handicapped Finance and Development Cooperation (Ministry of Social Justice and Empowerment), Red Cross Bhavan, Sector 12, Faridabad, Haryana.
- Member of the Board of LEAD International from May 2004 to 2010 – A global organisation committed to Sustainable Development through capacity building and issue-oriented action projects.

== Papers presented ==
- Pan Asian Women's Congress – Tashkent, USSR – 'Women and Development: Women's Contribution to the Maintenance of Peace’ – 1986.
- World Congress of Women – Moscow 1987 – ‘Problems of Development and Women’.
- 11th Asian Crafts Council Meet 1987, Pakistan – ‘Women in Crafts in India’.
- ‘Crafts and Tourism’ – for the Expert Committee on Tourism of ASSOCHAM in August 1989.
- ‘A Vision for 2000 – Will Privatisation Provide the Answer?’ paper presented at the National Workshop: Corporate Sector in Primary Education; towards an action plan organised by Confederation of Indian Industries – November 1995.
- ‘Vision for Education in the next 50 years’ – August 1997 for Confederation of Indian Industries’ golden jubilee celebrations of India's independence.
- Keynote address at PHDCCI – ‘Literacy Awareness Amongst Industrial Workers in Delhi – Need of the Hour’ – June 1997.
- ‘Social Development and the Corporate Sector’ – paper presented to Confederation of Indian Industries’ National Committee on SDCA, Calcutta – December 1997.
- ‘Industry Perspective in Literacy’ – paper presented at 2nd Asian Regional Literacy Forum – Innovation and Professionalization in Adult Literacy. A focus on Diversity – Delhi, February 1998.
- ‘Redefining the Role of Education – Setting a New Agenda’ – Seminar held by Indian Council of Secondary Education (I.C.S.E.) on Education for a New World order – August 1998.
- Paper presented –Quality School Education-The Way Forward – A Million Good Schools now. CII Northern Region – Nov.’04 – Chandigarh – on ‘The Responsibility of School Systems’
- Paper presented on ‘T.Q.M. in Education – Our Initiative,’ at Confederation of Indian Industries. T.Q.M. Summit – December 1998.
- World Economic Forum 1998 – India Economic Summit – ‘The Priority for India’s Future – Primary School Education’.
- Confederation of Indian Industries’ Social Summit, December 1998 – ‘Corporate Initiatives in Education.’
- Paper presented at UNDP's workshop – ‘Spirit of Volunteering’ – December 1999.
- Paper on ‘Development in CSR in South Asia – Involvement in Education in India’. This was in Bhopal Aug.’04 for Inter Cohort Meet – LEAD India.

== Awards received ==
- President's Award for continuous contribution especially in the field of education & social responsibility received from Confederation of Indian Industry in 2003
- FLO (FICCI LADIES ORGANISATION) Award in Recognition of 'Exemplary Leadership' 2004.
- Karamveer Puraskar awarded by ICONGO – Indian Confederation of NGOs.
- Awarded the Padma Shri posthumously in 2013 for her contribution in the field of social work
