= Anshula Kant =

MD & CFO World Bank

Managing Director of the World Bank Group
- Incumbent
- Assumed office October 7, 2019
- President: David Malpass; Ajay Banga
- Preceded by: Kristalina Georgieva (Chief Executive)

Managing Director of State Bank of India
- In office 7 September 2018 – 31 August 2019
- Preceded by: B. Sriram
- Succeeded by: P. K. Gupta

Personal details
- Born: 7 September 1960 (age 66) Roorkee, Uttar Pradesh (present day Uttarakhand), India
- Education: Lady Shri Ram College (BA); Delhi School of Economics (MA); Delhi University

Anshula Kant (born 7 September 1960) is an Indian economist and banker who is currently serving as the chief financial officer and managing director of the World Bank Group, appointed on 12 July 2019. She is from Roorkee, India.

== Early life ==
Kant was born on September 7, 1960, in Roorkee, India in a Hindu family. In 1981, Kant completed her master's in economics from Delhi School of Economics and her bachelor's in economics from Lady Sri Ram College for Women in 1979, both of Delhi University. At the Indian Institute of Bankers, she is a Certified Associate.

== Career ==
In 1983, Kant joined the State Bank of India (SBI) as a probationary officer. She became the chief general manager of SBI (Maharashtra and Goa), deputy managing director of operations for National Banking Group, and chief executive officer of SBI (Singapore). In September 2018, she became the managing director of SBI for a period of two years, and a member of the bank's board.

On 12 July 2019, she was appointed as the chief financial officer and managing director of the World Bank Group, and will be responsible for the balance sheet and financial and risk management. On January 26, 2023, it was announced that Kant will lead, alongside World Bank Senior Managing Axel van Trotsenburg, the Evolution Roadmap exercise aimed at exploring how the World Bank Group can better respond to the need for increased action to address the growing crisis of poverty and economic distress, and global challenges, including climate change, pandemic risks, and rising fragility and conflict.

== Personal life ==
Kant is married to Sanjay Kant, a chartered accountant from Varanasi, Uttar Pradesh. She has a son, Siddharth, and a daughter, Nupur.
