= Sujata Sahu =

Sujata Sahu may refer to:

- Sujata Sahu (social entrepreneur)
- Sujata Sahu (politician)
