= Fluorochemical industry =

Industry dealing with chemicals from fluorine

The global market for chemicals from fluorine was about US$16 billion per year as of 2006. The industry was predicted to reach 2.6 million metric tons per year by 2015. The largest market is the United States. Western Europe is the second largest. Asia Pacific is the fastest growing region of production. China in particular has experienced significant growth as a fluorochemical market and is becoming a producer of them as well. Fluorite mining (the main source of fluorine) was estimated in 2003 to be a $550 million industry, extracting 4.5 million tons per year.

Mined fluorite is separated into two main grades, with about equal production of each. Acidspar is at least 97% CaF_{2}; metspar is much lower purity, 60–85%. (A small amount of the intermediate, ceramic, grade is also made.) Metspar is used almost exclusively for iron smelting. Acidspar is primarily converted to hydrofluoric acid (by reaction with sulfuric acid). The resultant HF is mostly used to produce organofluorides and synthetic cryolite.

Fluorine industry supply chain: major sources, intermediates and applications. Click for links to related articles.

== Inorganic fluorides ==
About 3 kg (6.6 lb) of metspar grade fluorite, added directly to the batch, are used for every metric ton of steel made. The fluoride ions from CaF_{2} lower the melt's temperature and viscosity (make the liquid runnier). The calcium content has a tangential benefit in removing sulfur and phosphorus, but other additives such as lime are still needed. Metspar is similarly used in cast iron production and for other iron-containing alloys.

Fluorite of the acidspar grade is used directly as an additive to ceramics and enamels, glass fibers and clouded glass, and cement, as well as in the outer coating of welding rods. Acidspar is primarily used for making hydrofluoric acid, which is a chemical intermediate for most fluorine-containing compounds. Significant direct uses of HF include pickling (cleaning) of steel, cracking of alkanes in the petrochemical industry, and etching of glass.

Aluminium smelting process: cryolite (a fluoride) is required to dissolve aluminum oxide.

One third of HF (one sixth of mined fluorine) is used to make synthetic cryolite (sodium hexafluoroaluminate) and aluminium trifluoride. These compounds are used in the electrolysis of aluminium by the Hall–Héroult process. About 23 kg (51 lb) are required for every metric ton of aluminium. These compounds are also used as a flux for glass.

Fluorosilicates are the next most significant inorganic fluorides formed from HF. The most common one, that of sodium, is used for water fluoridation, as an intermediate for synthetic cryolite and silicon tetrafluoride, and for treatment of effluents in laundries.

MgF_{2} and, to a lesser extent, other alkaline earth difluorides are specialty optical materials. Magnesium difluoride is widely used as an antireflection coating for spectacles and optical equipment. The compound is also a component in newly devised constructions (negative index metamaterials) which are the subject of "invisibility" research. The layered structures can curve light around objects.

Other inorganic fluorides made in large quantities include cobalt difluoride (for organofluorine synthesis), nickel difluoride (electronics), lithium fluoride (a flux), sodium fluoride (water fluoridation), potassium fluoride (flux), and ammonium fluoride (various). Sodium and potassium bifluorides are significant to the chemical industry.

== Fluorocarbons ==
Making organic fluorides is the main use for hydrofluoric acid, consuming over 40% of it (over 20% of all mined fluorite). Within organofluorides, refrigerant gases are still the dominant segment, consuming about 80% of HF. Even though chlorofluorocarbons are widely banned, the replacement refrigerants are often other fluorinated molecules. Fluoropolymers are less than one quarter the size of refrigerant gases in terms of fluorine usage, but are growing faster. Fluorosurfactants are a small segment in mass but are significant economically because of very high prices.

=== Gases ===
Traditionally chlorofluorocarbons (CFCs) were the predominant fluorinated organic chemical. CFCs are identified by a system of numbering that explains the amount of fluorine, chlorine, carbon and hydrogen in the molecules. The term Freon has been colloquially used for CFCs and similar halogenated molecules, though strictly speaking this is just a DuPont brand name, and many other producers exist. Brand neutral terminology is to use "R" as the prefix. Prominent CFCs included R-11 (trichlorofluoromethane), R-12 (dichlorodifluoromethane), and R-114 (1,2-dichlorotetrafluoroethane).

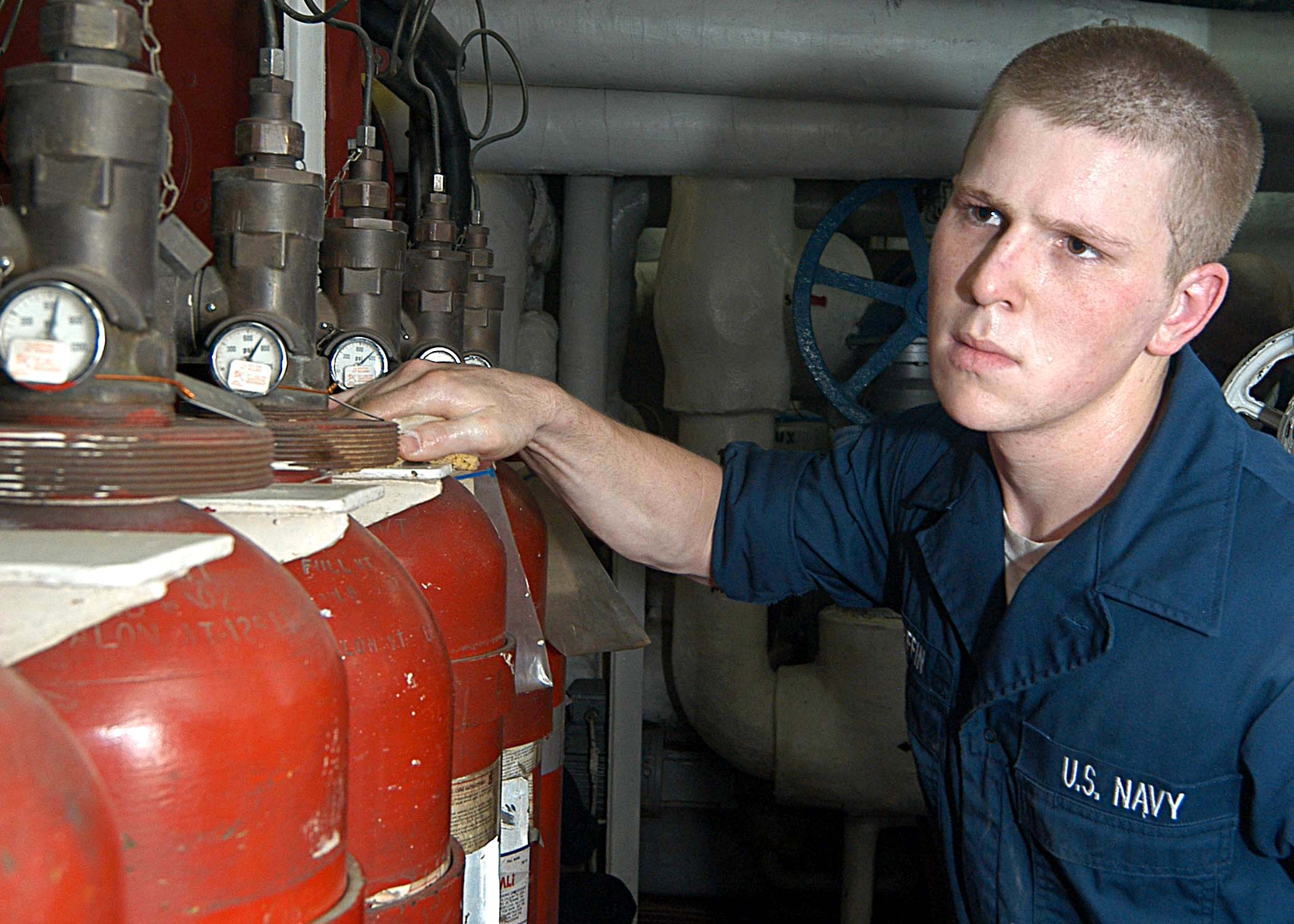
A Halon fire suppression system in a ship's machinery room

Production of CFCs grew strongly through the 1980s, primarily for refrigeration and air conditioning but also for propellants and solvents. Since the end use of these materials is banned in most countries, this industry has shrunk dramatically. By the early 21st century, production of CFCs was less than 10% of the mid-1980s peak, with remaining use primarily as an intermediate for other chemicals. The banning of CFCs initially depressed the overall demand for fluorite but 21st century production of the source mineral has recovered to 1980s levels.

Hydrochlorofluorocarbons (HCFCs) and hydrofluorocarbons (HFCs) now serve as replacements for CFC refrigerants; few were commercially manufactured before 1990. Currently more than 90% of fluorine used for organics goes into these two classes (in about equal amounts). Prominent HCFCs include R-22 (chlorodifluoromethane) and R-141b (1,1-dichloro-1-fluoroethane). The main HFC is R-134a (1,1,1,2-tetrafluoroethane).

A bromofluoroalkane, "Halon" (bromotrifluoromethane) is still widely used in ship and aircraft gaseous fire suppression systems. Because Halon production has been banned since 1994, systems are dependent on the pre-ban stores and on recycling.

A new type of fluorinated refrigerant planned to replace the high Global Warming Potential HFC compounds are hydrofluoroolefins (HFOs).

=== Fluoropolymers ===
Fluoropolymers are less than 0.1% of all polymers produced in terms of weight. Compared to other polymers, they are more expensive and their consumption is growing at a higher rate. As of about 2006–2007, estimates of the global fluoropolymer production varied from over 100,000 to 180,000 metric tons per year. Yearly revenue estimates ranged from over $2.5 billion to over $3.5 billion.

Polytetrafluoroethylene (PTFE) is 60–80% of the world's fluoropolymer production on a weight basis. The term Teflon is sometimes used generically for the substance, but is a Chemours Company and Dupont brand name—other PTFE producers exist and Chemours sometimes uses the Teflon brand for other materials. PTFE gets its fluorine without the need for fluorine gas: chloroform (trichloromethane) is treated with HF to make chlorodifluoromethane (R-22, an HCFC); this chemical when heated makes tetrafluoroethylene (abbreviated TFE), the monomer of PTFE.

The largest application for PTFE is in electrical insulation. It is an excellent dielectric and very chemically stable. It is also used extensively in the chemical process industry where corrosion resistance is needed: in coating pipes, in tubing, and gaskets. Another major use is architectural fabric (PTFE-coated fiberglass cloth used for stadium roofs and such). The major consumer application is non-stick cookware.

Major PTFE applications

PTFE dielectric separating core and outer metal in a specialty coaxial cable

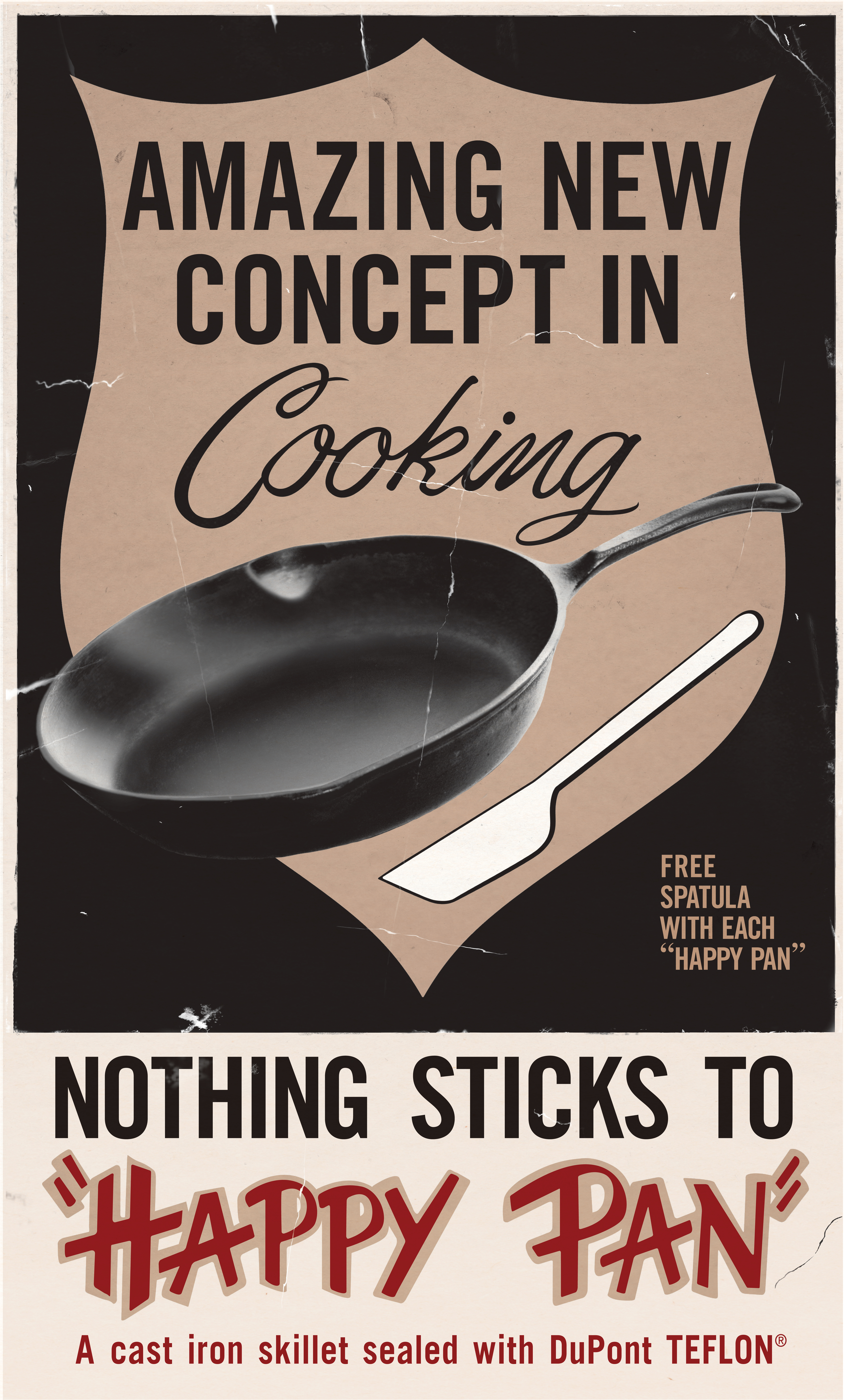
First Teflon branded frying pan, 1961

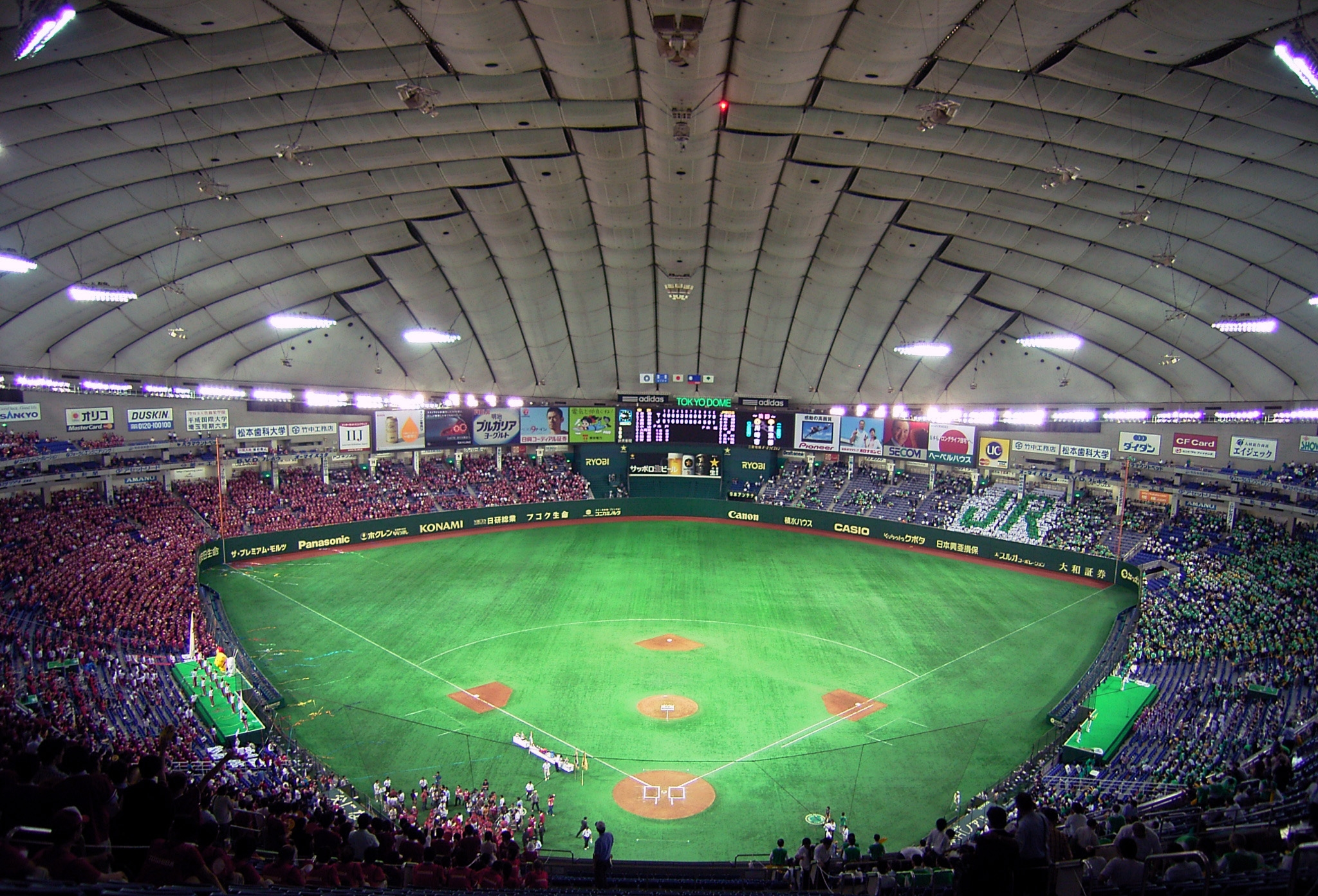
The interior of the Tokyo Dome. The roof is PTFE-coated fiberglass and air-supported.

When stretched with a jerk, a PTFE film makes a fine-pored membrane: expanded PTFE (ePTFE). The term "Gore-Tex" is sometimes used generically for this material, but that is a specific brand name. W. L. Gore & Associates is not the only producer of ePTFE and furthermore "Gore-Tex" often refers to more complicated multi-layer membranes or laminated fabrics. ePTFE is used in rainwear, protective apparel and liquids and gas filters. PTFE can also be formed into fibers which are used in pump packing seals and bag house filters for industries with corrosive exhausts.

Other fluoropolymers tend to have similar properties to PTFE—high chemical resistance and good dielectric properties—which leads to use in the chemical process industry and electrical insulation. They are easier to work with (to form into complex shapes), but are more expensive than PTFE and have lower thermal stability. Fluorinated ethylene propylene (FEP) is the second most produced fluoropolymer. Films from two fluoropolymers serve as glass-replacements in solar cells.

Fluorinated ionomers (polymers that include charged fragments) are expensive, chemically resistant materials used as membranes in certain electrochemical cells. Nafion, developed in the 1960s, was the first example and remains the most prominent material in the class. The initial Nafion application was as a fuel cell material in spacecraft. Since then, the material has been transforming the 55 million tons per year chloralkali industry; it is replacing hazardous mercury-based cells with membrane cells that are also more energy efficient. While older technology plants continue to run, new plants typically use membrane cells. By 2002, more than a third of the global capacity for the industry was membrane-cell based. Proton exchange membrane (PEM) fuel cells may be installed into vehicles.

Fluoroelastomers are rubber-like substances that are composed of crosslinked mixtures of fluoropolymers. Viton is a prominent example. Chemical-resistant O-rings are the primary application. Fluoroelastomers tend to be more stiff than conventional elastomers, but with superior chemical and heat resistance.

=== Surfactants ===
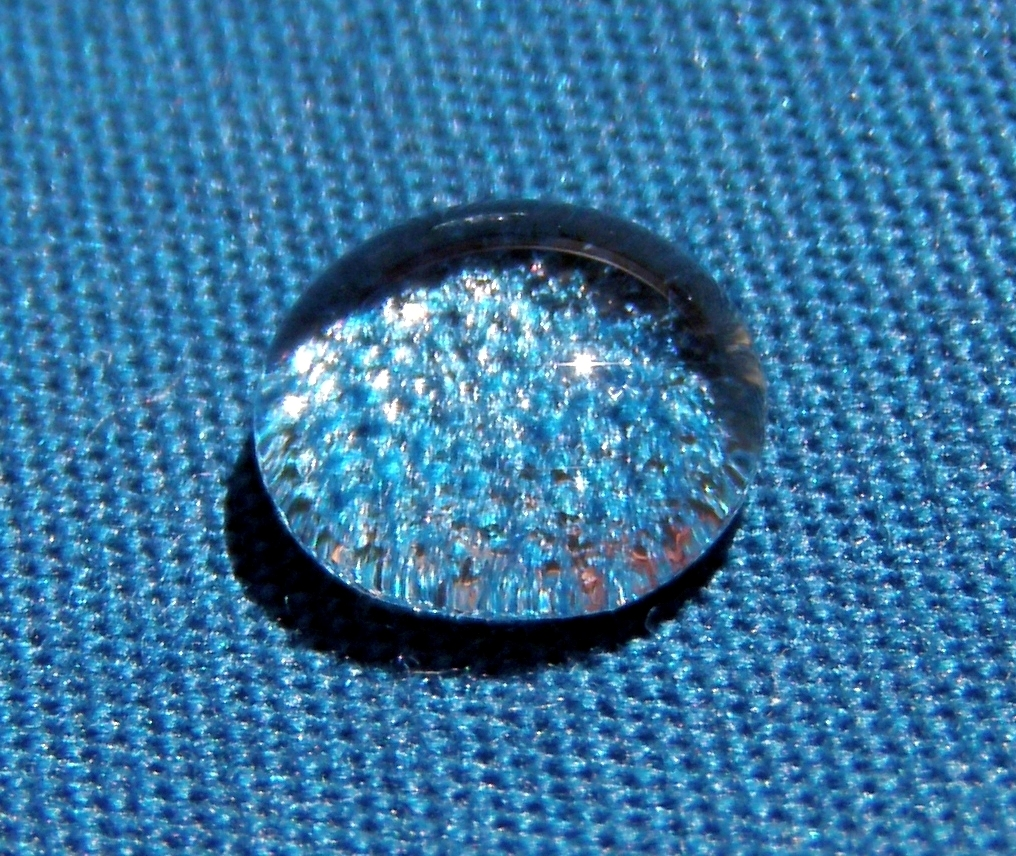
Drop of water on a fabric treated with fluorinated surfactant

Fluorinated surfactants are small organofluorine molecules, principally used in durable water repellent (DWR). Fluorosurfactants form a large market, over $1 billion per year as of 2006. Scotchgard is a prominent brand, with over $300 million revenue in 2000. Fluorosurfactants are expensive chemicals, comparable to pharmaceutical chemicals: $200–2000 per kilogram ($90–900 per pound).

Fluorosurfactants make a very small part of the overall surfactant market, most of which is hydrocarbon based and much cheaper. Some potential applications (e.g. low cost paints) are unable to use fluorosurfactants because of the price impact of compounding in even small amounts of fluorosurfactant. Use in paints was only about $100 million as of 2006.

DWR is a finish (very thin coating) put on fabrics that makes them lightly rain resistant, that makes water bead. First developed in the 1950s, fluorosurfactants were 90% of the DWR industry by 1990. DWR is used with garment fabrics, carpeting, and food packaging. DWR is applied to fabrics by "dip-squeeze-dry" (immersion in DWR-water bath, pressing water out, and then drying).

== Fluorine gas ==
=== Economy ===
For countries with available data (free-market countries), about 17,000 metric tons of fluorine are produced per year by 11 companies, all G7-resident. Fluorine is relatively inexpensive, costing about $5–8 per kilogram ($2–4 per pound) when sold as uranium hexafluoride or sulfur hexafluoride. Because of difficulties in storage and handling, the price of fluorine gas is much higher. Processes demanding large amounts of fluorine gas generally vertically integrate and produce the gas onsite for direct use.

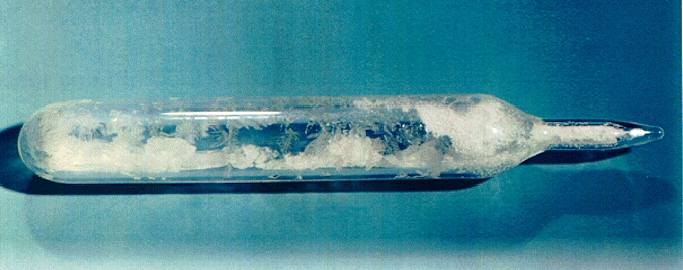
Uranium hexafluoride in sealed tube

=== Applications ===
==== Uranium production ====
The largest application for elemental fluorine is the preparation of uranium hexafluoride, which is used in the production of nuclear fuels. To obtain the compound, uranium dioxide is first treated with hydrofluoric acid, to produce uranium tetrafluoride. This compound is then further fluorinated by direct exposure to fluorine gas to make the hexafluoride. Fluorine's monoisotopic natural occurrence makes it useful in uranium enrichment, because uranium hexafluoride molecules will differ in mass only because of mass differences between uranium-235 and uranium-238. These mass differences are used to separate uranium-235 and uranium-238 via diffusion and centrifugation.

Up to 7,000 metric tons per year of fluorine gas are used for this application. As of 2013, 686,500 metric tons of UF6, containing about 470,000 metric tons of depleted uranium (the remainder being fluorine), were stored at the Paducah Gaseous Diffusion Plant, the USEC's Piketon site, Ohio and the East Tennessee Technology Park (formerly known as the K-25 Site).

==== Dielectric ====
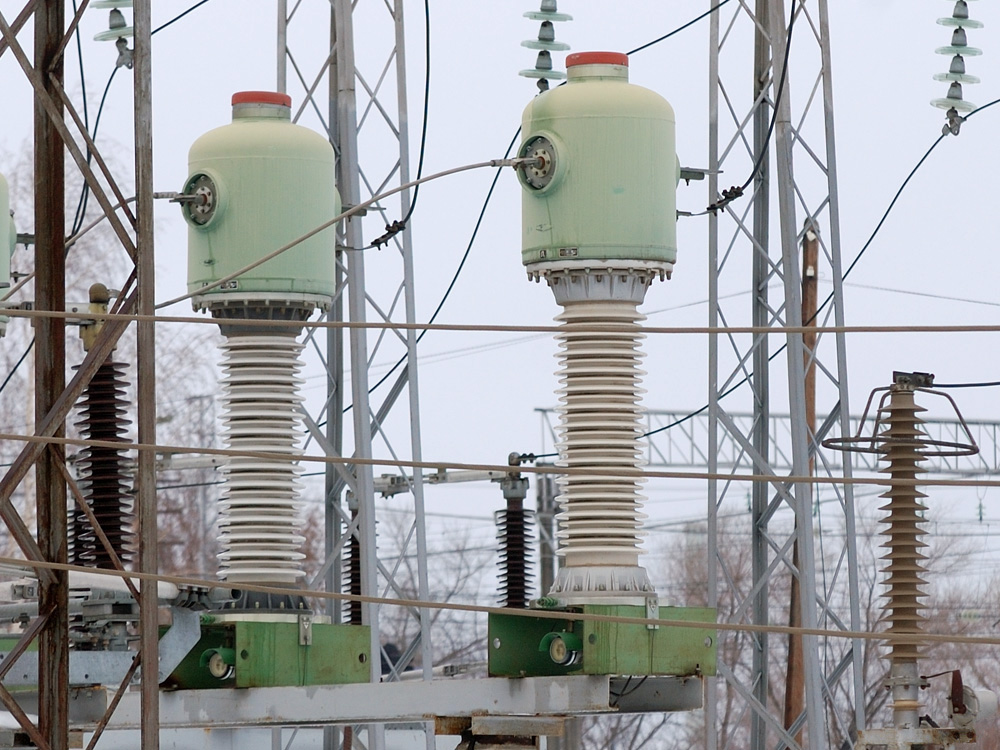
SF_{6} transformers at a Russian railway

The second largest application for fluorine gas is for the production of sulfur hexafluoride, which is used as a dielectric medium in high voltage switching stations. SF_{6} gas has a much higher dielectric strength than air. It is extremely inert. Many alternatives to oil-filled switchgear, contain polychlorinated biphenyls (PCBs). Sulfur hexafluoride is also used in soundproof windows, in the electronics industry, as well as niche medical and military applications. The compound can be made without using fluorine gas, but the reaction between sulfur and fluorine gas, first developed by Henri Moissan, remains the commercial practice. About 6,000 metric tons per year of fluorine gas are consumed.

===== Chemical vapor deposition =====
Several compounds made from elemental fluorine serve the electronics industry. Rhenium and tungsten hexafluorides are used for chemical vapor deposition of thin metal films onto semiconductors.

====== Plasma etching ======
Tetrafluoromethane, is used for plasma etching in semiconductor manufacturing, flat panel display production, and microelectromechanical systems fabrication. Nitrogen trifluoride is increasingly used for cleaning equipment at display manufacturing plants. Elemental fluorine, itself, is used sometimes for cleaning equipment.

====== Halogenation ======
For making niche organofluorines and fluorine-containing pharmaceuticals, direct fluorination is usually too hard to control. Preparation of intermediate strength fluorinators from fluorine gas solves this problem. The halogen fluorides ClF_{3}, BrF_{3}, and IF_{5} provide gentler fluorination, with a series of strengths. They are also easier to handle. Sulfur tetrafluoride is used particularly for making fluorinated pharmaceuticals.

====== Rocket fuel ======
United States and Soviet space scientists in the early 1960s studied elemental fluorine as a possible rocket propellant because of the higher specific impulse generated when fluorine replaced oxygen in combustion. The experiments failed because fluorine proved difficult to handle, and its combustion product (typically hydrogen fluoride) was extremely toxic and corrosive.

== Production of fluorine gas ==
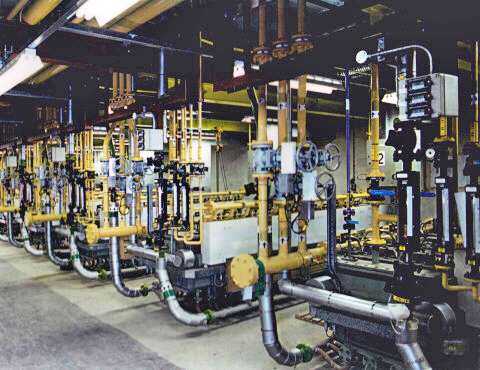
Fluorine cell room at F2 Chemicals, Preston, England.

Commercial producers of fluorine gas continue to use the method of electrolysis pioneered by Moissan, with some modifications in the cell design. Owing to the gas's corrosiveness, special containment materials and handling precautions are required. Chemical routes to the elemental form were published in 1986.

=== Electrolytic synthesis ===
Several thousand metric tons of elemental fluorine are produced annually by electrolysis of potassium bifluoride in hydrogen fluoride. Potassium bifluoride forms spontaneously from potassium fluoride and the hydrogen fluoride:

HF + KF → KHF_{2}

A mixture with the approximate composition KF•2HF melts at 70 °C (158 °F) and is electrolyzed between 70 and 130 °C (158 and 266 °F). Potassium bifluoride increases the electrical conductivity of the solution and provides the bifluoride anion, which releases fluorine at the anode (negative part of the cell). If HF alone is electrolyzed, hydrogen forms at the cathode (positive part of the cell) and the fluoride ions remain in solution. After electrolysis, potassium fluoride remains in solution.

2 HF_{2}^{−} → H_{2}↑ + F_{2}↑ + 2 F^{−}

The modern version of the process uses steel containers as cathodes, while blocks of carbon are used as anodes. The carbon electrodes are similar to those used in the electrolysis of aluminium. An earlier version of fluorine production process, by Moissan, uses platinum group metal electrodes and carved fluorite containers. The voltage for the electrolysis is between 8 and 12 volts.

=== Handling ===
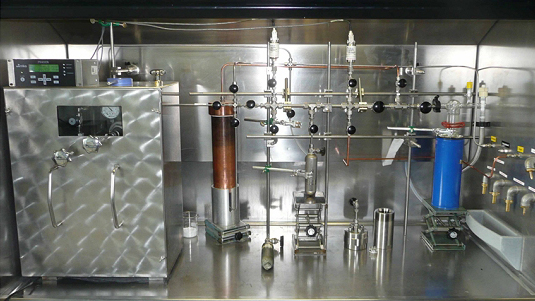
Laboratory setup for fluorine reactions, University of Freiburg

Fluorine gas may be stored in steel cylinders where the inside surface is passivated by a metal fluoride layer that resists further attack. Passivated steel will withstand fluorine provided the temperature is kept below 200 °C (392 °F). Above that temperature, nickel is required. Regulator valves are made of nickel. Fluorine piping is generally made of nickel or Monel (nickel-copper alloy). Care must be taken to passivate all surfaces frequently and to exclude any water or greases. In the laboratory, fluorine gas can be used in glass tubing provided the pressure is low and moisture is excluded, although some sources recommend systems made of nickel, Monel, and PTFE.

=== Chemical routes ===
In 1986, when preparing for a conference to celebrate the 100th anniversary of the discovery of fluorine, Karl O. Christe discovered a purely chemical preparation of fluorine gas; however, he stated in his work that the basics were known 50 years before the actual reaction. The main idea is that some metal fluoride anions do not have a neutral counterpart (or those are very unstable) and their acidifying would result in chemical oxidation, rather than formation of the expected molecules. Christe lists the following reactions as a possible way:

2 KMnO_{4} + 2 KF + 10 HF + 3 H_{2}O_{2} → 2 K_{2}MnF_{6} + 8 H_{2}O + 3 O_{2}↑
2 K_{2}MnF_{6} + 4 SbF_{5} → 4 KSbF_{6} + 2 MnF_{3} + F_{2}↑

This synthetic route is a rare chemical preparation of elemental fluorine, a reaction not previously thought possible.

== Citations ==
=== Works cited ===
- Ullmann, Franz, ed. (2005). Encyclopedia of Industrial Chemistry. Wiley-VCH. ISBN 978-3-527-30673-2.
  - Aigueperse, Jean; Mollard, Paul; Devilliers, Didier; Chemla, Marius; Faron, Robert; Romano, Renée; Cuer, Jean Pierre (2000). "Fluorine Compounds, Inorganic". Ullmann's Encyclopedia of Industrial Chemistry. doi:10.1002/14356007. ISBN 978-3-527-30673-2.
  - Jaccaud, Michael; Faron, Robert; Devilliers, Didier; Romano, René (2000). "Fluorine". Ullmann's Encyclopedia of Industrial Chemistry. doi:10.1002/14356007.a11_293. ISBN 978-3-527-30673-2.
