= Shriram Bharatiya Kala Kendra =

Indian cultural institution

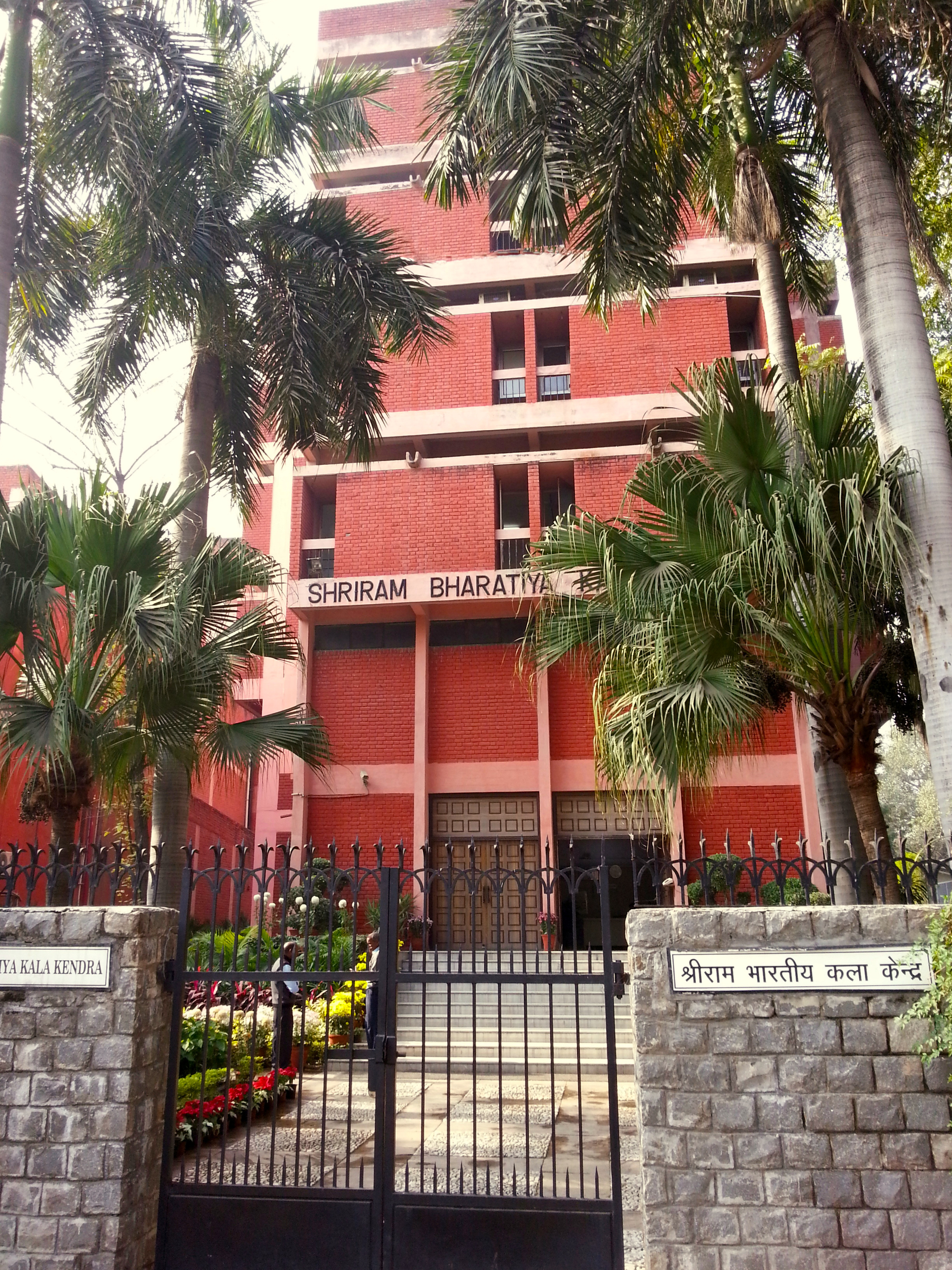
- Shriram Bhartiya Kala Kendra, Delhi.
- Abbreviation: SBKK
- Formation: 1952
- Purpose: music and performing arts education, theatre
- Headquarters: 1 Copernicus Marg, New Delhi - 110 001
- Director: Shobha Deepak Singh
- Affiliations: Shri Ram Centre for Performing Arts
- Website: www.sbkk.in

Shriram Bharatiya Kala Kendra (SBKK) is an Indian cultural institution which runs a school for music, dance and performing arts in New Delhi. It was founded by Sumitra Charat Ram in 1952, and imparts training in Indian classical dance styles and music, including Kathak, Bharatanatyam, Odissi, Chhau, Hindustani Classical music, both Vocal and Instrumental. Its associated organisation is the Shri Ram Centre for Performing Arts at Safdar Hasmi Marg, in the Mandi House area, the cultural hub of Delhi, the centre includes a theater for the performing arts Kamani Auditorium, a theatre repertory company and an acting school.

Often referred as Bharatiya Kala Kendra, Its current director is Shobha Deepak Singh, daughter of its founder, Sumitra Charat Ram. Today, it is known for its annual Ramlila, the enactment of the life of Rama which takes place during the 10-day Dussehra festival. First begun at the center in 1957, the Ramlila has, over the years, used different choreographers and style to include both folk and Indian classical dance to produce fresh choreographies.

== History ==
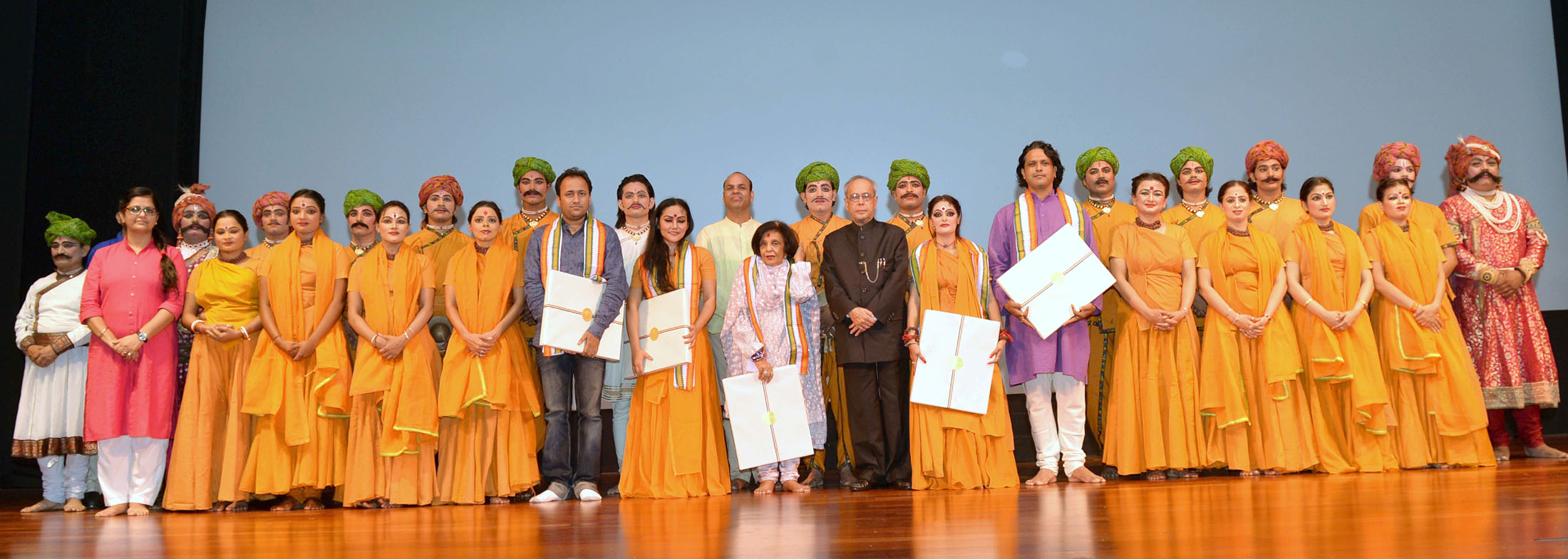
President, Pranab Mukherjee with the artists and Director Shobha Deepak Singh, at a Ballet performance 'Meera' by Shriram Bharatiya Kala Kendra, at Rashtrapati Bhavan Auditorium, in New Delhi on September 06, 2015.

Shriram Bharatiya Kala Kendra finds its origin in a Jhankar, a society founded in 1947 for an appreciation of Indian classical music and dance, gradually it started offering training in music and dance and came to be known as Bharatiya Kala Kendra. Eventually it moved to Copernicus Marg where it was renamed Shriram Bharatiya Kala Kendra, later it was registered under the same name in 1952, under the Societies' Registration Act XXI of 1860. It now has two sections, the College of Music and Dance, and the Performing Arts Section. Noted classical singer Nilina Ripjit Singh, later known as Naina Devi was its director.

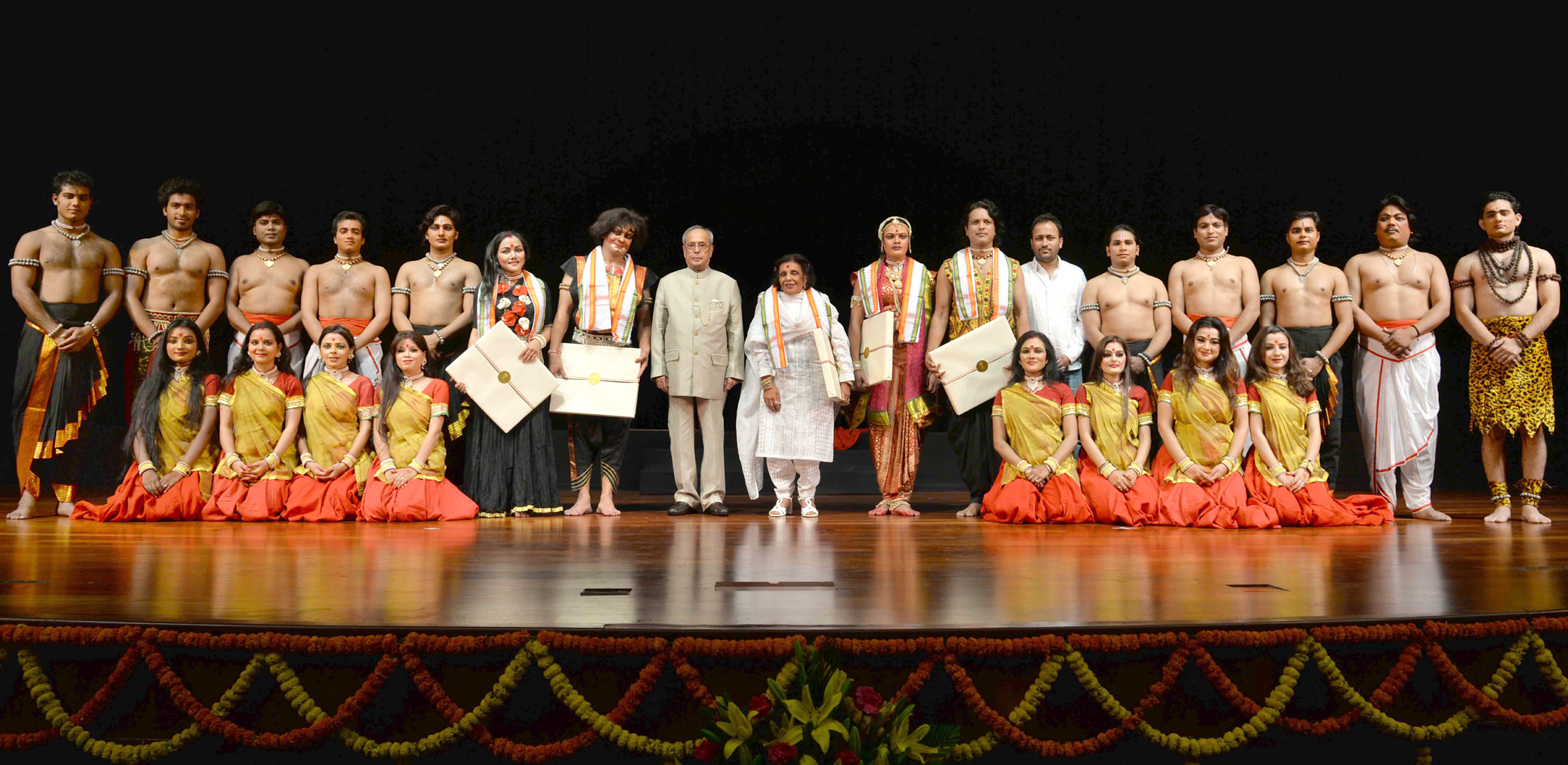
President, Pranab Mukherjee in a group photograph after ballet 'Durga' by Shriram Bharatiya Kala Kendra, at Rashtrapati Bhavan Auditorium, April 02, 2016.jpg

Noted musicians, singer and dance guru of the era worked at the Kendra, including Siddheshwari DeviShambhu Maharaj, Birju Maharaj, Munna Shukla and Leela Samson. Kathak Kendra was originally established as the Kathak wing of the Shriram Bharitya Kala Kendra, in 1955, through the efforts of Nirmala Joshi, the first secretary of the Sangeet Natak Akademi, under the patronage of Sumitra Charat Ram, wife of industrialist, Lala Charat Ram of Shriram Group. here noted Kathak guru, Shambhu Maharaj, taught and his nephew Birju Maharaj. It was later taken over by Sangeet Natak Akademi and shifted to nearby Mandi House to become the National Institute of Kathak Dance. Founder Director, Sumitra Charat Ram was later awarded the Padma Shri by Government of India in 1966, while her daughter and present Director, Shobha Deepak Singh in 1999.

The Kendra had its own puppet troupe for many years, which was run by Rahi and Keshav Kothari, while the Puppet Section of the Kendra staged several important productions over the years, including Dhola Maru, Jhansi Ki Rani and Prithiviraj-Sanjukta, which even won the first at Puppet festival in Udaipur. This played an important role in establishing modern puppetry in Delhi. The Kendra also houses an art gallery at the ground level and its library has a large and rare collection of books, audio and visual recordings and extensive archives.

Founder Sumitra Charat Ram died on 8 August 2011 in New Delhi, at the age of 96.

== Courses ==
Shriram Bharatiya Kala Kendra has two wings, College of Music and Dance, and the Performing Arts Section.

=== College of Music and Dance ===
- Hindustani classical Vocal
- Light Classical Vocal
- Hindustani classical instruments: Tabla, Sitar and Sarod
- Kathak
- Bharatanatyam
- Odissi dance
- Chhau – Mayurbhanj
- Ballet / Contemporary Dance

== Performing Arts Wing ==
The Performing Arts Section of the Kendra put up productions of dance dramas all over the country, including the annual "Ramlila" production.

== The Ramlila ==
The Annual "Ramlila" production, a dance drama based on the life of Rama, at the Kendra has become an institution by itself. The first production took place in 1957 by Shobha Deepak Singh, ideas from Nirmala Joshi, the first secretary of the Sangeet Natak Akademi. The script was written by Hindi poet, Ramdhari Singh 'Dinkar', while Tapas Sen, and Inder Razdan designed the set and the lights. Narendra Sharma and Jayanti Sharma were principal actors and it was inaugurated by then PM Jawaharlal Nehru. It was one of the first dance dramas to be shot and relayed by Delhi Doordarshan. The Ramlia also weaves contemporary socio-political issues into the storyline of the epic of Ramayana.

== Sumitra Charat Ram Award for Lifetime Achievement ==
In February 2011, the first 'Sumitra Charat Ram Award for Lifetime Achievement' established by Shri Ram Bhartiya Kala Kendra was award to Pandit Birju Maharaj, in the following year, the award was given to Kishori Amonkar.

== Festivals ==
- Shriram Shankarlal Music Festival
- Kendra Dance Festival
- Holi Festival

== Location ==
Shriram Bharatiya Kala Kendra is on the Copernicus Marg, a radial of the India Gate, and in the Mandi House area, Delhi's cultural hub. It stands next to its sister body the "Kamani Auditorium" and Delhi's premier auditorium opened in 1971. On the other side is Rabindra Bhawan, which houses a host of apex government bodies for arts and culture, including, the Sangeet Natak Akademi at Ravindra Bhawan, the Lalit Kala Akademi, while Doordarshan Directorate is across the road. Also close by are National Museum of Natural History, National School of Drama, Triveni Kala Sangam and Little Theatre Group Auditorium.

Its nearest Delhi Metro station is the Mandi House station.

== Bibliography ==
- Khokar, Ashish; Sumitra Charat Ram (1998). Shriram Bharatiya Kala Kendra: a history : Sumitra Charat Ram reminisces. Lustre Press. ISBN 8174360433.

== See also ==
- Kamani Auditorium
