= Tina Dabi =

Indian civil servant (born 1993)

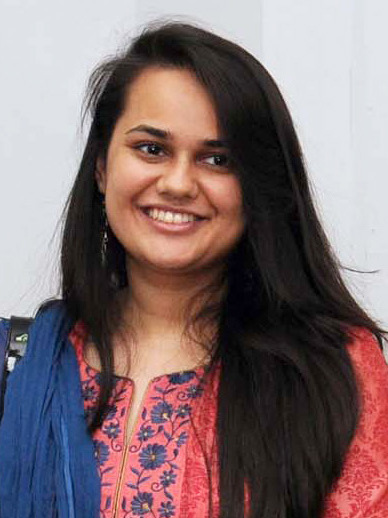
- Born: Tina Dabi; November 9, 1993 (age 32); Bhopal, Madhya Pradesh, India
- Education: Lady Shri Ram College for Women
- Occupations: Civil servant; Administrative officer
- Years active: 2016–present
- Organization: Government of Rajasthan
- Spouse(s): Athar Aamir Khan (m. 2018; div. 2021); Pradeep Gawande (m. 2022)

Tina Dabi (born 9 November 1993) is an Indian civil servant in Rajasthan. She ranked first in the Civil Services Examination (CSE) of 2015. Her scores on the Indian civil service exam attracted intense media and public scrutiny of her personal life, sparked criticism of the reservation system for scheduled castes, and drew attention to casteism in India and to the relationship between civil servants and politicians. According to The Times of India, the event "triggered...a conversation about caste and opportunity".

She was awarded with the President of India Gold Medal during her training period.

== Early life and education ==
Dabi was born in Bhopal, Madhya Pradesh in 1993. Her family moved to Delhi in 2005. She is the daughter of Himali Kamble, who worked for Indian Engineering Services, and Jaswant Dabi, who worked in Indian Engineering Services; both are engineers. She has a younger sister. She was educated at the Convent of Jesus and Mary in Delhi and then graduated in Political Science from Lady Shri Ram College for Women, Delhi.

== Career ==
In 2015, at the age of 22, Dabi took the Indian civil service exam to qualify for an Indian Administrative Services job and came in first in the nation, the first woman from the marginalized Dalit caste to do so. Her accomplishment drew attention to the details of her personal life and according to The Times of India "triggered...a conversation about caste and opportunity", including criticism of the reservation system for scheduled castes.

It also drew attention to casteism in India. Rohitha Naraharisetty, writing in The Swaddle, said the "relentless media gaze...from the outset, had little to do with her accomplishments and more to do with astonishment" due to prejudice. Dabi told The Hindu, "When my results were out, wishes poured in on the first day, but the next day, I started getting messages from the media asking for my caste, because my surname sounded different”.

Her first civil service position was in 2017 as an assistant collector in Ajmer, Rajasthan. In 2020 she was a joint secretary in Jaipur, Rajasthan. In 2023 she was a district collector and magistrate in Jaisalmer, Rajasthan. Since 2024 she is district collector in Barmer.

In 2025, at the 6th National Water Awards 2025, President of India, Smt. Droupadi Murmu, conferred the first ever Jal Sanchay Jan Bhagidari Award to Barmer district, for their success in rainwater harvesting and community driven participation. This initiative was spearheaded by Tina Dabi.

== Criticism ==
In 2024, a video of Dabi bowing to Satish Poonia drew attention to the relationship between civil servants and elected officials in India.

In December 2025, a student protest at Multanmal Bhikhchand Chhajed Women's College in Barmer, Rajasthan, over an alleged increase in college fees received media attention after some protesting students referred to the district collector, Tina Dabi, as a “reel star” rather than a “role model”. The remark circulated widely in news reports and on social media, following which two student leaders were briefly detained by police, prompting further demonstrations outside the police station. The district administration stated that the action was taken to maintain law and order and clarified that no formal charges were filed, while Dabi described the episode as being unnecessarily portrayed as a controversy.

During the 2026 Republic Day celebrations, Barmer Collector Tina Dabi faced significant public backlash after a viral video showed her appearing disoriented and unsure of the proper saluting protocol. Critics on social media questioned her professional conduct and state of mind during the official ceremony, citing the incident as a lapse in the decorum expected of a senior IAS officer.

== Personal life ==
In 2018, Dabi married Athar Aamir Khan, who ranked second in CSE 2015. The Hindu Mahasabha called it a love jihad. The couple divorced in 2021. She married fellow IAS officer Pradeep Gawande in 2022. She gave birth to their son in 2023. ThePrint referred to her as "the Bollywood star of bureaucracy" because of the level of media and public interest in her personal life.
