= SRF Limited =

Indian manufacturing company

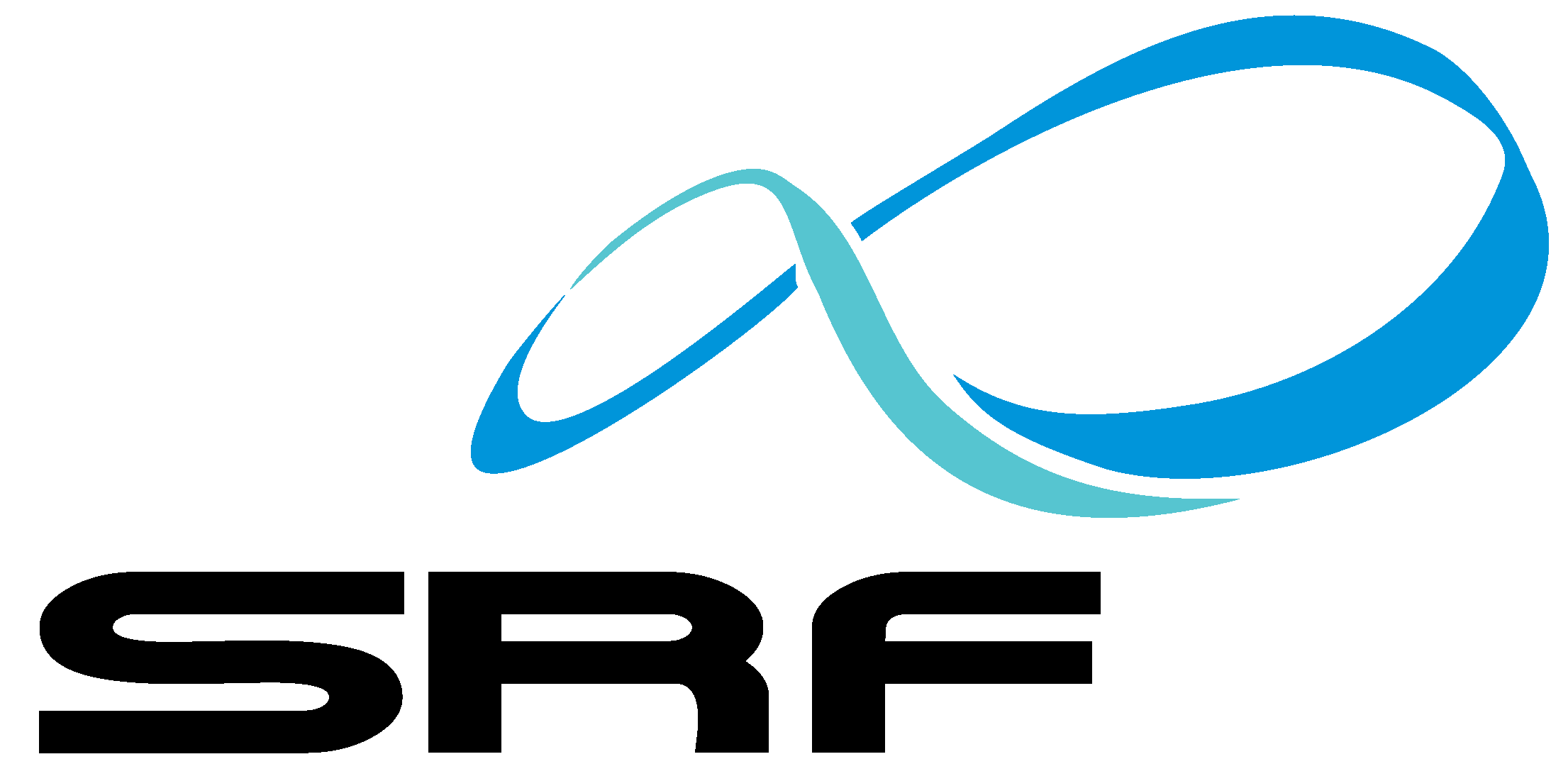
- Company Logo
- Company type: Public
- Traded as: BSE: 503806; NSE: SRF
- Founded: 1970; 56 years ago
- Headquarters: Gurugram, Haryana, India
- Area served: Worldwide
- Key people: Arun Bharat Ram (Chairman Emeritus); Ashish Bharat Ram (Chairman & Managing Director); Kartik Bharat Ram (Joint Managing Director)
- Products: Chemicals; Packaging films Technical textiles
- Revenue: ▼₹3,819 crore (US$400 million) (FY25)
- Operating income: ▼₹830 crore (US$87 million) (FY25)
- Net income: ▼₹432 crore (US$45 million) (FY25)
- Number of employees: ▲10,000+ (2025)
- Parent: Kama Holdings Ltd.
- Website: www.srf.com

SRF Limited is an Indian multi-business chemicals conglomerate engaged in the manufacturing of industrial and specialty intermediates. The company’s business portfolio covers fluorochemicals, specialty chemicals, packaging films, technical textiles, coated and laminated fabrics. It has a workforce of more than 8,000 employees across eleven manufacturing plants in India Thailand, South Africa and Hungary. The company exports to more than 90 countries.

== History ==
The company was established in 1970, as Shri Ram Fibres Limited, by DCM Limited as a wholly owned subsidiary. Its initial focus was on the manufacture of tyre cord fabrics. Its first manufacturing plant was set up in Manali, near Chennai, in 1973.

In 1986, the company set up a joint venture with Denso called SRF Nippondenso, for the manufacture of automotive components. This was later spun off as a separate company in 1993. Another subsidiary, SRF Finance, started in 1986 was sold to GE Capital in 1997. SRF also had a healthcare division which manufactured plastic optical lenses, which was spun off as a separate company in 1997.

In 1989, the company entered the chemicals business to manufacture refrigerants. Consequently, in 1990, it changed its name to SRF Limited.

The company started its packaging films business in 1995 when it acquired a BOPET film plant at Kashipur in India from Flowmore. SRF has since then manufactured both BOPET and BOPP films globally.

The company entered the specialty chemicals business in 2004 as a supplier of fine chemicals to the agrochemicals and pharmaceuticals industry. The business is engaged in custom synthesis, and contract research and manufacturing.

== Business segments ==
=== Technical textiles ===
SRF is the largest manufacturer of technical textiles in India. SRF's technical textile products contain tyre cord fabrics, belting fabrics, and industrial yarn.

=== Fluorochemicals ===
Set up in the year 1989, SRF's fluorochemicals business makes refrigerants, pharma propellants, and industrial chemicals. The company has allocated capital to enter the fluoropolymers business.

=== Specialty chemicals ===
SRF's specialty chemicals business is involved in the development and production of advanced intermediates for agrochemical and pharmaceutical applications.

=== Packaging films ===
SRF's packaging films business manufactures BOPET and BOPP films for use in food and non-food packaging, labelling, industrial and other end applications.

== Market leadership ==
The company is a market leader in most of its business segments in India and commands a significant global presence in some of its businesses/products, namely Difluoro & Trifluoro Alkyl Intermediates (global no. 1), Nylon 6 Tyre Cord (global no. 2) and Belting Fabrics (global no. 3). SRF is the only Indian manufacturer of ozone friendly refrigerants, namely F 134a and F 32, both of which it has developed using indigenous technology. With the addition of F 125, SRF is now the largest producer and seller of refrigerants in India and has further consolidated its market leadership. SRF obtained ASHRAE (American Society of Heating, Refrigeration, Air-conditioning Engineers) certification for R-467A, its low GWP refrigerant blend for stationary air-conditioning applications. It is the first-ever refrigerant from India to have received this certification by the ASHRAE Standards Committee under the Designation and Safety Classification of Refrigerants. SRF acquired the Dymel® HFA 134a/P regulated medical pharmaceutical propellant business from DuPont™ in January 2015 and became one of the few manufacturers of Pharma grade HFA 134a/P in the world.

== Awards and recognitions ==
- Deming Prize for the Tyre Cord Business in 2004
- SRF Limited was listed in the 2011 Asia's Best under a Billion list by Forbes magazine.
- Deming Prize for Chemicals Business in 2012
- ICC (Indian Chemical Council) Lifetime Achievement Award to Chairman, Arun Bharat Ram
- Sword of Honour by the British Safety Council in 2018
- The Economic Times Family Business of the Year (Large Companies) Award in 2019
- National CSR Award 2018 in the category – Corporate Awards in CSR in Challenging Circumstances – North by the President of India, Shri Ram Nath Kovind
- EY Entrepreneur of the Year 2019 in the manufacturing category conferred on Chairman, Mr. Arun Bharat Ram
- Ashish Bharat Ram, Managing Director of SRF Ltd. named India’s Best CEO in the emerging companies category by Business Today in January, 2021
- Best Family Business award in the giga category at the first-ever Indian Family Business Awards 2021, presented by Moneycontrol
- Employer of the Future 2022 by Fortune India
- Ashish Bharat Ram, Chairman and Managing Director of SRF Ltd., named India’s Best CEO in the mid-sized companies category by Business Today in May 2023

== See also ==
- Chemical industry in India
- Tata Chemicals
- Deepak Fertilisers and Petrochemicals
