= Bharat Ram =

Indian industrialist (1914–2007)

- Born: 15 October 1914; Delhi, British India
- Died: 11 July 2007 (aged 92)
- Education: Modern School
- Alma mater: St. Stephen's College, Delhi
- Occupation: Businessman
- Spouse: Sheila Bharat Ram
- Father: Lala Shri Ram
- Awards: Padma Bhushan

Bharat Ram or Lala Bharat Ram (15 October 1914 – 11 July 2007) was an Indian industrialist, born in Delhi, British India.

== Early life and education ==
Born in Delhi, Bharat Ram was the son of businessman Lala Shri Ram, who founded Delhi Cloth & General Mills. Ram completed his preliminary education at Modern School in New Delhi. He graduated from St. Stephen's College, Delhi with a degree in Mathematics.

== Career ==
After his graduation in 1935, he joined Delhi Cloth & General Mills (which later became DCM) as an apprentice and rose to the position of chairman and managing director in 1958. Ram founded Shriram Fibres, which eventually became SRF, in 1970. Ram was the chairman emeritus of DCM, chairman emeritus of SRF and was also the chairman of Coromandel Fertilizers. He received the Padma Bhushan award in 1972.

In the 1980s, he faced a hostile takeover attempt from London based businessman Swraj Paul, which was only thwarted by Indian authorities. He served on various government committees, including serving as the chairman of the Indian Standards Institution. Other committees Ram served on include the Punjab Chamber of Commerce in Delhi and the Delhi Factory Owners' Federation. Ram wrote two books: Glimpses of Industrial India and From Istanbul to Vienna. He also became the chairman of Indian Airlines. Singh also had a key role in the founding of the Confederation of Indian Industries. Ram retired in 1985. In 1990, Delhi Cloth & General Mills was divided into various separate companies.

== Personal life and death ==
He was married to Sheila, who he married in 1935. Ram died at a New Delhi hospital on 11 July 2007. Ram was a passionate golfer and helped found the Indian Golf Union.
