= Munna Shukla =

Kathak guru and choreographer in India

Munna Shukla (7 December 1943- 11 January 2022) was a Kathak guru and choreographer of Lucknow Gharana based in New Delhi, India. Born to a family who has been involved in dance for generations, Munna Shukla specialized in Kathak, a classical dance form of North India. He was a grandson of the noted Kathak Maestro, Late Achhan Maharaj, and a nephew of Birju Maharaj.

In 2006, he was awarded the Sangeet Natak Akademi Award, the highest award for performing artists, conferred by the Sangeet Natak Akademi, India's National Academy for Music, Dance and Drama.

== Training ==
Shukla received his initial training in Kathak from his father, late Sunder Lal Shukla, and later on from Birju Maharaj in New Delhi under the National Scholarship Scheme offered by the Ministry of Culture. During his training, he participated in many productions and gave several solo performances in the major cities of India.

== Career ==
From 1968 to 1975 he imparted training to advanced Kathak students, both Indians as well as foreigners, at Kala Chhaya, Pune. During this period, he also choreographed many duet and group compositions such Talmala, Talchakra, Himraja, Rajput-Ramani, Shahi-Mehfil, Hindola, Kathak ki Kahani, Holi and Tarana. He also choreographed full-length dance dramas like Kaliyadaman, Makhanleela, Banseeleela, and Shyam Bansuriya. Shukla has been well acclaimed by connoisseurs and the press.

Shukla has worked with the students of Film and Television Institute of India, imparting training in classical dancing to them. He has also given dance direction in a few Marathi plays. He has prepared some of his famous disciples like Kavita Thakur, Shruti Shukla and Rakhi Dubey.

Shukla has been associated with Kathak Kendra (National Institute of Kathak Dance) New Delhi, from 1976 till he retired in early 2000s, thereafter he continued to teach in East Delhi as well as at Bharatiya Kala Kendra. His compositions include Shan-e-Mughal (a full-length dance drama), Tratak, Kathak Prasang, Anvesha, Kraunch-Badh, Chaturang, Anga-Muktri, Raganvita, Goverdhan, Bahar, and Kathakayan.

== Other works ==
- Azeezunisa – Dance direction in one play for National School of Drama, New Delhi, 1998;
- Ameer Khusro – an opera for P.K. Kendra, 1997;
- Inder Sabha – an opera for National School of Drama, New Delhi, 1996.

== Awards ==
- Samman of Sahitya Kala Parishad, 2003;
- Sarangdeo Award by Sur Singar Samsad, Bombay, 1989;
- U.P.S.N. Akademi Award, 1988.
- Sangeet Natak Akademi Award by the Sangeet Natak Akademi - 2006
