= Sujata Sahu (social entrepreneur) =

Indian social entrepreneur

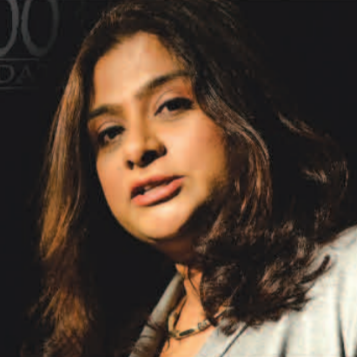
- Born: Sujata Seshan; 18 September 1968 (age 57); Neyveli, Tamilnadu, India
- Education: Bachelor of Science in Mathematics, Master of Science in Computer Application, Pune ( India) University
- Occupation: teacher turned charity worker
- Known for: supporting schooling in the Ladakh region
- Spouse: Sandeep Sahu
- Children: Hansa Sahu, Nikhil Sahu, Siddhant Sahu, Anoushka Sahu and Neeraj Sahu.
- Parent(s): R I Seshan, Retired Air Commodore from IAF ( Father) Girija Seshan ( Mother)
- Website: www.17000ft.org

Sujata Sahu is an Indian social entrepreneur. Having worked as a teacher, she set up 17000 ft Foundation in order to improve school conditions in remote villages in Ladakh and Sikkim. The non-governmental organisation has undertaken Whole School Transformation Projects by providing Libraries, Playgrounds & DigiLabs to remote border schools along with rigorous training of Teachers. Sahu was awarded the 2015 Nari Shakti Puraskar and WTI (Women Transforming India) Award 2019 in recognition of her work.

== Career ==
Sahu worked in the corporate sector in the United States for nine years before moving to Gurgaon and becoming a teacher at the Shri Ram School in NCR Delhi, teaching mathematics and computer science. In June 2010, she went on a solo trek in Ladakh and when she experienced high-altitude pulmonary edema she stopped to recover at a remote village. Having witnessed the conditions there, she decided to set up a non-governmental organisation (NGO) to provide improved facilities for the local school children.

== 17000 ft Foundation ==
Sahu set up the 17000 ft Foundation with her husband Sandeep Sahu and Dawa Jora in 2011. They named the NGO after a trek they made which reached 17,000 feet above sea level. Having made a volunteer-run study they identified and mapped 600 schools across Ladakh. The foundation has provided playgrounds to 140 schools and donated libraries to 230 schools, giving books in Hindu, English and Urdu. Since there were no books in Bhoti, the Ladakhi language, in 2015 the foundation funded translations and supplied 21,000 storybooks. In 2013, the foundation launched the Voluntour program, in which volunteer teachers are matched with schools. The volunteers are limited to one per school per year. For her social entrepreneurship Sahu received the 2015 Nari Shakti Puraskar. In 2019, she was honoured by NITI Aayog with the Women Transforming India Award.
