= Axel van Trotsenburg =

Dutch-Austrian economist (born 1958)

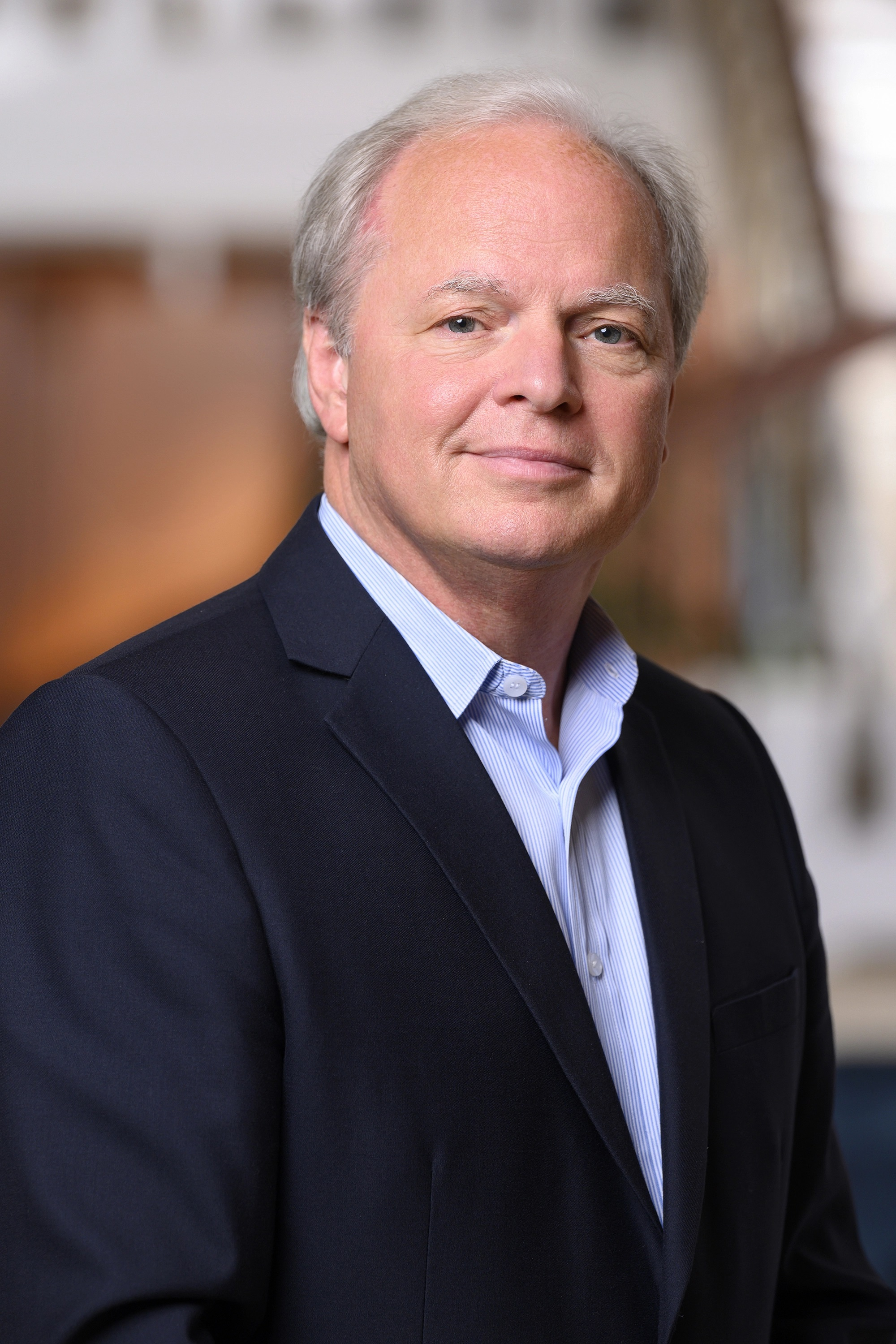
- van Trotsenburg in 2025
- Born: 6 December 1958 (age 67); Bussum, Netherlands
- Education: SAIS Europe in Bologna, Italy, University of Graz, Carleton University, University of Vienna
- Occupations: Senior Managing Director, Development Policy and Partnerships
- Employer: World Bank Group
- Website: LinkedIn profile

Axel van Trotsenburg (born December 6, 1958) is a dual Dutch-Austrian economist and development expert. He had a distinguished 37 year career at the World Bank and was the World Bank’s number two as the Senior Managing Director (SMD) responsible for Development Policy and Partnerships until the end of November 2025, where he oversaw the expansion of engagement on global public goods, climate change, and debt sustainability, and led the World Bank's engagement with the United Nations, G20, G7, and other international financial institutions. van Trotsenburg had several positions at the World Bank including managing director of Operations and acting CFO and CEO.

== Early life and education ==
van Trotsenburg was born in Bussum, The Netherlands, and moved to Austria when he was 12 years old. He studied and graduated with an MA in Economics from the University of Graz in Austria. He then studied International Affairs at The Johns Hopkins University SAIS Europe in Bologna, Italy and at Carleton University, earning a master's degree in International Relations. He finished his academic studies with a doctorate in Economics at the University of Vienna.

== Career ==
Van Trotsenburg began his career in economic research at the OECD, in Paris, where he co-authored the book on "Developing Country Debt: The Budgetary and Transfer Problem." He joined the World Bank as a young professional in 1988 and was soon promoted to Country Economist for Guatemala.

While working in Guatemala, van Trotsenburg authored the project report that supported the Guatemala Government Economic Modernization Loan Project. He also authored the 1991 Guatemala Country economic memorandum. From 1993 to 1996 he was the Senior Country Economist for Côte d'Ivoire where he worked on the CFA devaluation and the country’s economic recovery and debt work-out program.

From 1996 to 2001, he managed the Heavily Indebted Poor Countries (HIPC)],^{[1]}the largest and most comprehensive debt relief program for poor countries. As Senior Manager for the HIPC initiative he was responsible, along with his IMF counterparts, for designing the debt relief framework and delivering debt relief packages of approximately $50 billion in debt service relief to 20 countries during his tenure.

He was named Country Director for Argentina, Chile, Paraguay, and Uruguay in 2002, and became the Country Director for Mexico and Colombia in 2007.

In 2009, van Trotsenburg assumed the role of Vice President for Concessional Finance and Global Partnerships and in 2013 was named Vice President for the East Asia and Pacific Region. Three years later he was appointed Vice President for Development Finance. As Vice President for Development Finance in 2009-2013 and 2016-2019, he was responsible for the replenishment and stewardship of IDA. In this position, he led and negotiated IDA16 and IDA18 as well as the Global Environment Facility (GEF) 5 and 7 cycles, and as MDO and SMD, he chaired the IDA20 and IDA21 replenishments in 2021 and 2024. Under his leadership, a total of approximately $320 billion was mobilized for the world’s poorest populations during these four IDA replenishments.

Axel van Trotsenburg also co-led the WBG’s efforts to obtain a capital increase which resulted in shareholders endorsing a transformative package in April 2018, including an increase of the IBRD capital by $60 billion. [See General Capital Increase and IDA replenishment.]

In 2019, he was named Vice President for Latin America and the Caribbean. The same year, he became acting CEO of the World Bank and was then appointed in September 2019 as Managing Director of Operations (MDO) for 3.5 years where he oversaw the Bank’s global lending operations, with a footprint spanning more than 140 offices. He was responsible for delivering the World Bank’s program of loans, grants, credits, and trust funds, with annual commitments averaging approximately $70 billion/year.

As MDO he also managed the massive increase in financial assistance during the COVID-19 and other crises, reaching a total of $225 billion. In the year before assuming his MDO position, he served as Acting World Bank CFO and Acting World Bank CEO at separate times.

In 2023, van Trotsenburg was promoted to Senior Managing Director, responsible for the World Bank’s Development Policy and Partnerships. He directed the World Bank’s core development work captured by the vertical vice-presidencies – People, Planet, Prosperity, Infrastructure and Digital – and ensured its integration into operations, with a special focus on climate change, fragility, human capital, and debt sustainability. During his tenure, he reformed the Knowledge Bank, creating a new structure and a World Bank Group (WBG) Academy, integrating the knowledge functions of the World Bank, IFC, MIGA, and the Bank’s research arm, as well as streamlining the knowledge products and promoting a new engagement model on knowledge with countries and partners organizations.

He oversaw the Bank’s partnerships, including with the UN, international financial institutions, and bilateral partners, and co-chaired the replenishment of the International Development Association (IDA). He represented the Bank in the G7 and G20 meetings and led the Bank’s climate engagement in the context of the annual COP convenings.
