= Biswajit Roy Chowdhury =

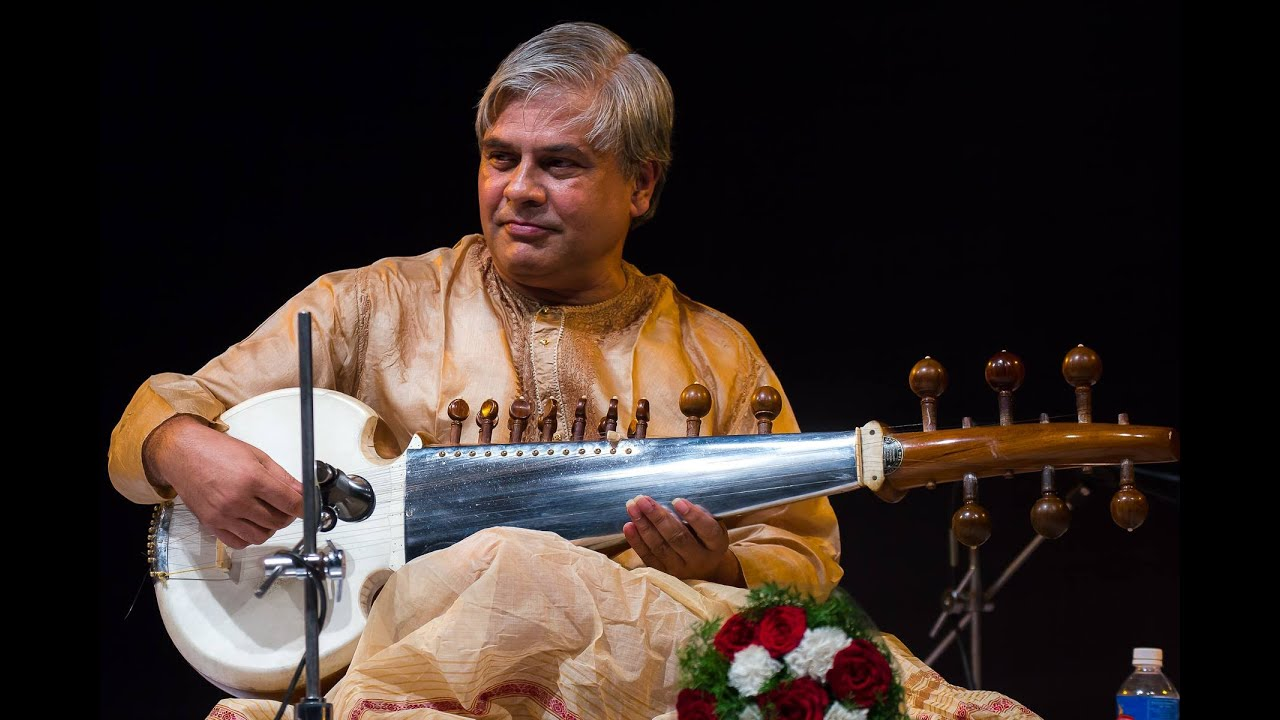
- Biswajit performing in a concert

Background information
- Born: 12 January 1956 (age 70); Deoghar, Jharkhand, India
- Genre: Hindustani classical music
- Instrument: Sarod

Pandit Biswajit Roy Chowdhury is a Hindustani classical musician and a renowned sarod player from India.

== Career ==
Roy Chowdhury belongs to the Senia Bangash gharana of sarod playing, and who has also been specially trained in the musical tradition of the Jaipur-Atrauli gharana.

Roy Chowdhury was born on 12 January 1956, in Deoghar in Jharkhand state. He was initiated into music by his father Shri Ranjit Roy Chowdhury, a teacher of chemistry by profession, but more importantly, a serious Sarod player who had trained under the late Ustad Hafiz Ali Khan and others. In 1978, Roy Chowdhury's talents were spotted by the Maestro Ustad Amjad Ali Khan accepting him as a disciple. A turning point came when Pandit Mallikarjun Mansur took an interest in young Roy Chowdhury's quest in 1982. Roy Chowdhury's tutelage with Pandit Mallikarjun Mansur was formalized in a gandha bandhan ceremony in 1985. The intensive guidance and training lasted till the demise of the guru in 1992. He is perhaps the only sarod player who plays the compositions from the Jaipur-Atrauli tradition.

Over the years Roy Chowdhury has performed in various locations all over India and has participated regularly in prestigious concerts. These include the Tansen Festival in Gwalior, the Shankar Lal Music Festival, New Delhi, the Harvallabh Sangeet Samaroha in Jalandhar, the Vishnu Digambar Jayanti in Delhi, the Sankat Mochan Music Festival in Varanasi, the Dhwani-BKF Pandit Mallikarjun Mansur Music Festival in Bangalore, among others. He recorded the album "The Sarod Master" (1991) for Hot Club Records, produced by guitar player Jon Larsen. Biswajit Roy Chowdhury is an acclaimed artist of the All India Radio and Doordarshan and has featured in the national music concert and the annual Radio Sangeet Sammelan of these organisations. Roy Chowdhury teaches Sarod at Shriram Bhartiya Kala Kendra, New Delhi.
