= The Shri Ram School =

The Shri Ram School (TSRS)
- NCR Delhi; India

Information
- Motto: Vidya Dadati Vinayam (May Education Foster Humility)
- Established: 18 July 1988
- Chairperson: Arun Bharat Ram
- Director: Manika Sharma,
- Principal: Sudha Sahay (Senior School Aravali)
- Principal: Ripple Sethi, (Senior School, Moulsari)
- Principal: Pooja Manan Thakur (Junior School, Vasant Vihar)
- Campuses: Vasant Vihar, New Delhi; Moulsari Avenue, DLF III, Gurgaon; Aravali - Hamilton Court Complex, DLF IV, Gurgaon; The Shri Ram Police Public School,

The Shri Ram School is a co-educational private school in India. It is one of the most sought-after schools in the country. Founded 18 July 1988, by Manju Bharat Ram, the Shri Ram School has four campuses across New DelhiNCR : 1) Vasant Vihar (PV to 5th), 2) Moulsari (6th to 12th), and Gurgaon3) Aravalli (PV-12th) Noida 135(nursery-till 12th)

The Shri Ram School - Aravalli was established in 2000 at the request of DLF Limited. It is a common campus for Pravesh Vatika (Nursery), Upvan (Kindergarten) through to Class XII. It is situated at the Hamilton Court Complex, DLF Phase IV, Gurgaon. (NOTE: TSMS is not affiliated with the main school). The Noida School is located in Sector-135.

== Overview ==
Founded by Manju Bharat Ram in July 1988 under the aegis of SRF Ltd. and now the SRF Foundation, TSRS began with the pre-primary section, and a Form was added every year.

Students are selected based on their academic and intellectual capabilities. It is known for a high rate of rejection and low rate of acceptance of about 4%.

== Curriculum ==
The school ascribes to the ISC and ICSE Boards. In addition, the IB Diploma Programme (since January 2005), administered by the International Baccalaureate (IB) and the National Indian Open Schooling Certificate are offered at the Senior School in the Moulsari campus. The Aravali campus also offers NIOS schooling.

== 2010 molestation incident ==
In 2010, a child was allegedly molested by a contract employee at school. Upon being asked about the incident, Manju Bharat Ram, the school chairperson, stated: "We have taken appropriate steps to ensure that such an incident is not repeated [...] Besides, we are taking steps like not leaving a child alone at any point in time and no male attendants would be allowed in toilets."

== Charity work ==
In 2010, after the 2010 Leh floods, its students formed "Mission Julley", (Julley means 'hello' in the local language), an initiative that included an online community page and events, collected Rs 8 lakh for three schools and a Relief Camp in Leh.

Sujata Sahu worked here teaching IT and maths for two years before leaving to create a charity to support schools in the Ladakh region.

== See also ==
- List of schools in Delhi
