= Lala Shri Ram =

Indian industrialist and philanthropist (1884–1963)

- Born: 27 April 1884; Delhi, British India
- Died: 11 January 1963 (aged 78)
- Education: Hindu College
- Spouse: Phoolan Devi (Lady Shri Ram)
- Children: Murli Dhar, Bharat Ram, Charat Ram
- Parents: Madan Mohan Lal; Chando Devi
- Relatives: Sir Shankar Lal (brother)

Sir Shri Ram (27 April 1884 – 11 January 1963), better known as Lala Shri Ram, was an Indian industrialist and philanthropist. Ram was the owner of Delhi Cloth & General Mills, one of the oldest companies in India. During his business career, Ram was one of India's most prominent industrialists. In 1941, the British Raj government in India conferred Ram with knighthood in recognition of his contributions to the development of Indian society. Ram was also noted for his philanthropy, which included founding the Shri Ram College of Commerce and Lady Shri Ram College for Women.

== Early life ==
Shri Ram was born on April 27, 1884. He was the first son of Madan Mohan Lal and Chando Devi to a Agarwal family in Haryana, which was then British Punjab Province. Ram had a younger brother, Lala Shankar Lal.

Ram's family at the time was known as the Kotwal family, which stemmed from Ram's great-grandfather, who was Kotwal, a military title, in Delhi during the Indian Rebellion of 1857. Ram's early education was from a Municipal Primary School in Bazaar Sita Ram. He matriculated in March 1900 and later enrolled in the Intermediate Arts course at Hindu College, Delhi University.

== Business career ==
Lala Gopal Roy, Ram's uncle, was one of the founders and the first secretary of Delhi Cloth & General Mills (DCM), which was founded on 2 March 1891. Prior, he had been a munim (a kind of private secretary) working in a pedhi.

Ram's first interaction with DCM happened in 1905, when Ram, at the age of 21, attended an annual general meeting with his uncle, Lala Gopal Roy. His uncle died the same year and Ram's father, Madan Mohan Lal, was appointed in his place as secretary of the company. In 1909, Ram, at the age of 25, joined the company as an apprentice in the accounts department under Munim Ram Path and though Ram at the time did not have a formal company title, he had enough authority to act on his father's behalf. Ram ran the company with his father for another decade; however, his father gradually lowered his own responsibilities, and Ram assumed formal charge of the company.

During World War I, Ram secured a large contract to supply tents for the British Army and the British Raj government, which grew DCM's earnings. Ram also grew his personal fortune through the tents contract by forming a distinct tent company which had a tripartite ownership between DCM, which owned 50%, Ram, who owned 25%, and a contractor who owned the remaining 25%. Ram and the contractor were entitled to receive 20% of profits from the tent deal and DCM received 50%. Ram used the money he earned from the tent deal to buy shares of DCM, which increased his holding in the company from less than 5% to 16%, and then to 20% by 1925.

Between 1923 and 1929, DCM's sales increased by three times and the company was the only textile producer in the region of Delhi and Punjab. In 1932, DCM entered the sugar industry and Ram supervised the construction of the company's sugar mill in Daurala, Meerut. In the 1930s, Ram led DCM's entry into various industries that began to manufactured a vast variety of products, including textiles, chemicals, vanaspati (hydrogenated vegetable oil), pottery, fans, sewing machines, electric motors, and capacitors.

In 1941, Ram was knighted by the British Raj's government and his younger brother, Lala Shankar Lal was later knighted as well. In his business career, Ram managed to make managed to make Delhi Cloth & General Mills an industrial empire by 1963, the year he died. During his business career, Ram was noted as one of North India's most prominent businessmen.

== Philanthropy ==
=== Education ===
In 1920, Shri Ram conducted the first experiment in vocation-oriented education by founding the Commercial Education Trust (CET). The first school promoted by CET was the commercial high school, which was raised in 1926 to the standard of an intermediate college, in 1930 to a degree college, and in 1934 to a post-graduate college. In 1942, Shri Ram became the chairman of the governing body of the college. By 1948, although comparatively young among the colleges of Delhi University, the Commercial College had the maximum enrolment possible under the university rules. The college offered a B.A. Pass course, a B.A. Honours course in Commerce, and M.A. courses in Economics and Commerce. In 1949, it was proposed to rename the college as "Shri Ram College of Commerce" but it took three years to implement it due to Shri Ram's reticence. His association with the CET continued right up to the end of his life. Shri Ram College of Commerce later became one of India's most prestigious institutions for commerce and economics.

The Shriram Institute for Industrial Research, founded in 1947 by Shri Ram, started functioning in 1950. Shri Ram believed that if India was to catch up with the rest of the world, it was necessary to understand existing technology and innovate it through research.

Lady Shri Ram College for Women was established in 1956, in New Delhi, by Ram in memory of his wife Phoolan Devi. Lady Shri Ram College for Women began in what was earlier the hostel building of the Shri Ram College of Commerce in Daryaganj, and today, the college's campus is in Lajpat Nagar. Lady Shri Ram College for Women is one of India's most prestigious colleges.

=== Association with other organisations ===
On 16 February 1930, Ram became the 4th president of the Federation of Indian Chambers of Commerce and Industry (FICCI), and with Mahatma Gandhi by his side, delivered his presidential address.

Ram was nominated as a member of first Central Board of Directors of the Reserve Bank of India, effective 1 January 1935.

On 2 March 1937, the Delhi Improvement Trust came into being and Ram became its member.

Ram was the member of All-India Organisation of Industrial Employers (AOIE) since its inception and became the President of AOIE for the year 1940 and 1941.

== Death and legacy ==
Ram died on 11 January 1963. Following his death, S. Radhakrishnan, the President of India at the time, said, "He was not only a great industrialist but helped many good causes. His contributions to education are memorable." Ram's businesses were inherited by his two sons: Bharat Ram and Charat Ram. His eldest son, Murli Dhar, died in a plane crash near Karachi in 1949.

== See also ==
- Bharat Ram
- Charat Ram – husband of Sumitra Charat Ram
- Sumitra Charat Ram
- Bansi Dhar

== Bibliography ==
Khushwant Singh and Arun Joshi, “Shri Ram-A Biography” (1968) Asia Publishing House, Bombay

== Suggested reading ==
- Sir Shri Ram Biography prepared by The Shri Ram Biography Project
- From the Brink of Bankruptcy: The DCM Story by Vinay-Bharat Ram
- Draft of the Biography on Sir Shri Ram written by Bhupesh Bhandari
- Lala Shri Ram: A Study in Entrepreneurship and Industrial Management by Arun Joshi
- Shri Ram, A Biography by Khushwant Singh and Arun Joshi
- How business leaders like Shri Ram inspired workers to excel, Are unions losing influence by Dayal, I (1997) [Stable URL: https://www.jstor.org/stable/27767528]
