= Laminated fabric =

A laminated fabric is a two (or more) layer construction with a polymer film bonded to a fabric. Laminated fabrics are used in rainwear, automotive, and other applications. Windstopper is an example of such fabrics.
