= Lady Shri Ram College =

College of the University of Delhi

- Other name: LSR
- Motto: Sā vidyā yā vimuktaye "That alone is knowledge which leads to liberation"
- Type: Public (women's college)
- Established: 1956; 69 years ago
- Founder: Lala Shri Ram
- Accreditation: NAAC (A++)
- Affiliations: University of Delhi
- Principal: Kanika K. Ahuja (acting)
- Faculty: 150
- Administrative staff: 200
- Students: Approx 4,000
- Location: Lala Lajpat Rai Rd, Lajpat Nagar IV, Delhi, 110024, India; 28.5592995°N 77.2374735°E
- Campus: Urban, 15 acres
- Website: www.lsr.edu.in
- Location within Delhi Location within India

Lady Shri Ram College (LSR) is a constituent women's college, affiliated with the University of Delhi.

== History ==
Established in 1956 in Delhi by the late Lala Shri Ram in memory of his wife Phoolan Devi (Lady Shri Ram), the college began in a school building in Daryaganj, Central Delhi with 299 students, nine faculty, and four support staff. The college is now located in a 15-acre (61,000 m^{2}) campus in Lajpat Nagar in South Delhi.

LSR's infrastructure includes a library with internet access, 1200 books, 50 online journals and 12798 in-house journals and periodicals. Its Board of Governors is chaired by industrialist and philanthropist Bharat Ram.

== Academics ==
=== Academic programmes ===
- B.A. (with Honours): Economics, English, Hindi, History, Philosophy, Political Science, Sanskrit, Sociology, Psychology
- B.Com. (with Honours)
- B.A. Programme in Social Sciences and Humanities (With Honours)
- BSc. (with Honours): Mathematics, Statistics
- B.El.Ed (Bachelor of Elementary Education)
- B.A. (with Honours) Journalism and Mass Communication

=== The Aung San Suu Kyi (ASSK) Centre For Peace ===
- Postgraduate Diploma in Conflict Transformation and Peace-building (CTPB)

=== Rankings ===
College rankings

General – India
- NIRF (Colleges) (2023): 9
- NIRF (Colleges) (2024): 10

LSR College was ranked 10th among colleges in India by the National Institutional Ranking Framework (NIRF) in 2024.

== Admissions ==
Admissions to all Undergraduate (UG) Programs in Lady Shri Ram College for Women (LSR) are based on the scores obtained in CUET (Common University Entrance Test) - UG.

== Student life ==
=== Cultural festivals ===
Tarang is the annual cultural festival of Lady Shri Ram College in fields of music, dance, dramatics, debating, fine arts, quiz, and film.

=== Student clubs ===
LSR also has 20 other clubs for extra-curricular activities such as Hive for art enthusiasts, a Debating Society for debates, and Dramatics Society for drama. Other clubs include the LSR's choreography group, the Western Music Society and the classical music society. In addition to this, there is also compulsory enrollment in National Service Scheme, National Sports Organisation or National Cadet Corps.

=== College magazine ===
The LSR College Magazine is an annual publication first established in 1956 that documents the college's events and activities as well as student and faculty voices and creative expressions in over 14 languages. The magazine includes themed and unthemed submissions, interviews, artworks and international and national news. It is a student-run publication.The college magazine is the earliest institutional record of the college in the public domain.

== Notable alumni ==
- Tina Dabi, civil servant
- Divya Dwivedi, philosopher
- Geeta Luthra, Senior advocate in the Supreme Court
- Feroze Gujral, socialite
- Vinita Bali, businesswoman
- Aung San Suu Kyi, President of Myanmar, diplomat
- Anshula Kant, Managing Director of the World Bank Group.

== See also ==
- St. Stephen's College, Delhi
- Hans Raj College, Delhi
- Motilal Nehru College, Delhi
- Shri Ram College of Commerce, Delhi
- Miranda House, University of Delhi, Delhi
- Loyola College, Chennai, University of Madras
- Narsee Monjee College of Commerce and Economics, Mumbai
- St. Xavier's College, Mumbai, University of Mumbai, Mumbai
- Education in India
- List of institutions of higher education in Delhi
- Kirori Mal College
