= Delhi Cloth & General Mills =

Indian industrial conglomerate

- Industry: Basic materials and technology
- Genre: Conglomerate (multi-industry)
- Predecessors: Delhi Cloth & General Mills
- Founded: 1889 at Delhi in India.
- Founders: Lala Chunnamal, Master Shiv Pershad and Rai Bahadur Ram Kishen Das Gurwale
- Fate: Diversified
- Successor: DCM Textile, Hisar & DCM Shriram
- Headquarters: India
- Area served: India-based multinational
- Products: automotive, bioseeds, cement, chemicals, farms, fertilizers, pvc, sugar, textiles, windows and door, yarns, etc.
- Brands: DCM clothing, DCM Shriram, Fenesta
- Website: www.dcmtextiles.co.in
- Footnotes; Listed on BSE and NSE

DCM Textiles, formerly known as Delhi Cloth & General Mills, founded in 1889 by Lala Chunnamal, Master Shiv Pershad and Rai Bahadur Ram Kishen Das Gurwale, is an Indian conglomerate which was initially a textile business which opened its first mill in Delhi. Starting from late 1980s and early 1990s, as a result of legal and financial challenges the company was split into several industry segments under the DCM and DCM Shriram Group branding, (not to be confused with Shriram Group), and diversified into automotive, bioseeds, cement, chemicals, farms, fertilizers, pvc, sugar, textiles, windows and door, yarns, etc. Some of its entities are DCM Textiles Co at Hisar, DCM Sri Ram Mills, Fenesta, etc.

== History ==
=== The founders ===
Lala Chunnamal, Master Shiv Pershad and Rai Bahadur Ram Kishen Das Gurwale founded the company in 1889 and its first factory, located in Delhi, took two years to build. The company prospered through 1907 and in 1909 Sir Shri Ram joined the company as an assistant to his father during a period of decline. Under Ram's guidance the company regained a prosperous pace. The company went through a significant financial crisis in 1917 but recovered after it received a large contract from the British Army at the time of the First World War. The mill was engaged primarily in the cotton and sugar trades and became one of the top mills in northern India. The company opened a second cloth mill and two sugar mills in 1925. It launched DCM Chemical Works in 1941 and Daurala Distillery in 1942. In 1946 it began manufacturing vanaspati.

=== Expansion in 1960s ===
Over time the company expanded and had many subsidiaries including Usha International, Bengal Potteries, Jay Engineering Works and Shri Ram Fertilizers. In 1964 the Chairman of the Board of Directors, Bharat Ram, addressed the 76th annual meeting of shareholders.

=== Fending off hostile takeover in 1980s ===
In the 1980s the company name was changed to DCM Ltd and it successfully defended a hostile takeover by a UK-based investor. As the eventual result of the failed takeover, DCM was split into four distinct companies in 1990. The four companies were: DCM, DCM Shriram Industries, Shriram Industrial Enterprises and DCM Shriram Consolidated. In 1999 there was further splintering of the company into two additional parts.

=== Diversification in 1990s ===
In 1995, DCM's 1983 partnership with Toyota Motors came to an end. DCM then entered a partnership with the Korean automotive company, Daewoo Motors, which ended in 2001 after Daewoo Motors went bankrupt. During the latter 1990s Delhi Cloth & General Mills had a series of financial defaults and lawsuits. The company's 116 year old manufacturing facility was torn down to make new commercial and residential buildings. The razing was the result of a 1989 Supreme Court decision which drove factories out of the city of Delhi and the mill was moved to Hisar.

== Group companies ==
=== DCM Textile, Hisar ===
DCM Textile, Hisar, founded in 1991 the original 1889 textile mill at Delhi was shut down on the orders of Supreme Court in 1989 and listed on BSE and NSE, is located in the cotton growing belt near Hisar Airport and GJU Hisar on Delhi bypass in Hisar city of Haryana state. Spread across 380 acres (150 ha) with residential campus and officers club, it was set up initially with 33000 spindles, it achieved several milestones, such as ISO 9001 certification (1995), expansion to 45000 total spindles (1998), expansion to 76200 total spindles (2005), expansion to 115000 total spindles (2014), launching of 100% premium cotton yarn brand Primero (2015), launching of 100% superior cotton yarn brand Dinero (2016) and BCI cotton yarn (2016). It is operating as one of the leading manufacturer and exporter of 100% cotton carded and combed yarns, with a monthly capacity of 1,15,000 spindle producing 2500 MT of cotton yarn with an annual turnover of ₹5.14 billion (US$53 million). In addition to its Hisar mill, it has 17 sales offices across India, with exports to at least 11 nations (c. 2017). Its Executive chairman and president are "Dr. Vinay Bharat Ram" (alumnus of Delhi University (PhD), Michigan (Ann Arbor) university and Harvard university) and "Hemant Bharat Ram" (alumnus of Carnegie Mellon University with bachelor's degree in Mathematics and Computer Science, and master's degree in Industrial Administration), who both are descendants of the founder's family through Lala Shri Ram and Dr. Bharat Ram's lineage.
