= Ustad Bismillah Khan Yuva Puraskar =

- Awarded for: Young outstanding practitioners in the fields of music, dance and drama in India
- Sponsored by: Sangeet Natak Akademi
- Established: 2006
- First award: 2006
- Final award: 2023

Ustad Bismillah Khan Yuva Puraskar is an annual Indian award given by the Sangeet Natak Akademi to outstanding artists under 40 who have demonstrated talent in the fields of music, dance or drama. The award is intended to provide national recognition to the artists in the early years of their careers. Every year up to 33 artists are selected. Each award winner receives a cash prize of ₹25,000 (US$270). The award has been conferred since 2006.

== Recipients ==
Other major traditions of Music

- 2013-14 - Yumnam Bhumeshwor Singh
- Nata Sankirtana Pung

=== Theatre ===
==== Play writing ====
- 2016 - Manish Joshi
- 2017 - Kuldeep Kunal

==== Theatre direction ====
- 2008 - Amitesh Grover
- 2012 - Nalini Nihar Nayak
- 2018 - Dr. Chavan Pramod R
- 2026 - Amit Sanouria

==== Acting ====
- 2018 - Namrata Sharma
- 2018 - Sunil Palwal
- 2018 - Preeti Jha Tiwari
- 2012 - Happy Ranajit

==== Traditional theatre ====
- 2016 - Jayachandra Varma Rekandar

=== Dance ===
==== Bharatnatyam ====
- 2006 - Sheejith Krishna
- 2007 - C. Lavanya Ananth
- 2008 - Gayatri Balagurunathan
- 2009 - Ragini Chander Shekar
- 2010 - Praveen Kumar
- 2011 - Meenakshi Srinivasan
- 2012 - Uma Sathya Narayanan
- 2014 - Lavanya Sankar, Lakshmi Parthasarathy Athreya
- 2015 - Shijith Nambiar & Parvathi Menon (Joint Award)
- 2016 - Jyotsna Jagannathan
- 2017 - Parshwanath Upadhye
- 2018 - Renjith & Vijna
- 2019 - Sudipa Ghosh
- 2020 - Mithun Shyam
- 2021 - Pavitra Krishna Bhat

==== Chhau ====
- 2011 - Dilip Chandra Mahato
- 2014 - Satish Kumar Modak, Lokanath Das

==== Kathakali ====
- 2006 - Kalamandalam Pradeep Kumar
- 2007 - Kalamandalam Shanmukhadas C
- 2008 - Vijay Kumar N
- 2010 - M. Amaljith
- 2011 - Renjini K. P.
- 2012 - Kalamandalam Harinarayanan.A
- 2014 - Kalamandalam Arun Warrier
- 2015 - Thulasi kumar Sudhakaran
- 2017 - C.M. Unnikrishnan

==== Kathak ====
- 2006 - Prashant Shah
- 2007 - Sharvari Ashok Jamenis
- 2008 - Gauri Diwakar
- 2009 - Monisa Nayak
- 2010 - Pallabi De
- 2011 - Namrata Pamnani
- 2012 - Anuj Mishra
- 2014 - Souvik Chakraborty, Sandeep Mahavir
- 2015 - Vishal Krishna, Divya Goswami Dikshit
- 2016 - Sanjukta Sinha
- 2017 - Vidha Lal
- 2018 - Durgesh Gangani
- 2021 - Rudra Shankar Mishra
- 2022 - Kadam Parikh
- 2023 - Meghranjani Medhi

==== Kuchipudi ====
- 2006 - Vedantam Venkata Nagachalapathi Rao
- 2007 - Yamini Reddy
- 2008 - Arunima Kumar
- 2009 - Chinta Ravi Bala Krishna
- 2010 - Yeleswarapu Srinivasulu
- 2011 - Kuravi Venkata Subrahmanya Prasad
- 2012 - Vedantam Satya Narasimha Sastry
- 2014 - Prateeksha Kashi, Mosalikanti Jaikishore
- 2015 - Boby Chakraborty
- 2016 - Pasumarthi Mruthyunjaya
- 2017 - Bhavana Reddy
- 2021 - Avijit Das
- 2021 - Sreelakshmi Govardhanan

==== Manipuri ====
- 2006 - Sijagurumayum Nimita Devi
- 2007 - Laishram Bina Devi
- 2008 - Bimbavati Devi
- 2009 - Hanlem Indu Devi
- 2011 - Gurumayum Chandan Devi
- 2012 - Sinam Basu Singh
- 2015 - Pukhrambam Bilash Singh
- 2016 - Sanjenbam Karuna Devi
- 2017 - Adhikarimayum Radhamanbi Devi
- 2018 - Dr Manju Elangbam
- 2022 - Dr Urmika Maibam

==== Mohiniattam ====
- 2007 - Methil Devika
- 2009 - Manjula B. Murthy
- 2014 - Saji Menon
- 2016 - Kalamandalam Rachitha Ravi
- 2020 - Rekha Raju - Overall contribution to performing arts

2023- Vidya Pradeep

==== Odissi ====
- 2006 - Bijayini Satpathy, Leena Mohanty
- 2007 - Madhusmita Mohanty
- 2008 - Rahul Acharya
- 2009 - Lingaraj Pradhan
- 2010 - Arushi Mudgal
- 2011 - Sonali Mohapatra
- 2012 - Yudhisthir Nayak
- 2014 - Rajashri Prahraj
- 2016 - Shashwati Garai Ghosh
- 2017 - Janhabi Behera
- 2018 - Madhulita Mohapatra

==== Sattriya ====
- 2008 - Meerananda Barthakur
- 2009 - Menaka P.P. Bora
- 2010 - Naren Barua
- 2012 - Bhabananda Barbayan
- 2014 - Mridusmita Das, Anwesa Mahanta
- 2015 - Seujpriya Borthakur
- 2016 - Usharani Baishya
- 2018 - Anjali Borbora Borthakur
- 2019 - Prabhat Kakoti
- 2020 - Jollymoni Saikia
- 2021 - Deepjyoti Das
- 2021 - Dipankar Arandhara

==== Contemporary / Experimental dance ====
- 2010 - Madhu Nataraj
- 2012 - Preethi Balachandran Athreya
- 2014 - Vikram Iyengar
- 2015 - Shilpika Bordoloi
- 2017 - Sudesh Adhana

==== Other major traditions of dance and theatre ====
- 2006 - Kapila Venu (Kutiyattam)
- 2008 - Purvadhanshree (Vilasini Natyam)
- 2014 - Sangeeth Chakyar (Kutiyattam)

=== Music ===
==== Carnatic ====
- 2017 - Prasanna Venkataraman
- 2018 - Sandeep Narayan
- 2019 - Palakkad Ramprasad
- 2021 - Vishnu Dev Namboodiri
- Akshay Anantapadmanabhan

===== Nagaswaram =====
- 2020 - V Prakash Ilaiyaraja

===== Violin =====
- 2017 - Trivandrum N Sampath
- 2019 - L Ramakrishnan

===== Mridangam =====
- 2017 - Kotipalli Ramesh
- 2019 - Satish Krishnamurthy

===== Ghatam =====
- 2021 - G Chandrashekar Sharma

===== Mandolin =====
- 2021 - Uppalapu Nagamani

===== Flute =====
- 2018 - J B Sruthi Sagar
- 2020 - Amith Nadig

==== Hindustani ====
===== Pakhawaj =====
- 2021 - Dyaneshwar Deshmukh
- 2023 - Rishi Shankar Upadhyay

===== Sarangi =====
- 2020 - Harsh Narayan

===== Sarod =====
- 2016 - Abir Hussain

===== Sitar =====
- 2018 - Dhruv Bedi
- 2019 - Shakir Khan

===== Tabla =====
- 2008 - Jay Shankar Mishra
- 2010 - Yogesh Gangani
- 2011 - Satyajit S Talwalkar
- 2012 - Savani Talwalkar
- 2015 - Anubrata Chatterjee
- 2016 - Yashwant Vaishnav
- 2017 - Rimpa Shiva
- 2018 - Pt.Shubh Maharaj

===== Vocal =====
- 2006 - Manjiri Asnare–Kelkar
- 2007- Sandeep Deshmukh
- 2009 - C.S. Sajeev
- 2012 - Kumar Mardur, Bhuvanesh Komkali
- 2013 - Arshad Ali Khan, Mallick Brothers
- 2016 - Koushik Aithal, Yashasvi Sirpotkar

==== Others ====
===== Folk music =====
- 2017 -Sarbeswar Bhoi

===== Creative and experimental music =====
- 2009 - Anil Srinivasan

=== Puppetry ===
- 2006 - Anurupa Roy (Delhi)
- 2008 - Sudarshan K.V (Kerala)
- 2012 - Moumita Adak (West Bengal)
- 2014 - Mohammad Shameem (Delhi)
- 2014 - Shreeparna Gupta (West Bengal)
- 2015 - Choiti Ghosh (Delhi)
- 2016 - Rajeev Pulavar (Kerala)
- 2016 - S Gopi (Tamilnadu)
- 2018 - Chandni Zala (Gujarat)

=== Other traditional / Folk / Tribal dance / Music ===
- 2017 - Dr . Ravikumar Chowdarapally (Folk Music & Art [Oggu], Telangana)
- 2018 - Chandan Tiwari (Folk Music, Bihar)
- 2018 - Dinesh Kumar Jangde ( Panthi Dance, Chhattisgarh)
- 2018 - Manoj Kumar Das (Traditional Music Khol, Assam)
- 2018 - A. Aneshori Devi (Traditional & Folk Music, Manipur)
- 2018 - P. Rajkumar (Folk Dance, Tamil Nadu)
- 2018 - Madhushree Hatial (Folk Music [Jhumar], West Bengal)
- 2018 - Ashok Kumar (Folk Music, Uttar Pradesh)
- 2021 - Perni Rajkumar (Folk Dance [Perni], Telangana)
- 2023 - Angadi Bhaskar (Folk Music & Art [Dappu], Telangana)

== Controversies ==
In 2018, Amaan Ali Khan and Ayaan Ali Khan, sons of Amjad Ali Khan, and both then above 35, were selected for the 2017 award in their respective fields, but refused the award stating that it should be awarded to younger musicians.
