= Upadhye =

Upadhye is a surname. Notable people with the surname include:

- A. N. Upadhye (1906–1975), Indian scholar
- Parshwanath Upadhye (born 1982), Indian dancer
