= Binita Devi =

Indian puppeteer (born 1986)

- Born: 1986 (age 39–40); Guwahati, Assam, India
- Occupations: Puppeteer; actor
- Known for: Putola nach (Assamese traditional puppetry)
- Awards: Ustad Bismillah Khan Yuva Puraskar (2022)

Binita Devi (born 1986) is an Indian puppeteer from Assam known for her work in putola nach, the traditional puppet theatre of the state. She co-runs Surojit Academy, a performing-arts school in Guwahati, and received the Ustad Bismillah Khan Yuva Puraskar from the Sangeet Natak Akademi for 2022 for her contribution to puppetry.

== Early life and training ==
Binita Devi was born in Guwahati, Assam, in 1986. As a teenager training to become a stage actor, she saw a puppet drama performed at the Srimanta Sankaradev Kalakshetra, a cultural institution run by the Assam government's Department of Cultural Affairs, in 2003, and decided to learn puppetry there. The institution trained her free of cost; she learned rod puppetry from Archana Talukdar and glove puppetry from Akan Deka. In 2005 she received a two-year scholarship for young artists from the Ministry of Culture, Government of India, and used it to travel to Mohkhali, a village in Nalbari district, to learn string puppetry from Bani Kanta Barman.

== Career ==
Devi runs Surojit Academy, a performing and folk-arts school on the campus of Assam Engineering College in Guwahati, together with her husband, Simanta Sharma. The school teaches puppetry, acting, the Assamese folk dance Bihu, and the classical dance form Sattriya; Devi has trained 22 students in puppetry. Her troupe, eight members who together write, direct, compose music for, and perform their productions, stages five or six shows a month during Assam's puppetry season, which runs from September to March. Her productions include Bishnu Prasad Rabha, Srimanta Sankardevor Sishu Kaal, Lotkon, Champawati, Ravana Badh and Tejimola.

Her largest production is Ram Vijay, a puppet adaptation of a bhaona (one-act play) by the Assamese saint-reformer Sankardev, depicting the Sita Swayamvara episode of the Ramayana in which Rama strings the bow of Shiva to win Sita's hand. Devi began developing the piece in 2016 using string puppets, then switched to rod puppets after finding it difficult to match the puppets' movements to the accompanying Sattriya music; she subsequently learned Sattriya dance herself to complete the production, a process that took about four years. The finished piece runs for about 30 minutes and uses 23 puppets and 17 performers.

== Awards and recognition ==
Year	Award	Notes
2013	Junior Fellowship	Ministry of Culture, Government of India, for work on magnetic puppetry.
2022	Ustad Bismillah Khan Yuva Puraskar	Sangeet Natak Akademi, for contribution to puppetry; announced February 2024 and conferred at a ceremony in New Delhi in November 2024.
