= Madhu Nataraj =

Indian dancer (b. 1971)

- Born: 24 February 1971 (age 55); Bangalore
- Occupations: Dancer, choreographer, arts entrepreneur
- Years active: 1991 to present
- Career
- Current group: Natya institute of Kathak & Choreography Stem Dance Kampani
- Dances: Kathak Indian Contemporary dance
- Website: www.stemdancekampni.in

Madhu Nataraj (born 24 February 1971) is an Indian classical, contemporary dancer and choreographer who lives in Bangalore. She is the director of the Natya Institute of Kathak and Choreography and founded its performing wing STEM (Space.Time.Energy.Movement) Dance Kampni.

== Early life ==
Nataraj was born on 21 February 1971 in Bangalore to M.S.Natarajan and Maya Rao, an Indian classical dancer.

== Education ==
Nataraj did her B.Com from Mount Carmel College, Bangalore. She learnt dance at Natya Institute of Kathak and Choreography in Bangalore and also enrolled for a course in journalism at the Bharatiya Vidya Bhavan.

Nataraj received her dance training in Kathak under her mother Maya Rao, aunt Chitra Venugopal and Munna Shukla.

Nataraj trained in contemporary dance from Karen Potter at the Jose Limon Centre, New York. She learnt under Karen Potter and Sara Pearson.

She has trained in folk and martial dances of India and studied Yoga using the B.K.S Iyengar technique.

As of 2018, she was pursuing a master's degree in Anthropology from Indira Gandhi Open University.

== Career ==
In 1995, Nataraj set up the STEM (Space.Time.Energy.Movement) Dance Kampni which is the performing wing of Natya Institute of Kathak and Choreography. The dance company has performed globally, having traveled to 37 countries including the United States of America, Australia, New Zealand, Europe, UAE and Southeast Asia. It has made approximately 60 productions and more than 100 unique short sequences. She is also the director of the Natya Institute of Kathak and Choreography.

Nataraj has performed in various dance festivals such as the Khajuraho Festival, Khajuraho; Purana Quila Festival, Delhi; Nritya Kriti organized by Sangeet Natak Akademi, Ahmedabad; Festival of Babylon; Kathak Mahotsav, Delhi, Lucknow and Canada and Kalanidhi International Dance Festival, Toronto.

She was a dance curator for the Under The Raintree women's cultural festival in 2017 and 2019.

== Awards and achievements ==
In 2010, Nataraj was awarded the Ustad Bismillah Khan Yuva Puraskar of Sangeet Natak Akademi for her talent in the field of creative and experimental dance. She won the 50 young achievers of India today award. She also received the Mohan Khokar Award in 2011. She is a fellow of Ananta Aspen Centre's Kamalnayan Bajaj Fellowship.

== Other interests ==
Nataraj enjoys reading and she writes on various topics ranging from dance to women's issues. She is also interested in textiles and travel.
