= Mithun Shyam =

Indian Bharatanatyam dancer (born 1982)

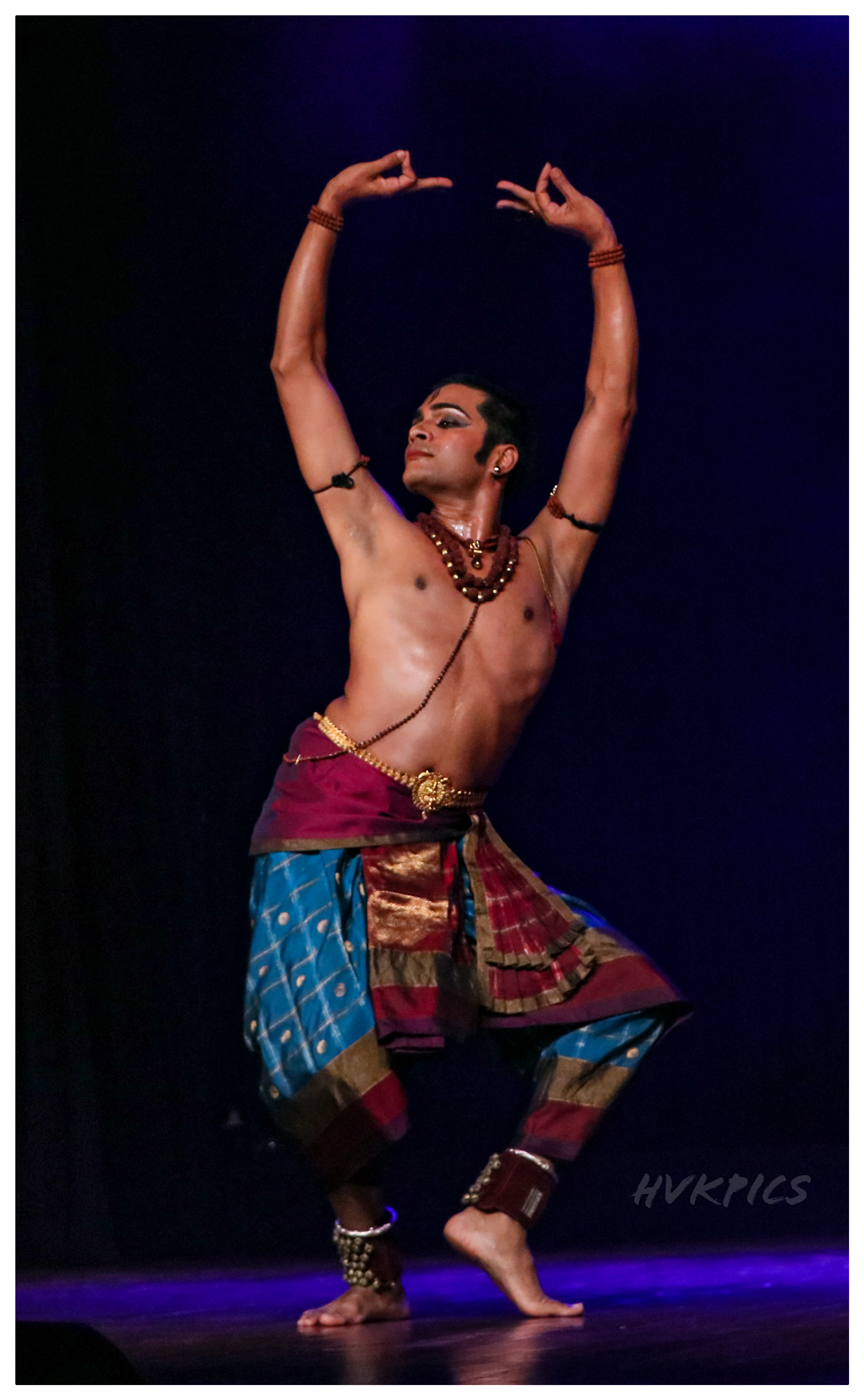
- Mithun Shyam in 2019
- Born: 11 June 1982 (age 43); Bangalore, Karnataka, India
- Years active: 1998 - present
- Organization: Vaishnavi Natyashala
- Notable work: Sudarshana - The lethal weapon; Purushanthargatah - Gender fluidity; Manah - Mental health
- Website: http://www.vaishnavinatyashala.com/

Mithun Shyam (born 11 June 1982) is an Indian Bharatanatyam dancer, choreographer and teacher based in Bengaluru. He has contributed to social and gender-based themes through classical dance.

== Career ==
Shyam is a student of Guru Padmini Ramachandran and is trained in the Vazhuvoor style of Bharatanatyam. He is an 'A' graded artiste of Doordarshan and is also empanelled with the Indian Council for Cultural Relations. His dance productions include Purushantaragatah, Shyama Sundari, Manaha, 18 Golden Steps, Bibi Nachiyar, Gandarva Abhinaya, etc. He established the dance institution Vaishnavi Natyashala, in Bengaluru in 1998.

== Filmography ==
Year	Film	Role	Notes
2020	Shoonyam	Himself	Silent short film with dance performances
2023	Chandramukhi 2	Gunasekaran	Lead role

== Performances ==
- Shoonyam (2020 silent short film with dance performances)
- Raindrops Festival
- ICCR Horizon Series
- Dasyam Festival
- India International Centre
- Drishti Dance Festival
- Dasyam Festival
- Hampi Utsava
- Karthik Fine Arts
- Ananya Nritya Dhaare
- Narthaka Festival
- Rasa Sanje
- Nrityanjali Festival
- Nirgun Samaroh
- Kinkini Nrityotsava

== Awards and accolades ==
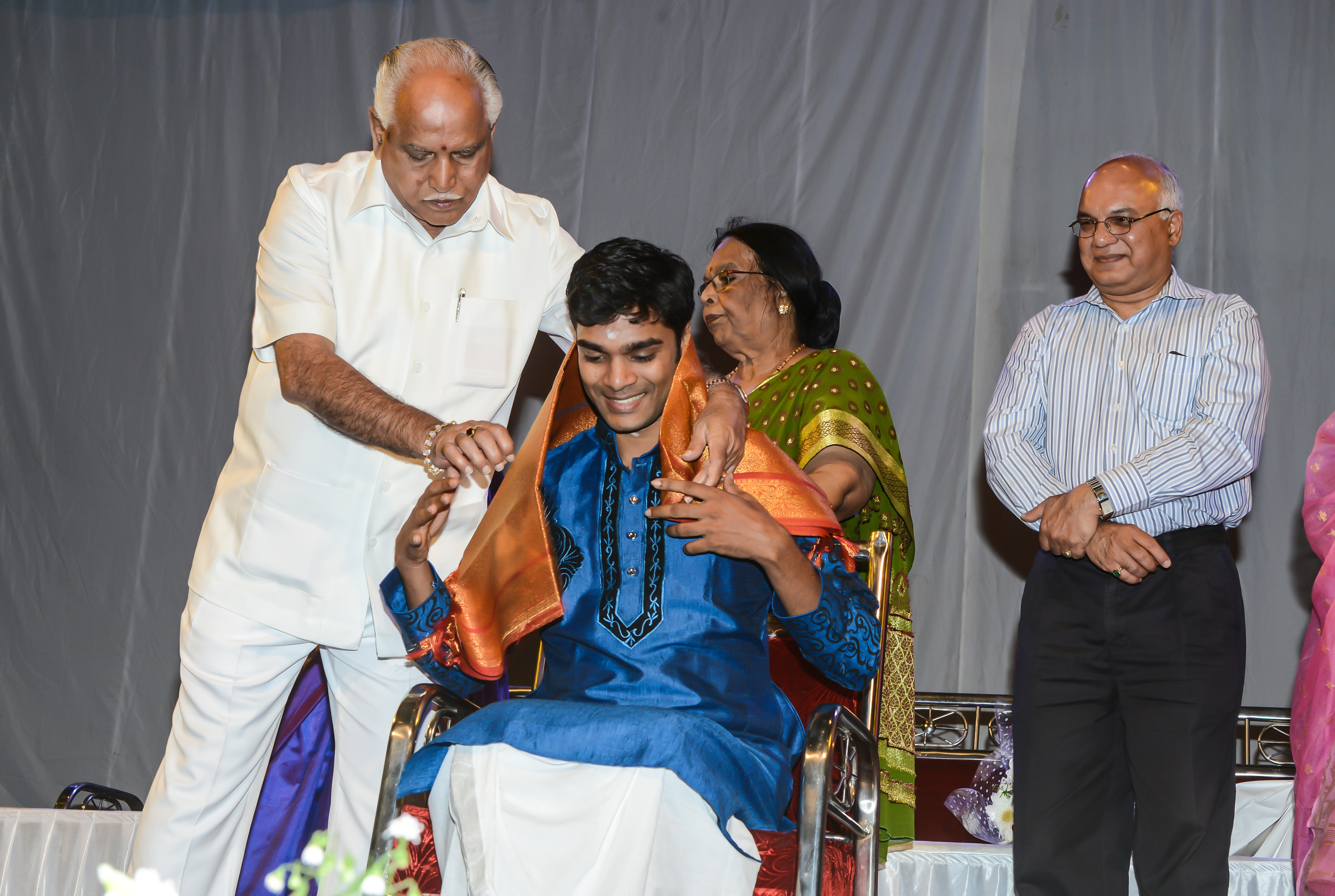
Mithun Shyam receiving Yuva Kala Prathibha award by BCKA from Shri. B. S. Yediyurappa in 2014

Yuva Kala Prathibha - presented by BCKA in 2014
Nrithya Sundaram - presented by Bharathanjali Trust in 2016
Young Natyacharya Award - presented by The Dance India in 2017
Kavi Sarvagna Prashasthi - presented by Kannada Rakshana Samithi in 2017
Kannada Natya Kausthubha Prashasthi - presented by Kannada Abhivrudhi Pradhikara in association with Kannada & Culture in 2018
Kala Rathna Prashasthi - presented by Akhila Karnataka Brahmana Yuvakara Sangha in2021
Natya kala Kesari - presented by Lios Club International in 2021
Kala Shreshta - presented by Sangeet Nritya Bharati Academy in 2022
Ustad Bismillah Khan Yuva Puraskar - presented by Sangeet Natak Akademi for the year 2020
