= Maya Rao =

Indian classical dancer and choreographer (1928-2014)

- Born: 2 May 1928; Malleswaram, Bangalore
- Died: 1 September 2014 (aged 86); Bangalore
- Occupations: Kathak guru, dancer, choreographer Founder Natya Institute of Kathak and Choreography (NIKC, 1987)
- Years active: 1945– 2014
- Career
- Current group: Natya and Stem Dance Kampani
- Dances: Kathak

Maya Rao (2 May 1928 – 1 September 2014) was an Indian classical dancer, choreographer and educator, in Kathak dance. She is known for her pioneering work in Kathak choreography, especially in dance ballets, and is credited for bringing Kathak, a North Indian-dance style to South India, when she opened her dance school, Natya Institute of Kathak and Choreography (NIKC) in Malleswaram, Bangalore in 1987. She was also the founder director of her dance company, "Natya and Stem Dance Kampni", an amalgam of NIKC and the STEM Dance Kampni ( founded by her daughter Madhu Nataraj) based in Bangalore. After her early training under Guru Sohanlal of Jaipur Gharana, followed by Guru Sunder Prasad also of the Jaipur Gharana, and went to train under Guru Shambhu Maharaj of Lucknow Gharana at Kathak Kendra (National Institute of Kathak Dance) in Delhi.

She was awarded the Sangeet Natak Akademi Award, given by Sangeet Natak Akademi, the National Academy for Music, Dance and Drama in 1989. In 2011, the Akademi awarded her the Sangeet Natak Akademi Tagore Ratna, given to 100 artists from across India to mark the 150th birth anniversary of Rabindranath Tagore, for their contribution in the field of performing arts.

== Early life ==
She was born in Malleswaram, Bangalore to orthodox Konkani Saraswat Brahmin family of Hattangadi Sanjeev Rao, a renowned architect in the city, and Subhadra Bai. She had three brothers and three sisters. At an early age she learnt Hindustani classical music – vocal and instrumental dilruba from Rama Rao, being from an orthodox family where girls didn't learn dance, considered a taboo. However, this changed when at age 12, after she and her architect father watched dancer Uday Shankar's troupe perform at BRV Talkies auditorium in Bangalore. Moved by the performance, his father wanted his daughters to learn dance.

Her guru Pandit Ramarao Naik, was a disciple of Ustad Faiyaz Khan, and vocalist of the Agra gharana. He ran music and dance school at Benson Town, Bangalore, where various dance and music styles were taught. Here Sohan Lal from Jaipur Gharana was in charge of the Kathak section. Soon, her younger sisters, Uma and Chitra, six years and four years old respectively, started learning Kathak from under Guru Sohanlal, while she at age twelve was considered too old for Kathak. Finally, her father allowed her to start her Kathak training in 1942, with a promise to never dance professionally or on stage, which she was soon break. She learnt from him for next two years. However, when she gave a first performance in 1944, at the Town Hall for a Saraswat Samaj community programme, her father didn't object.

After completing her schooling she joined B.A. (hon.) in English literature at Central College, Bangalore in 1945, and later studied at Maharani's College in Bangalore. Here, she formed a club to dance and presented dance-dramas. This paved way for her first major performance, a ballet "Sita Haran" in 1947, for poor students at Maharani's College. Meanwhile, her father died in 1946, after being cheated in business and incurring heavy losses. Their family home was auctioned within a year and the family moved to a one-room house. Soon she along with her brother Manohar took charge to household, and she started teaching dance at age 17, to support her family.

== Career ==
She moved to Jaipur in 1951, in search of Kathak. She also started teaching English at the Maharani Gayatri Devi Girls' Public School for next two years. She then moved to Sri Lanka and studied Kandyan dance with legendary dancer, Chitrasena. Subsequently, in 1955, she received the prestigious Government of India scholarship and trained under noted Guru, Shambhu Maharaj of the Lucknow Gharana at the Bharatiya Kala Kendra, New Delhi. She was the first student of the Kendra and Pt Shambhu Maharaj was the first Guru. She was the only student he ever danced with in all his life. In 1960, she was selected for the USSR Cultural Scholarship in Choreography to study for her Master's in Choreography. Upon her return from Russia in 1964, with the help of Kamaladevi Chattopadhyay, then Vice Chairperson of Sangeet Natak Akademi, she started the Natya Institute of Choreography in Delhi under the aegis of the Bharatiya Natya Sangh.

Thereafter, she was based in Delhi for several years before she moved NIKC to Bangalore on invitation from the then Chief Minister Ramakrishna Hegde, which opened on 12 July 1987. Already known for her abhinaya anga, she has to her credit several notable dance ballets production, such as Venkateshwara Vilasam, Kathak through the Ages, Art and Life, Surdas, Barsha Mangal, Tarana, Ramayana Darshanam, Hoysala Vaibhava, The Vision of Amir Khusrau, Tulsi Ke Ram, and Urubhanga by Bhasa, besides Krishnadevaraya, Vijayanagara Vaibhava, Masti Venkatesha Iyengar's Kaamana Billu and works of noted Kannada writer Kuvempu.

She became the chairperson of Karnataka Sangeet Nritya Academy, state academy for music and dance, and during her tenure from 1987 to 1990, she started National Performing Arts Festivals at heritage monuments of the state, like Somanathapura, Pattadakal and Halebidu. She was awarded the Sangeet Natak Akademi Award for Creative dance/Choreography, given by the Sangeet Natak Akademi, India's National Academy of Music, Dance & Drama in 1989. She was awarded Rajyotsava Award, second highest civilian honour of the Karnataka state in 1986, and the Shantala Award for the year 1999, by Government of Karnataka. In 2013, she received the 'Tagore Ratna' award, given Sangeet Natak Akademi, also in the same year she received the lifetime achievement award for her contribution to dance and choreography at the Epic Women conference. Over the years, she has trained over 3,000 students, notably, Nirupama Rajendra, Syed Sallauddin Pasha, Satya Narayana Charka, Shambhu Hegde, Shivananda Hegde, and Nandini Mehta.

Her daughter Madhu Nataraj is an acclaimed dancer and choreographer, and started STEM Kampni, a branch of NIKC.She continued as s a consultant choreographer at her institute till her last days. Maya Rao's autobiography, Maya Rao – A Lifetime in Choreography was completed by her in 2013 and released by playwright and Jnanpith awardee Shri Girish Karnad in July 2014.

She died of massive cardiac arrest shortly after midnight on 1 September 2014, at M S Ramaiah Memorial Hospital, Bangalore, where she was admitted around 11.30 pm due complains of breathlessness and chest pain. She was survived by her sisters Chitra Venugopal and Uma Rao, and daughter Madhu Nataraj, Kathak and contemporary dancer.

== Awards and honors ==
- 1989: Sangeet Natak Akademi Award
- 1999: Shantala Natya Sri Award
- 2004: Keremane Award
- 2011: Sangeet Natak Akademi Tagore Ratna
