= Nirupama Rajendra =

Indian classical dancer

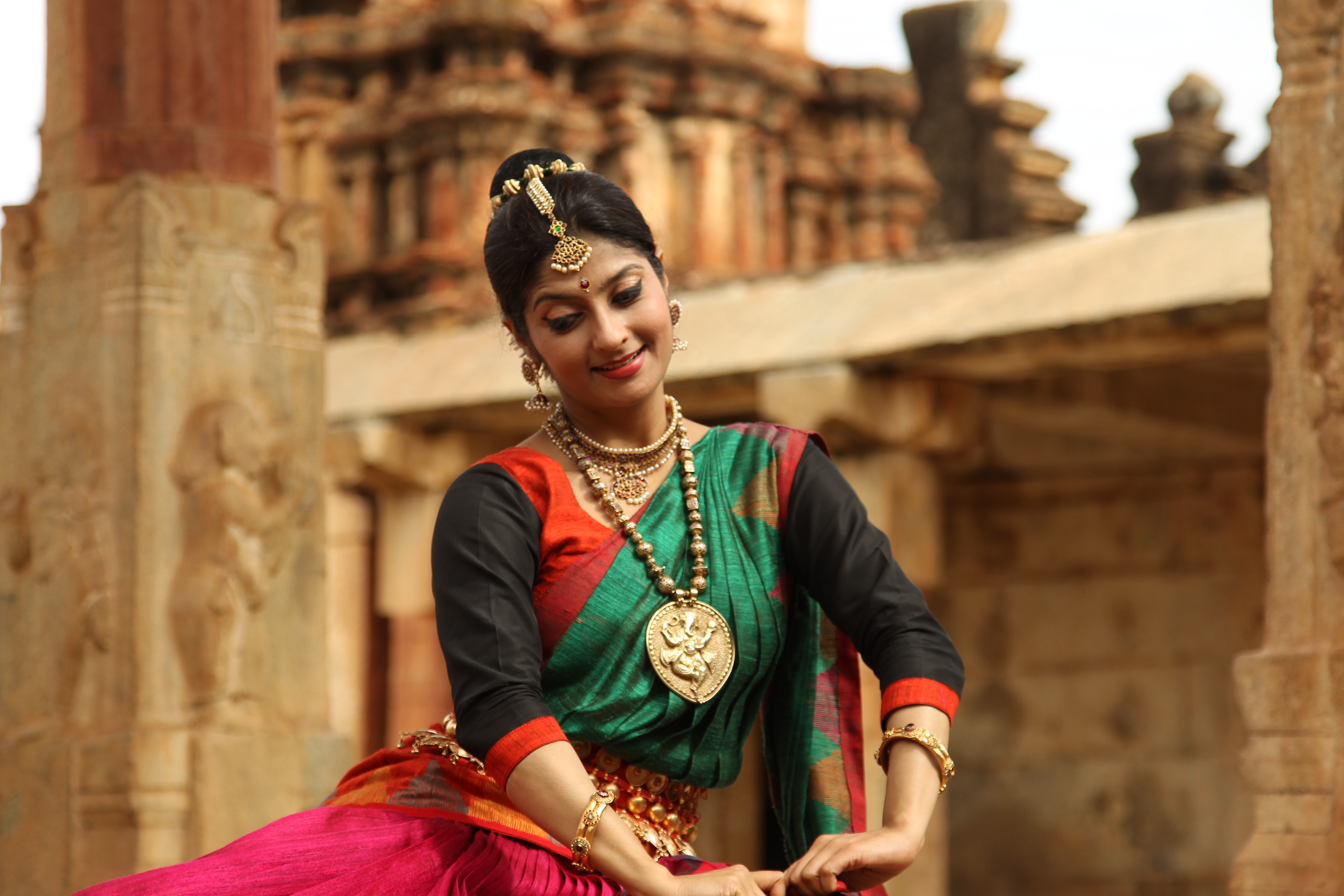
- Nirupama posing during Bharatanatyam at Bogha Nandeeshwara Temple.
- Born: Bengaluru Karnataka, India
- Occupations: Dancers & Artistic Directors of Abhinava Dance Company
- Career
- Dances: Bharathanatyam, Kathak
- Website: www.abhinavadancecompany.com

Nirupama Rajendra is an Indian classical dancer who performs in Bharathnatyam and Kathak dance forms. She is based in Bangalore, Karnataka. Nirupama and her husband Rajendra (ನಿರುಪಮ ಮತ್ತು ರಾಜೇಂದ್ರ) perform Kathak together. They established the Abhinava Dance Company in 1994 with an aim to make dance more accessible. They are known for fusing traditional and contemporary dance styles. The dance duo has given many performances and received several awards including Natya Mayuri and Natya Mayura (1998), Karnataka Kalashree (2011) and Nritya Choodamani.

== Early life ==
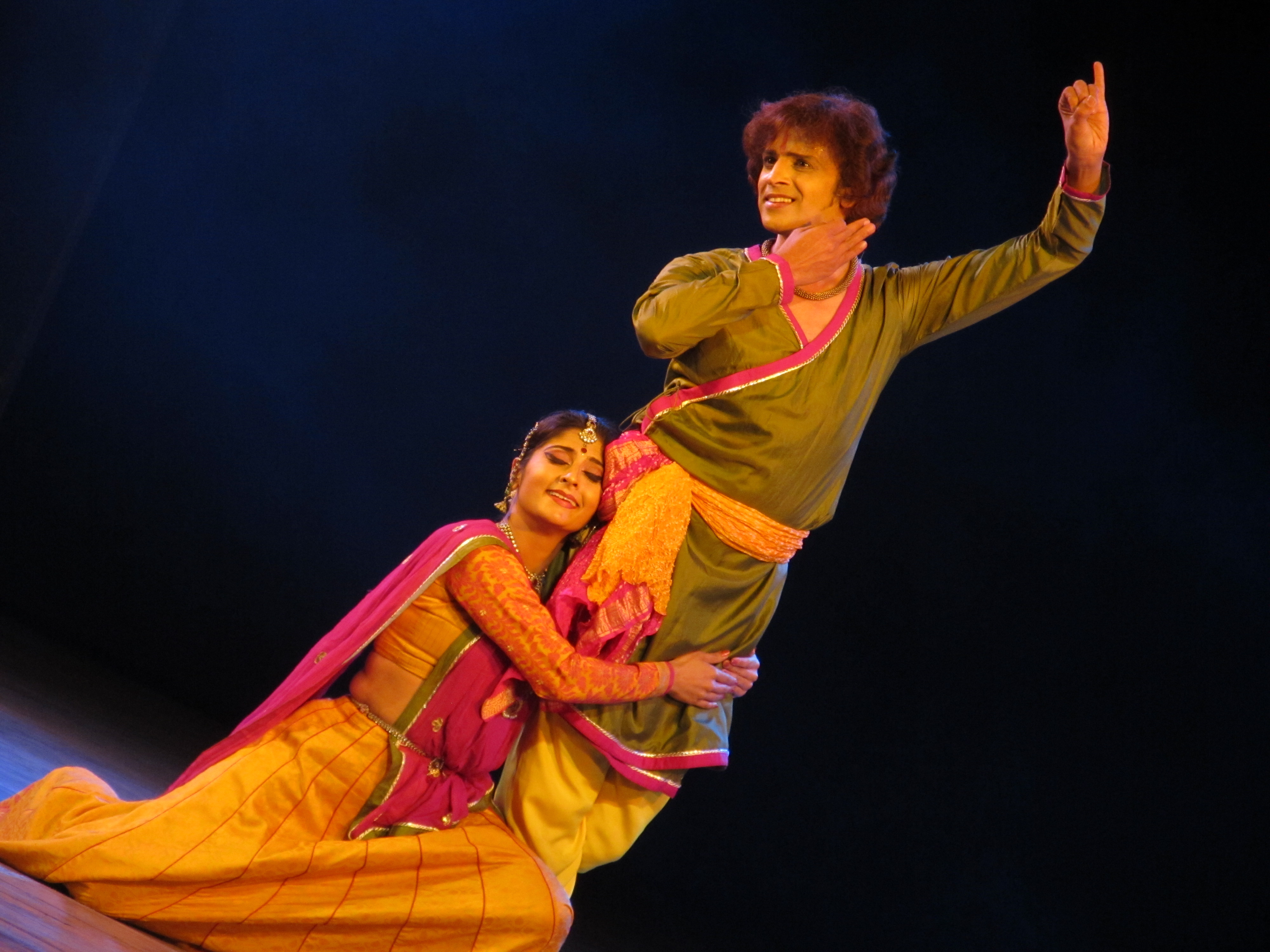
Rajendra Performing at Maha Maya Dance Festival, Ravindra Kalakshetra, Bengaluru in 2013

Nirupama had a passion for dance from a very young age. She began her formal training in Bharathanatyam at the age of five. She saw dance as a major form of expression and enjoyed sharing it with people. Her passion for the art form of Kathak began under the tutelage of Guru Maya Rao. She learnt both Kathak and Bharatanatyam as a young child.

=== Personal life ===
Nirupama met her spouse as a young adult when both she and Rajendra were students under their Guru Maya Rao. She is an alumna of Mount Carmel College, Bangalore. At the age of 25, they got married and started their careers in the performing arts as dancers. Over the years, their journey has been that of experimentation, training, and practice. Today they are widely recognized as artists who have given a new and modern twist to Kathak through their dance company, Abhinava.

== Abhinava Dance Company ==
Abhinava Dance Company was established in 1994 with the objective to make traditional Indian dance forms approachable to audiences in India and around the world. The dance company blossomed under the passionate influence of Nirupama and Rajendra. The dance company has choreographed various dance recitals that embody both God and Nature.

Deeply rooted in tradition, the duo has developed a distinctive presentation style, a fusion of ethnic and contemporary dance and music genres like Jazz, Spanish, Afro, and World Music. The style of merging contemporary with traditional art was inspired by Kumudini Lakhia. Abhinava Dance Company has revitalized classical dance, keeping in mind the originality of the art form. While incorporating new techniques and styles, the dance company endeavors to retain the actual essence of the story.

=== Performances ===
Nirupama, throughout her career, has choreographed and performed for various events. The company also hosts an annual festival called Madanothsava, which is a celebration of life and the season of spring. Some notable performances are:

- Harshika - 2020
- Festival Parva - 2020 - 3 day - Day 1 - Rama Katha Vismaya (Ramayana), Day 2 - Interdisciplinary Conclave, Day 3 - Madanothsava (Spring Celebration)
- Kala Dwaraka - 2020 - Online Dance Festival
- Rasaananda(love for Krishna)
- Krishnaa - Fire to Frost - 2019 - based on Draupadi
- OJAS - A rendition of Krishna - 2010

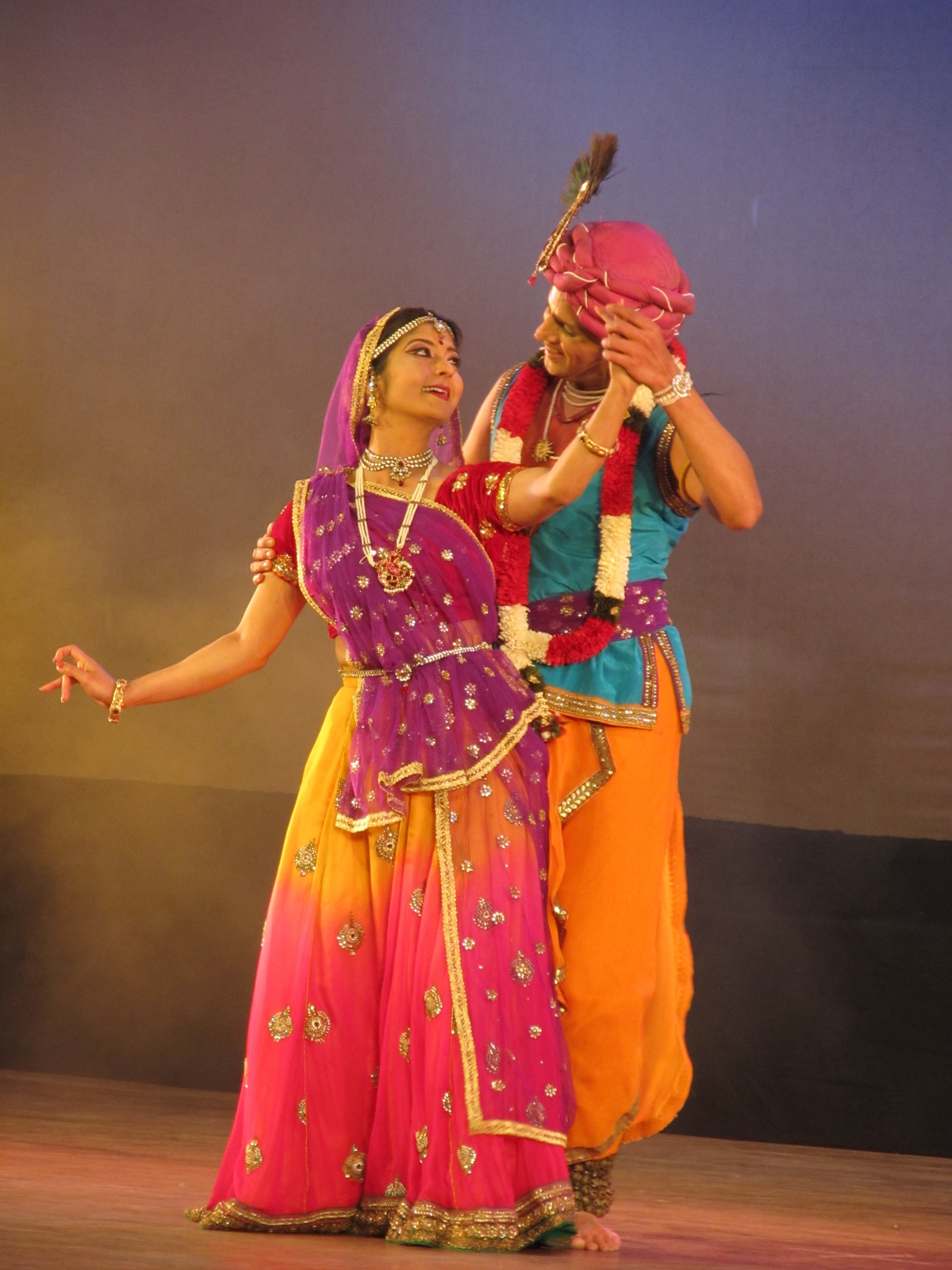
Rajendra OJAS Performance in Chowdiah Memorial Hall, Bengaluru in the year 2013

== Awards and recognitions ==
For her tremendous contributions to the field of performing arts, she has received various awards such as:

- Nirupama- Natya Mayuri - (1998)
- Rajendra Sir- Natya Mayura- (1998)
- Karnataka Kalashree Award for their outstanding contribution in the field of performing arts- (2011)
- Krishna Gana Sabha's prestigious dance title Nritya Choodamani
- In 2013, Nirupama Rajendra were honoured for their contributions at Maha Maya, a dance festival organized as a tribute to dancer US Krishna Rao in Ravindra Kalakshetra in Bangalore.
- Sangeet Natak Akademi Award (2023)
