= Sarbeswar Bhoi =

Singer

- Born: Sarbeswar Bhoi; Rekhpur, Narla, Kalahandi, Odisha
- Genre: Sambalpuri Folk
- Occupations: Singer, Teacher
- Instruments: Dhol, Mahuri, Tasha
- Years active: 2006

External videos
- Official Audio Song of Likri Jhikri, Youtube Video

Sarbeswar Bhoi is an Indian folksinger from Kalahandi, India of Sambalpuri folk music. He sang songs such as "Likri Jhkri' and "Lal Jhara Jhara" for the Sambalpuri movie Aadim Vichar, which won National Award for Best Feature Film in Odia Category in 2014.

== Early life ==
He was born in a Hindu Gouda (Yadav) family of Rekhpur village in Kalahandi District to Purusottam Bhoi and Pana Bhoi. His father is a farmer. He studied at Narla Panchyatsamiti High School. He enrolled in Madnpaur Rampur College and graduated from the Government Autonomous College in Bhawanipatna.

His career started while he was pursuing his degree. He participated in the Mahavid Sanskrutika Anusthan singing competition in 2002 and won first prize. He started learning Odissi from Guru Karunakar Dash in 2006 and four years later, he trained under Guru Santosh Kumar Das.

== Career ==
"I am extremely delighted to be considered for the award. This award is not for me but for the rich treasure of music and culture we have in this region. I will like to dedicate the award to my parents who have always supported me."

— Sarbeswar Bhoi on receiving Ustad Bismillah Khan Yuva Puraskar, June 2018

His first break came in 2006. He recorded ″″Pakhanupare Jharana Paani″″ with Subham Music and it made him a star. He sang "Likri Jhikri", "Lal Jhara Jhara" for the National Award-winning movie Aadim Vichar in 2014.

== Accolades ==
He received Ustad Bismillah Khan Yuva Puraskar 2017 for his contribution to the Sambalpuri Folk Dance and music from Sangeet Natak Akademi.

Year	Award	Category	Result	Ref
2017	Ustad Bismillah Khan Yuva Puraskar	Folk Dance & Music	Won	
