= Akshay Anantapadmanabhan =

Indian musician

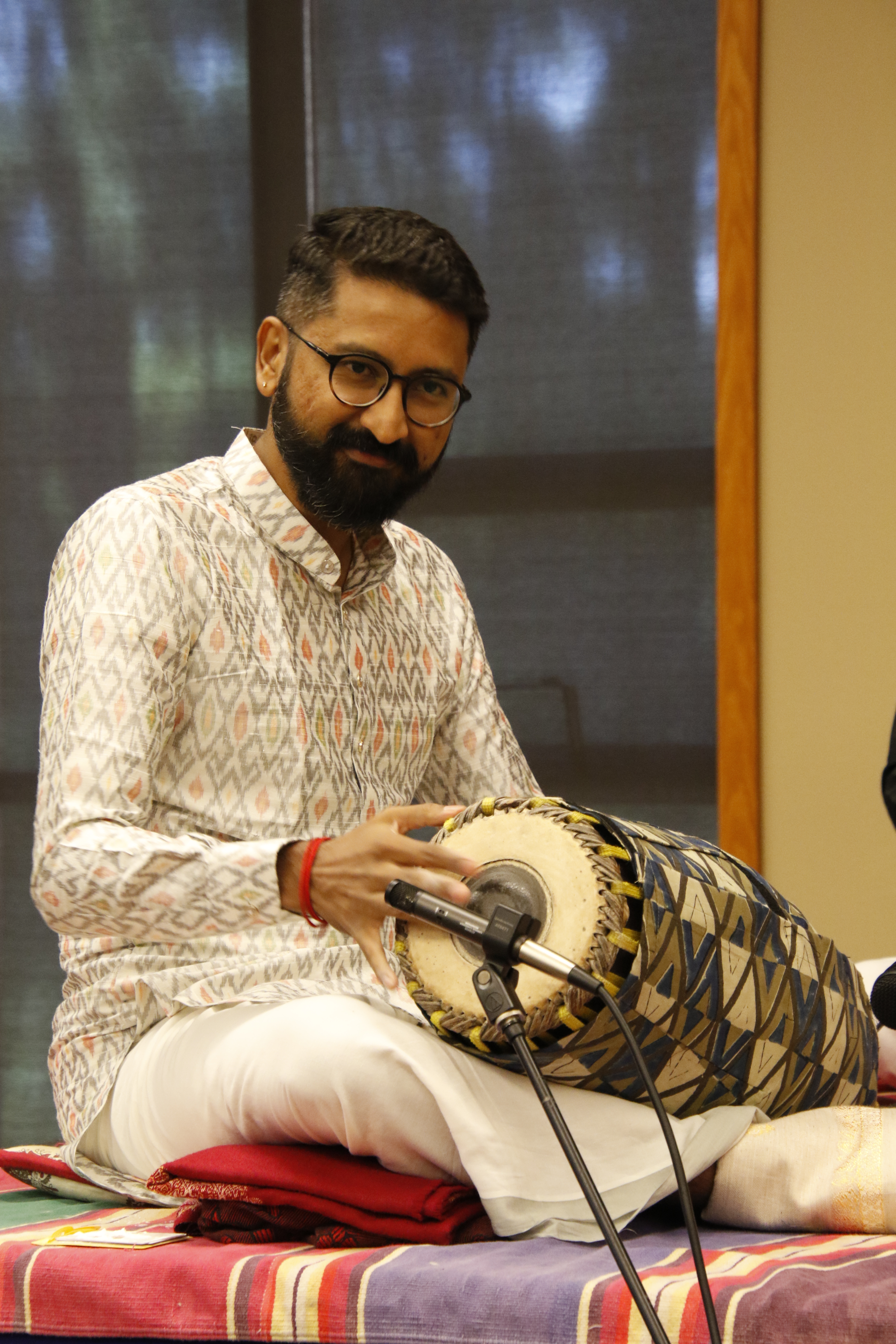
- Born: India
- Occupation: Musician
- Title: Mridangam artist

Akshay Anantapadmanabhan is an carnatic mridangam artist, composer and multi-percussionist.

== Musical career ==
In unique demonstrations of South Indian percussion, he has collaborated with rock, Latin jazz, American jazz, Hindustani, and jazz performers. He is an A-Grade artist of All India Radio, Chennai and a key component of the popular Indian Classical fusion groups "Carnatic 2.0 Reloaded" and "The Thayir Sadam Project." In his most recent solo project, "Re-imagining Indian Rhythms," Akshay explores the frontiers of Indian rhythms by fusing digital loopers and interactive graphics with traditional instruments like the mridangam, kanjira, konnakol, and bharathanatyam. He has given master lectures at NYUAD (Abu Dhabi), NYU, and CUNY (New York) on an introduction to Konnakol and Indian rhythm.

== Discography ==
- "Mylapore-Rap" In 2010, Akshay created a contemporary music video using ‘Konnakol’ (Indian vocal percussion) and re-contextualizing it as a hip-hop/rap genre.
- "Konnakol Playhouse" He worked with over 1000 kids across Bangalore, India to create a contemporary music video in 2010.
- "His Father's Voice" He performed mridangam in several tracks, including a solo track ‘Weapons of Love,’ for this feature film premiered in Hollywood in 2019.
- "Re-Imagining Indian Rhythms" In this avant-garde solo production, He focuses on the ideas of Indian rhythm that can be connected to ideas of Indian culture.

== Awards ==
- Ustad Bismillah khan yuva puraskar 2023 from the Sangeet Natak Akademi, Delhi.
