= Amitesh Grover =

Indian theatre director

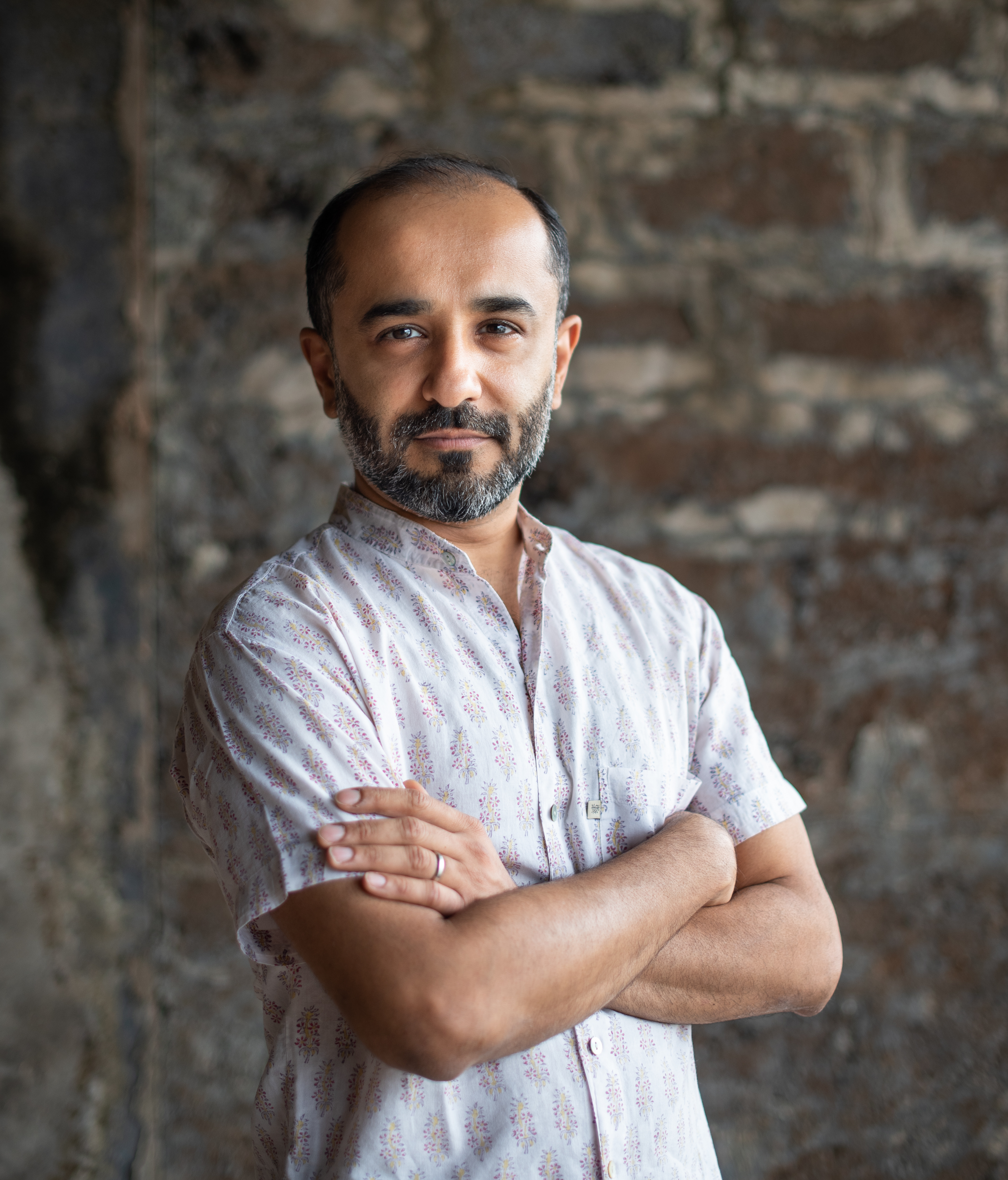
- Born: 1980 (age 45–46); New Delhi, India
- Education: University of the Arts London
- Known for: Theatre & Performance
- Notable work: The Money Opera, The Last Poet, Velocity Pieces
- Style: Experimental
- Spouse: Sarah Mariam
- Awards: Ustad Bismillah Khan Yuva Puraskar ,
- Website: https://amiteshgrover.com

Amitesh Grover (born 1980) is an Indian theatre director and Professor of theatre direction at the National School of Drama. He is known for his experimental theatre, performances, and installations. In 2008, Sangeet Natak Akademi awarded him Ustad Bismillah Khan Yuva Puraskar for his contribution to the field of theatre direction.

== Early life and education ==
Born in New Delhi, he completed his schooling from Sardar Patel Vidyalaya and his graduation at Delhi University. He earned a scholarship to study at National School of Drama, New Delhi in 2001, where he completed M.A. (Diploma) in Theatre Direction. In 2005, he received the Charles Wallace Scholarship to study in London, where he completed M.A. in Theatre and Performance from the University of the Arts London.

== Work ==
Grover is known for his innovative work in the field of theatre and performance. His work first attracted attention for integrating digital technology in live performances. In 2007, he directed Falk Richter's play Electronic City in which live camera feed, TV-sets and projections were used along with actors on stage. Other theatre presentations of his include Memorable Equinox (2007), Hamlet Quartet (2009), and Strange Lines (2010), in which motion tracking, real-time video feed and multimedia were integral elements of the performances. Ever since, his hybrid creations have gained a growing dedicated audience in India.

He gained acclaim for his "real-life" performances. Moving away from conventional theatre, Grover created participatory performances that brought real life and real people into the theatre. Social Gaming (2010–12) was an event Grover created in collaboration with British artist Alex Fleetwood, which connected audiences in different countries in real time through a series of social tasks and games. The Sleep Concert (2013–14) was a one-week long performance event of collective sleeping energies curated by Grover and his collaborators Frank Oberhausser and Shaunak Sen. Held over the course of several nights in multiple locations in New Delhi and Berlin, the audience was lulled into sleep with a set of carefully curated performances, participatory acts, and live-improvisations. The show was nominated for the Prix Ars Electronica award in Austria in 2016.

In Songs of Mourning (2013–16), Grover worked with a professional traditional Oppari mourner to stage an unscripted interview about the rituals and processes of expressing grief in India. The show travelled to various festivals in India and Europe. Extending real-life performances into his own life, he created Back To Work (2016–17) in which he went undercover in a technology company to work as an IT professional for a duration of six months. During his employment, in addition to his job he produced performances, CCTV-art, and a film. The art-works produced in this series was shown in an exhibition tilted ‘Hangar for the Passerby’ curated by Akansha Rastogi and commissioned by the Kiran Nadar Museum of Art.

His 2018 play Raag Darbari, based on the satirical Hindi novel by Shrilal Shukla illustrating the failing values in post-Independence Indian society, is seen as a return to story-telling and conventional theatre in his career. His show Table Radica (2019-ongoing), which followed soon after, presents the personal strife and the public triumph of an artist working in such a society. The show, directed and performed by Grover himself, used archival and edible elements to focus on the life of the popular Indian playwright and director Habib Tanvir.

In the pandemic years, when theatres were shut down in India, Grover turned to the digital space to create his work. In 2020, he created The Last Poet, a cyber-play that centres around a missing poet in a dystopian society, making references to the political threats that writers and artists encounter. The show took place on the web, in which the audience were taken into a 3-D virtual city and provided with options to choose different spaces, called rooms, in which they watched live performances. The show premiered at SA Virtual Festival and was later shown at the Tata Literature Live Festival 2021. It was the official entry at IMPACT 21 Festival held at MT Space for Performing Arts, Canada and the Segal Festival of Theatre & Film, USA.

Grover is also known for conceptual art and installations. In Wounding (2021) — for which he received the MASH FICA award for New Media Artist — Grover transformed a family archive of pictures into a narrative about the 1947 Partition. The images experienced visual glitches when individual stories were added to the ASCII representations of the scanned images, presenting "brilliant hues of intentionally glitched, wounded photographs." As a special commission for the third edition of the Chennai Photo Biennale, Grover created a series of imageless photographs drawn entirely from his imagination and memory titled All That We Saw. This work was shown as part of the digital showcase running across 2021–22 on the biennale platform as well as galleries and exhibitions across India.

In a public art installation titled Velocity Pieces (2019—ongoing), Grover used billboard as a medium to express ideas of protest and dissent through action-poems. A large billboard is erected on Kasturba Gandhi Marg in central Delhi, where Grover's board-poems can be read till date.

His most recent theatre production is The Money Opera. Set in an abandoned building, it is a collection of multiple stories performed by actors and real-life professionals that presents a layered critique of capitalism. The show premiered in Goa at the Serendipity Arts Festival in 2022 and travelled to New Delhi in 2023.

Grover's work has been shown at the National Theatre (London), MT Space (Canada), Haus der Kulturen der Welt (Berlin), Segal Center Festival on Theatre and Performance (USA), Foundation of Indian Contemporary Art, Arts Centre Melbourne, TATA Literature Festival Mumbai, Kiran Nadar Museum of Art, Bharat Rang Mahotsav, Cornell University, Prithvi Theatre Festival, Serendipity Arts Festival. He has been selected for artist residencies at PACT Zollverein (Germany), Tokyo Culture Creation Project (Japan), and Berliner Theatertreffen. He has been commissioned by the Chennai Photo Biennale and by Australia's Sydney-based 4A Centre for Contemporary Asian Art.

He was the artistic director for International Theatre Festival of Kerala for 2020 and 2021 and the Ranga Shankara Festival, Bangalore in 2021. He has given artist talks at Lasalle College of the Arts (Singapore), Asian Performing Arts Market (Australia) and Hong Kong University.

== Awards ==
- Ustad Bismillah Khan National Award For Direction
- MASH FICA New Media Award
- Swiss Residency Award for South Asian Artist
- Charles Wallace Award (U.K.)

Nominations

- Arte Laguna Prize (Italy)
- Prix Ars Electronica Award (Austria)
- Forecast Award (Germany)

== Publications ==
- Performance Making and the Archive, Ed. Ashutosh Potdar & Sharmistha Saha, ISBN 9780367195601, Routledge India, 2022
- Pandemic of Perspectives, Ed. Rimple Mehta, Sandali Thakur, Debaroti Chakraborty, ISBN 9781003320524, Routledge India
- Postdramatic Theatre and India, Ed. Ashis Sengupta, ISBN 9781350154094, Bloomsbury Publishing
- Why Curate Live Arts? TURBA, The Journal for Global Practices in Live Arts Curation, Ed. Dena Davida, ISSN 2693-0129, Berghahn Journals, New York & Berlin
- ISSUE, Ed. Venka Purushothaman, ISSN 2315-4802, LaSalle College of the Arts, Singapore
- Improvised Futures: Encountering the Body in Performance, Ed. Ranjana Dave, ISBN 978-81-945348-2-2, Tullika Books
- Hakara, Ed. Ashutosh Potdar, ISSN 2581-9976
- Imaginable Worlds: Art, Crisis, and Global Futures, Ed. Orianna Cacchione, Nandita Jaishankar, and Arushi Vats, Smart Museum of Art, The University of Chicago
- Moving Focus: New Perspectives on Modern & Contemporary Art, Ed. Mortimer Chaterjee, ISBN 978-1-78884-173-3, ACC Art Books, USA & Canada
- The Indian Express - A Voice, Under 35: The Murder of A Scene
