= Praveen Kumar (dancer) =

Indian dancer

- Born: January 25, 1971 (age 54)
- Occupations: dancer, choreographer, teacher
- Known for: Bharatanatyam

P. Praveen Kumar (born 25 January 1971) is an Indian dancer specialized in the classical dance form Bharatanatyam.

== Early life and career ==
Kumar holds a Bachelor of Commerce and was awarded a state government scholarship to pursue dance. He learned Bharatanatyam under the dancers S. Narmada and C. V. Chandrasekhar.

Kumar has been an 'A' graded artist on Doordarshan since 2002 and was awarded the Ustad Bismillah Khan Yuva Puraskar in 2010. He serves on the panel of classical performing artists for cultural missions and festivals abroad for the Indian Council for Cultural Relations.

Kumar had been named the best dancer of the 2019 dance festival by the Madras Music Academy.

He teaches at the Chithkala School of Dance in Bengaluru.
