= Chandramukhi 2 =

2023 Indian film by P. Vasu

- Theatrical release poster
- Directed by: P. Vasu
- Written by: P. Vasu
- Produced by: Subaskaran Allirajah
- Starring: Raghava Lawrence; Kangana Ranaut; Lakshmi Menon
- Cinematography: R. D. Rajasekhar
- Edited by: Anthony
- Music by: M. M. Keeravani
- Production company: Lyca Productions
- Distributed by: AA Films
- Release date: 28 September 2023
- Running time: 172 minutes
- Country: India
- Language: Tamil
- Budget: ₹65 crore
- Box office: est. ₹52.10 crore

Chandramukhi 2 is a 2023 Indian Tamil-language comedy horror film written and directed by P. Vasu, and produced by Subaskaran Allirajah under Lyca Productions. It is a sequel to the 2005 film Chandramukhi. The film stars Raghava Lawrence, Kangana Ranaut and Lakshmi Menon along with an ensemble supporting cast including Vadivelu (reprising his role from the previous film), Radhika Sarathkumar, Mahima Nambiar, Srushti Dange, Rao Ramesh, Subiksha Krishnan, Suresh Chandra Menon, Ravi Mariya, Vignesh, and Y. G. Mahendran in pivotal roles.

The film was officially announced in 2020 with Sun Pictures producing, though by June 2022 Lyca had taken over production. Principal photography began in that July, and wrapped by mid-August 2023. The music is composed by M. M. Keeravani, while the cinematography and editing are handled by R. D. Rajasekhar and Anthony, respectively. Chandramukhi 2 was released on 28 September 2023 to a poor critical and commercial response, in contrast to the success of its predecessor.

== Plot ==
Ranganayaki, the matriarch of a wealthy family, navigates through a series of misfortunes alongside her family members. Her household includes her elder brother, his son with his family, her younger brother, and his family. She also has four daughters, out of which Gayathri, Priya, and Divya live with her. The family faces a major setback when her elder daughter elopes, and a plane crash kills her and her spouse. Further calamities include a mysterious fire at the family's factory and Divya getting paralyzed in a car accident, postponing her engagement.

Seeking solutions, Ranganayaki consults their family astrologer, Guruji, who advises a prayer at their ancestral temple in Vettaiyapuram. The prayer requires the presence of the entire family, including her elder daughter's orphaned children, now under Pandiyan's care. Although hesitant, the family follows Guruji's advice and heads to Vettaiyapuram.

Upon arrival, they lease the Vettaiyapuram Palace for 48 days from its new caretaker, Senthil's uncle Murugesan, and move in but are warned against venturing into the southern part of the palace. Pandian meets Lakshmi, who lives in the outhouse with her grandfather and tells him that exploring the palace is her wish. He tells her to meet him that night and that he will allow her into the palace. Curiosity leads Priya into the forbidden area, where she unwittingly releases Chandramukhi's spirit from a rangoli. Lakshmi gets caught by Gayathri while exploring the palace. Pandian informs the family of Lakshmi's wish to explore the palace. Meanwhile, the family discovers their temple in ruins. Pandiyan cleans the temple, but an unfortunate turn of events leads to a fire breaking out within the temple premises. It inadvertently unleashes Vettaiyan's spirit much to the dismay of Chandramukhi, causing chaos to sweep through the palace. Upon his return, Pandiyan shares the unnerving news with the family that Chandramukhi has possessed one of the women in the household. Pandian tells them that an old sage living near the temple had informed him that a similar incident had occurred 17 years prior. Murugesan reveals that the incident did occur 17 years ago but everything was resolved then. When Guruji arrives, Murugesan elaborates on Ganga's previous psychological affliction where she imagines herself as Chandramukhi. However, the real Chandramukhi has resurfaced, escalating the threat.

The family then proceeds to Vettaiyan's courtroom, the significant location where Ramachandra Achariyar and Saravanan had previously exorcised Ganga. (Note: As depicted in Chandramukhi (2005)) Upon inspection, Guruji discovers that someone has already entered the forbidden room thereby unleashing Chandramukhi's spirit for real. Initial suspicions fall on Lakshmi due to her earlier explorations but the family is shocked to see that Divya is the person possessed by Chandramukhi. A miraculous event follows as Divya regains her ability to walk which elates her but leaves the family in distress. Priya admits that she is the one who entered the forbidden room and found the anklet on the floor. Guruji explains that a bead from Chandramukhi's anklet facilitated Divya's possession that she had worn as she had a penchant for collecting antiques. Next morning, Pandian sees Lakshmi sitting outside her outhouse. She reveal that she was unable to sleep last night after seeing Divya possessed by Chandramukhi. Pandian tells her that even he and the entire family were unable to sleep either. Pandian discovers that Murugesan and the manager are hiding in fear inside Lakshmi's outhouse and successfully chases them out using his tricks. Eventually, Lakshmi and Pandian fall madly in love with each other.

In a twist of fate after the family leaves to the temple for the prayers, Divya starts driving her car which shocks everyone. Pandiyan stumbles upon a secret room below Vettaiyan's room and becomes possessed by Vettaiyan by sitting on the throne. As Chandramukhi still possesses Divya, she attempts to harm Ranganayaki, her nieces and nephews by almost driving the car off the hill but a possessed Pandiyan thwarts her attempts and she manages to stop the car just in time. Delving into the past, Guruji learns from a sage about the bitter enmity between Vettaiyan and Chandramukhi.

King Vettaiyan and his commander Sengottaiyan had conquered the Vijayanagara Kingdom, where Vettaiyan was smitten by a dancer named Chandramukhi. He requested Sengottaiyan to forcibly bring Chandramukhi to Vettaiyapuram. When Sengottaiyan too becomes enamoured with Chandramukhi's beauty after seeing her near a pool, it ignites a confrontation between Vettaiyan and Sengottaiyan, resulting in Vettaiyan's beheading by Sengottaiyan. Subsequently, Sengottaiyan proclaims himself as king, adopting the name Vettaiyan. Despite Chandramukhi's pleas about her love for Gunasekaran, Vettaiyan keeps Chandramukhi captive. In a tragic event, Vettaiyan beheads Gunasekaran, and Chandramukhi is burnt alive. However, she returns as a vengeful ghost tormenting Vettaiyan to the brink of despair. Unable to bear the torment, Vettaiyan retreats to his secret room and eventually meets his end through a fatal snakebite.

Through the sage, Pandiyan learns that he had become possessed by Vettaiyan after sitting on his throne. Lakshmi and the entire family are devastated to know that Pandiyan is now possessed by Vettaiyan. A fierce battle unfolds between Divya (possessed by Chandramukhi) and Pandiyan (possessed by Vettaiyan). In a sacrificial act, the sage Rudhrayya intervenes to save Pandiyan and sacrifices himself, thereby ending Chandramukhi's reign of terror. Guruji later reveals to Pandiyan that the sage had collected Chandramukhi's ashes and sealed them in her portrait. The sage, whom Chandramukhi cursed to be beheaded only by her, saw this as an opportunity to end his curse and willingly sacrificed himself to cease the torment.

With the spirits laid to rest, Ranganayaki's family finally performs the prayer at their deity temple, and everyone is happy to see Divya completely cured and back on her feet. Upon completing the prayer, the family departs from the palace with Pandiyan. The ordeal concludes on a happy note as Pandiyan reunites with Lakshmi and leaves the palace with her and the children, thereby ending the family's harrowing yet enlightening journey.

== Cast ==
- Raghava Lawrence in a dual role as
  - Pandiyan/Sengottaiyan (Vettaiyan)
  - Arvind as Young Vettaiyan (on Chandramukhi’s dream) (deleted scene)
- Kangana Ranaut as Chandramukhi (Voice dubbed by Savitha Reddy)
- Lakshmi Menon as Divya / Chandramukhi (possessed) (Voice dubbed by Meenalotchni)
- Mahima Nambiar as Lakshmi
- Vadivelu as Murugesan
- Radhika Sarathkumar as Ranganayaki
- Srushti Dange as Priya (Voice dubbed by Renuka Kathir)
- Subiksha Krishnan as Gayathri
- Suresh Chandra Menon as Ranganayaki's elder brother
- Ravi Mariya as Ranganayaki's elder brother's son
- Vignesh as Ranganayaki's younger brother
- Manasvi Kottachi as Ranganayaki Jr, Ranganayaki's granddaughter
- Sanjiv V as Kalam, Ranganayaki's grandson
- Rao Ramesh as Guruji
- Shatru as Vettaiyan
- Y. G. Mahendran as Temple Priest
- Mithun Shyam as Gunasekaran
- C. Ranganathan as Lakshmi's father
- Manobala as Fake Exorcist
- R. S. Shivaji as Contractor Gopal
- T. M. Karthik as Manager
- Rajitha as Palace Servant
- Cool Suresh as House Servant
- Ayyappa P. Sharma as Rudraiyya, Sengottaiyan's Mahaguru
- Kaashvin Karthik
- Jyothika as Ganga Senthilnathan (uncredited, archive footage from Chandramukhi)

== Production ==
=== Development ===
P. Vasu had plans for a sequel to Chandramukhi as early as September 2012. In January 2020, Vasu stated that he had completed the script for the sequel and a producer has come forward to produce the film. It was reported that Raghava Lawrence would play main role in the film, which was confirmed in April by himself via Twitter, where also stated the film is produced by Sun Pictures. In June 2022, Lawrence announced that Lyca Productions had taken over producing the film, Vadivelu joined the casting and editing, cinematography and art works would be handled by Anthony, R. D. Rajasekhar and Thota Tharani. Kala was chosen as the dance choreographer, again as she choreographed for the first film.

=== Casting ===
Kangana Ranaut met Vasu to discuss another film. While inquiring Vasu about who he cast for the role of Chandramukhi, Vasu told her that no one had been cast yet and Ranaut asked Vasu if she could play the role. Ranaut said this was the first time she ever asked for a role, rather than being approached for one. She was announced as the lead female in November 2022, and was reportedly paid ₹20 crore (equivalent to ₹22 crore or US$2.3 million in 2026), and Lawrence ₹15 crore (equivalent to ₹16 crore or US$1.7 million in 2026). Vadivelu was the only actor to reprise his role from the first film. Action choreography, cinematography and editing are handled by Kanal Kannan, R. D. Rajasekhar and Anthony, respectively.

=== Filming ===
Principal photography commenced in July 2022 in Mysore, and wrapped up the first schedule in August. In March 2023, Ranaut joined the team to shoot the climax song, which she was seen rehearsing in January, and wrapped up her portions the same month. Radhika had wrapped her portions in May. In June, the team had announced that principal photography wrapped. A song sequence was later shot in August, marking the conclusion of filming.

=== Post-production ===
In June, the team announced that the film is releasing on Ganesh Chaturthi. Lawrence started dubbing his portions in July.

== Music ==
Chandramukhi 2

Soundtrack album by M. M. Keeravani
- Released: 25 August 2023
- Recorded: 2022–2023
- Studios: JB Recording Studio, Chennai
- Genre: film soundtrack
- Length: 34:58
- Language: Tamil
- Label: Sony Music India
- Producer: M. M. Keeravani

M. M. Keeravani chronology
| Bimbisara (2022) | Chandramukhi 2 (2023) | Naa Saami Ranga (2024) |

The music and background scores are composed by M. M. Keeravani, in his first Tamil film after 20 years; as his last Tamil film was Student Number 1 (2003). The film also marks as his second collaboration with Vasu and first with Raghava. The audio rights for the film were purchased by Sony Music India. Keeravani used his original name in title credits after Vasu insisted him to do so though he was credited as Maragathamani in his previous Tamil ventures. (Note: Even before Chandramukhi 2, Keeravani was credited by his real name in the title credits of Kondattam (1998).) The first single "Swagathaanjali" was released on 11 August 2023, The second single "Moruniye" on 22 August 2023.

Keeravani later stated that there were remaining nine songs to be released apart from the first single that was launched earlier, bringing a total of 10 songs for the film. The audio launch was held at Jeppiaar Engineering College on 25 August 2023.

Tamil version

Track listing
| No. | Title | Lyrics | Singer(s) | Length |
|---|---|---|---|---|
| 1. | "Swagathaanjali" | Chaitanya Prasad | Sreenidhi Tirumala | 3:49 |
| 2. | "Moruniye" | Vivek | S. P. Charan, Harika Narayan | 4:27 |
| 3. | "Nee Kosame" | Chaitanya Prasad | Mohana Bhogaraju | 2:42 |
| 4. | "Thori Bori" | Yugabharathi | Haricharan, Amala Chebolu | 4:29 |
| 5. | "Raa Raa" (Happy) | Chaitanya Prasad | Ramya Behara | 2:37 |
| 6. | "Podhum Podhum" | Vivek | Pradeep Kumar, Aditi Bhavaraju | 4:49 |
| 7. | "Ragalaya" | Madhan Karky | Niteesh Kondiparthi, Aditi Bhavaraju | 4:17 |
| 8. | "Raa Raa" (Angry) | Chaitanya Prasad | Ramya Behara | 2:48 |
| 9. | "Raa Raa" (sad) | Chaitanya Prasad | Ramya Behara | 2:41 |
| 10. | "Mukhi Mukhi" | Vidhya Mahesh | Aditya Iyengar | 2:20 |
| Total length: | | | | 34:58 |

Telugu track listing
| No. | Title | Lyrics | Singer(s) | Length |
|---|---|---|---|---|
| 1. | "Aattanaayagi" | Madhan Karky | Sreenidhi Tirumala | 3:49 |
| 2. | "Moruniye" | Ramajogayya Sastry | S. P. Charan, Harika Narayan | 4:27 |
| 3. | "Nee Kaanave" | Madhan Karky | Sony Komanduri | 2:42 |
| 4. | "Thori Bori" | Bhuvana Chandra | Arun Kaundinya, Amala Chebolu | 4:29 |
| 5. | "Vaarai" (Happy) | Madhan Karky | Ramya Behara | 2:37 |
| 6. | "Paadhum Paadhum" | Chandra Bose | Sai Charan, Aditi Bhavaraju | 4:49 |
| 7. | "Merupula" | Chaitanya Prasad | Niteesh Kondiparthi, Aditi Bhavaraju | 4:17 |
| 8. | "Vaarai" (Angry) | Madhan Prasad | Ramya Behara | 2:48 |
| 9. | "Vaarai" (Sad) | Madhan Karky | Ramya Behara | 2:41 |
| 10. | "Mukhi Mukhi" | Vidhya Mahesh | Aditya Iyengar | 2:20 |
| Total length: | | | | 34:58 |

== Release ==
=== Release ===
Chandramukhi 2 was initially scheduled to release on 15 September 2023, coinciding with Ganesh Chaturthi, but it was postponed to 28 September due to 450-shots from the film disappearing during post-production works, which were found after four days.

=== Home media ===
The film began streaming on Netflix from 26 October 2023.

== Reception ==
=== Box office ===
Made on a budget of ₹60–₹65 crore, Chandramukhi 2 grossed just over ₹40 crore globally, emerging a commercial failure.

=== Critical response ===
The film was heavily panned by critics.

Priyanka Sundar of Firstpost gave the film 1 out of 5 stars and wrote, "Forget refreshing storyline, with such lazy writing, it truly would be better to tune into the previous film on OTT, instead of spending currency on the ever-rising ticket prices". Janani K from India Today gave the film 1.5 out of 5 stars and wrote, "Chandramukhi 2 is mediocrity at its best. We get to hear a romantic number that goes 'Podhum Podhum' (transl. Enough, enough) in the second half. We feel you! Podhum!". M. Suganth of The Times of India gave the film 2.5 out of 5 stars and wrote, "Those who just want a momentary diversion might find it passable while those looking for something more will feel underwhelmed". Kalyani Pandiyan S of Hindustan Times praised Menon's performance in the film but criticised Lawrence's comic timing and noted that Ranaut could not perform to the level of Jyothika. Sowmya Rajendran of The News Minute gave the film 1 out of 5 stars and wrote, "The film unfolds in TV serial fashion with close-ups, reaction shots, and melodramatic dialogues while riding heavily on M. M. Keeravani's nostalgia-inducing score".

In a negative review, the critic at Hindu Tamil Thisai warned the makers against using the name of a work that has been well received in all its forms like Manichitrathazhu, Apthamitra and Chandramukhi and making a film that has not even a single memorable feature. Sruthi Ganapathy Raman of Film Companion called it a "poorly-acted" sequel and wrote, "Apart from its title card and Keeravani's accompanying haunting note, nothing about the sequel reminds us of the collective horror we felt 15 years ago". Srinivasa Ramanujam of The Hindu called it a "mildly" entertaining film. Saki Yutukuri of Telangana Today wrote, "Chandramukhi 2 can be called either a remake or a copy film, but definitely not a sequel as it has every element similar, even at the ground level. Kirubhakar Purushothaman of The Indian Express gave the film 1 out of 5 stars and called it a "shoddy" horror film which is tainting the legacy of the original film. Baradwaj Rangan called it a "generic" sequel, criticising its similarities to its predecessor. Anusha Sundar of Cinema Express gave the film 1.5 out of 5 stars and wrote, "Chandramukhi 2 fails to bring anything fresh and ends up delivering a colour-remastered copy of its predecessor". B. V. S. Prakash of Deccan Chronicle gave the film 2 out of 5 stars and dismissed it as "tacky" sequel of an evergreen hit. Krishna Selvaseelan of the Tamil Guardian gave the film 1 out of 5 stars, writing the film was a "shameless slap in the face of its predecessor".
