= Manoj Kumar Das =

Indian musician

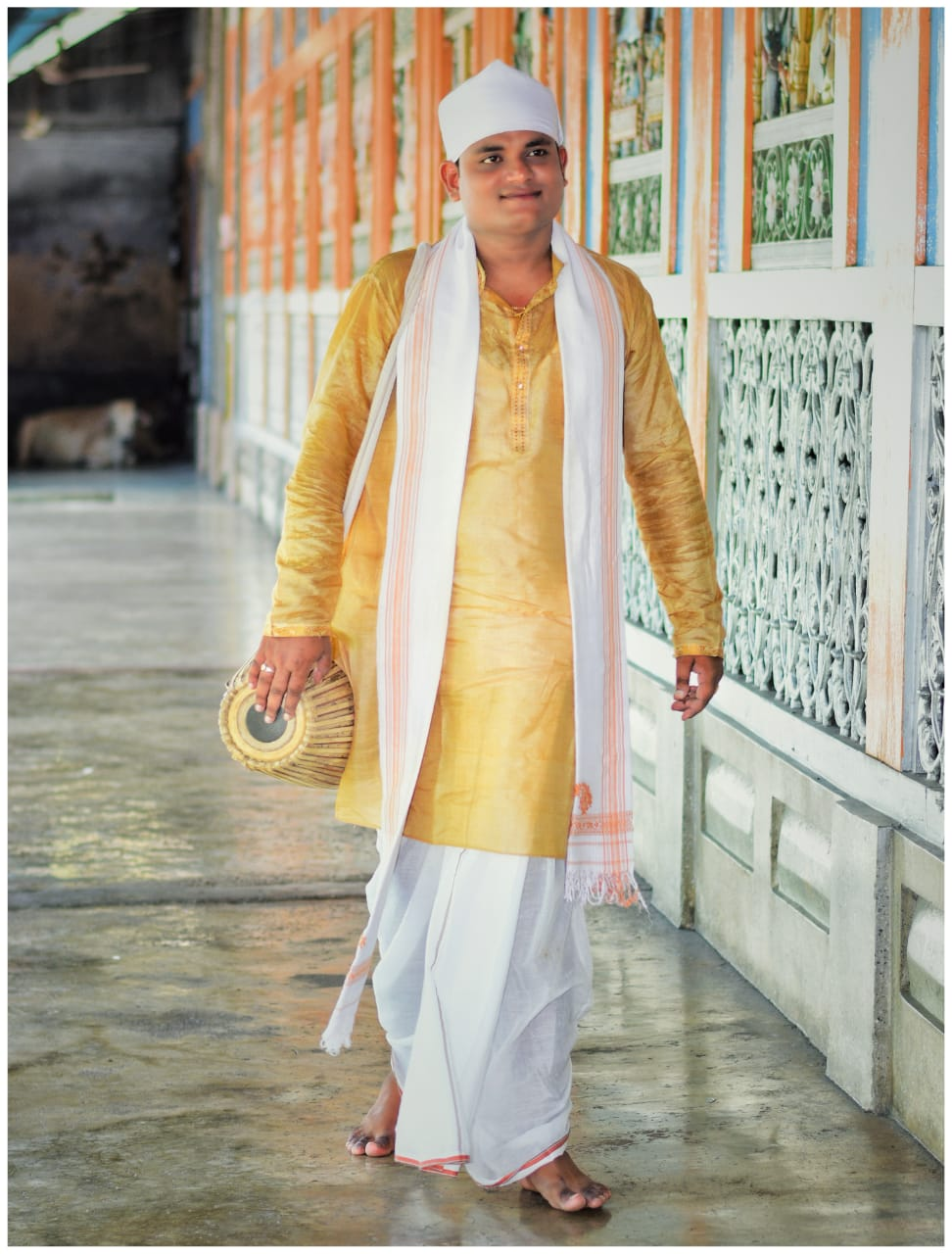

Background information
- Born: Barpeta, India
- Instruments: Khol, Dholak

Manoj Kumar Das is an Indian musician from Barpeta, Assam. As a Khol player, he is known to have contributed towards the propagation of the culture of Satra (Ekasarana Dharma). Das, who is associated with the Barpeta Satra, have been awarded the Ustad Bismillah Khan Yuva Puraskar in 2018 for his contribution in the field of traditional music of Assam.

== Awards and accolades ==
Das practised the Khol under the guidance of Jagannath Bayan, the Borbayan or the chief bayan (instrumentalist) of Barpeta Satra, who was conferred the Sangeet Natak Akademi Award in 2017. Apart from being an awardee of Ustad Bismillah Khan Yuva Puraskar, he is a recipient of the National Young artist Scholarship award, 2014, and Junior Research Fellowship 2017-18 under the Ministry of culture, Government of India. He is also a regular artist of All India Radio, Guwahati. He has performed at the University of Kelaniya, Sri Lanka.

== As a musician ==
In 2014, Das establishes his own training institute of Khol in Barpeta where more than 200 students, including women from different backgrounds, are taught. He provides free training to students from poor family. He wrote a book titled Khol (Part-1), where aspects of the instrument are detailed. A research project titled ''Exploration and Documentation of the notation of the Khol Rhythm, Traditionally being offered before the alter in Barpeta Satra for the last 432 years'' is carried on by him under the ministry of culture, Government of India and Sangeet Natak Akademi.

== See also ==
- Ustad Bismillah Khan Yuva Puraskar
- Culture of Assam
- Satra (Ekasarana Dharma)
- Barpeta Satra
- Khol
- Sattriya
