= Anurupa Roy =

Indian puppeteer (born 1977)

- Born: 10 March 1977 (age 49); New Delhi, India
- Occupations: Lecturer, puppeteer, artist
- Years active: 2004–present

Anurupa Roy is an Indian puppeteer, puppet designer and director of puppet theater. Roy views puppetry as not "manipulating dolls with strings" but an amalgam of plastic and performing arts where sculptures, masks, figures, materials, paper theatre found objects and narratives come together with music, movement and storytelling in many styles to create the theater where humans and puppets are co actors. She started at her group Katkatha in 1998 which was registered as the Katkatha Puppet Arts Trust 2006. She has directed over many shows for children and adults ranging from the Ramayana and Mahabharata to Shakespearean comedy to the Humayun-nama. For her puppetry is the theater of dead materials that turns the mundane into magic whether a shoe, a twine or wool, old newspapers and found objects can turn into living characters in a puppet performance. The puppets used by Katkatha are mainly based on the Bunraku technique rod puppets, materials, masks and shadow puppets that range from three inches to forty feet in size. The shows have toured across India to festivals like Bharangam, International Theatre Festival of Kerala and venues like Birlasabhaghar Prithvi and to countries Europe, North America and South Asia . Anurupa works as a consultant in arts for public health, with a special focus on work on gender and sexuality for young adults and youth. peace-building and education projects for communities, schools, juvenile homes, in conflict zones like Kashmir, Sri Lanka and Manipur . She has designed puppet exhibitions for Serendipity Arts Festival , The National Museum in Delhi, the Children’s Museum at Prince of Wales Museum(CSMVS) Mumbai She is a recipient of the Ustad Bismillah Khan Yuva Puraskar ine Puppetry (2006). National Award in Puppetry (2006) and the Shankar Nag Theatre Award in 2017 She is a 2023 British Council CLORE Chevening Fellow.

== Academic qualification ==
- School – Sardar Patel Vidyalaya, New Delhi.
- Graduation – Lady Shriram College – B.A (Hons) History – University of Delhi
- Post Graduation – M.A History – Lady Shriram college –South campus – University of Delhi

== Puppet theatre qualification ==
- Diploma in Puppet theatre from DI Dramatiska Institutet for Film, TV, Drama and Radio, at Stockholm University, Sweden, at the Dept of Puppet Theatre guided by Prof Micheal Meschke in 2001 & Arne Hogsander, Thomas Mirstram, Thomas Lindquist
- Diploma in Guaratelle, traditional glove puppetry, from La Scoula Della
- Guaratelle (School of Traditional Glove puppetry) in Naples, Italy under Bruno Leone in 2002

== Major theatre productions as director ==
- 1998 – The Flowering Tree – Based on the Kannada folk tale Flowering Tree and commissioned by the Foundation for Universal Responsibility of HH Dalai Lama.
- 1999 – Her Voice – A collaborative performance with Bharatnatyam dancer Geeta Chandran the show presented the Mahabharata from the eyes of Draupadi.
- 2001 – Half a Kingdom – Based on an Icelandic folk tale of the same name this was a table top show for children.
- 2002 – Almost 12th Night – Based on Shakespeare's comedy The Twelfth Night this adaptation looks at the bards play from a gender perspective.
- 2003 – Durga – An excerpt of Bibhuti Bhushan Bannerji's famous novel 'Pather Panchali' a solo performance.
- 2004 – Virus Ka Tamasha – Musical puppet performance based on the theme of stigma attached to HIV and AIDS
- 2005 – Kashmir Project – Based on testimonials of Kashmiri women from the valley gathered through workshops held in Kashmir.
- 2006 – About Ram – Performance based on Bhavbhuti's Ramayana.
- 2007 – Magic Blue – A collaboration with dancer Shagun Bhutani the show has giant puppets of 3–10 meters and presents stories from Krishna's childhood
- 2008 – The Little Blue Planet – A non-verbal children's performance about global warming.
- 2009 – Bollywood Bandwagon – Multimedia show satiring the Mumbai film industry.
- 2011 – Anecdotes and Allegories by Gulbadan Begum – This performance is based on the autobiography of the Mughal emperor Humayun written by his sister Gulbadan Begum.
- 2012 – Life in Progress – A series of images created with 20 kilos of newspaper on stage. This performance has no dialogue or music.

== Awards, recognition and fellowships ==
Researcher in Residence – 2011 – Deutsche Forum DFP in Bochum, Germany. New Performance Grant – 2010 – India Foundation for the Arts for the performance'Anecdotes and Allegories by Gulbadan Begum' Prohelvetia – Artist in residence for 2009 – To work at Rote Fabrik in Zurich as An artist-in-residence. Ustad Bismillah Khan Yuva Puraskar 2007 – National award for contribution to puppet theatre. Bestowed by the Sangeet Natak Akademi, an autonomous body funded by the Ministry of Culture, India.

Research fellowship at Institute International de la Marionette Charleville- Mezeires, in France in the area of "Evolution of European Puppetry in the 19th and 20th century and the influences of the East" Collaborative Performance Grant 2006 – India Foundation for the Arts – From India Foundation for the Arts for puppetry and animation to create About Ram. Fellow of Peace – WISCOMP for 2005– For working on a puppetry for healing project in the village of Beejbehara in Kashmir. This project entailed three trauma therapy workshops spread over seven months using puppet, mask and theatre exercises, and storytelling. The project aimed to reclaim folklore and oral tradition relating to the syncretic culture of Kashmir with the young women of Beejbehara. The stories collected from Kashmiri women from varied backgrounds and the folklore collected from the Beejbehara were then woven into a performance titled "The Kashmir Project" which brings back Lal Ded the Sufi poet from the 14th century to journey once again through Kashmir as the witness to the present day conflict and the symbol of possible healing.

UCLA APPEX – Asia Pacific Performing Artists fellowship 2004 to participate in an artists collaborative workshop in Bali, Indonesia, for 2 months and collaborate with 15 other artists from the Asia-Pacific region. This workshop was a University of California, Dept of Performing Arts initiative to enable experiments with other performing artists and to start a dialogue between the artists within Asia and with American artists. The performing artists were from Malaysia, Indonesia, China, India, the Philippines and the US.

== Workshops conducted ==
Youth and community-based projects – peacebuilding

2013– Workshop with youth in conflict zone Manipur- Churachandpur-(with NGO Standing Together to Enable Peace STEP) Puppetry workshop with youth from different tribes in Churachandpur district to create inter tribe dialogue and understanding. The workshop engaged with youth from Paythei, Naga and Kuki backgrounds who have been involved in conflicts with each other in Manipur for 22 years. The workshop aimed at using the arts to open dialogue and question stereotypes about each other. The youth created a giant puppet performance at the end of the workshop which has been performed for over 2000 people in the district. Sri Lanka – With Peace Development Institute – Sri Lanka – PDI-SL -Workshop with Tamil, Muslim and Sinhalese youth leaders to explore ideas of arts and peace building. The six-day workshop also trained these youth leaders to become change makers in their own community by training to do puppeteer based interventions in their own community.

2012 – Sri Lanka – With Peace Development Institute- Sri Lanka- PDI-SL Workshop with clinical psychologists and community workers- Conducted art based interventions using masks, drama, puppets and the systems of archetypes, power and status and cycles of violence. These workshops were conducted in partnership with drama therapist Vikramjeet Sinha. 2011 – Puppet interventions in Juvenile remand homes in Delhi where puppets were used to do process work with youth and change behaviour. The project lasted four months.(with NGO Standing Together to Enable Peace STEP) 2013 – Gender, Youth and Identity – with PRAVAH a youth-based NGO-created gender- and identity-based shows especially post the Delhi gang rape and the reaction to the same. The show is now a YouTube film and teaching aid for gender workers who want to open discussion on complex gender issues. 2011 – Mujhe bhi gino – Count me in – Initiated by the NGO CREA this project was traveling performance which traveled through rural Jharkhand and UP on a truck to 40 villages and challenged the behavior of favoring the male child and the exclusion of women in the socio political lives of the country. 2000–2006 – Almost 12th Night and Her Voice – Are Katkatha's two shows that question gender stereotypes, the former does this by re-looking at Shakespeare's play Twelfth night and the latter re looks at the Indian classic Mahabharata from the woman's point of view Consultant PLAN-India – For a HIV and AIDS Awareness Package (HAAP), a 14-month project which started in February 2006 with the intention of working with HIV-infected and -affected children and children who are in a high-risk group in 5 high prevalent states of India to create awareness and finally create an awareness and stigma-reduction package which will be by children and for children. The package uses stories created by children using puppets to spread awareness about HIV/AIDS and raise issues of Stigma and Discrimination. 2004 – Virus Ka Tamashah – Show based on Stigma in HIV/AIDS- This show has completed 200 shows and has been performed for over 50,000 people at stadia, parks, bus stops, schools, colleges, festivals etc.

== As faculty ==
TIE Company- National School of Drama- Annual Production director −2012 directed non-verbal puppet performance for children titled 'Across the Sea' using giant puppets and music. Guest Lecturer National School of Drama Agartala Chapter- For Theatre in Education module Guest Lecturer National School of Drama Bangalore Chapter – TIE course and Actors training course at NSD Bangalore chapter years 2012 and 2013 respectively. Visiting lecturer – Mass Communications Research Centre- Jamia Milia Islamia- Dept of Communication- Traditional media course- Puppet Theatre general secretary UNIMA-India- from 2008– 13 Indian chapter of the Union Internationale de la Marionette- international union for puppeteers in existence since 1929. International Executive committee member of UNIMA (Union Del la Internationale Marionette) at 2004 -2008. The International Union of Puppeteers with a Centre in every country and an International Executive Committee with elected representatives from different countries of the world Guest Lecturer – UCL Arts, the University of California Los Angeles School of Arts, Department of World Arts and Cultures, as a part of the Make Art/Stop AIDS lecture series 'Puppetry in Activism' Also at Fowler Museum of World Arts and Cultures at UCLA.

== Other activities based on theatre ==
Festival Co-ordinator for Putul Yatra Mumbai-2005 National Puppet Theatre Festival organized by Sangeet Natak Akademi, New Delhi. This was a national festival organized to coincide with the World Puppet Day by the Government body of the Sangeet Natak Akademi. Jurist at the Prix Danube, Bratislava Slovak Republic– International Youth and Children's Film Festival. September 2003 – she was a jurist at the International Film Festival for Youth and Children in Bratislava the capital of the Slovak Republic. A seven-day event featuring 80 films from over 30 countries, in the categories of animation, documentary, fiction and magazine.
