= Chinta Ravi Bala Krishna =

Indian dancer

Chinta Ravi Bala Krishna is a winner of a number of awards.

== Awards ==
- The Sangeet Natak Akademi’s Ustad Bismillah Khan Yuva Puraskar award for 2009
- A recipient of the singular honor of Yuva Sutradhari at the Siddhendra Yogi Nrityotsav in 2007
- A Gold Medallist M.A Kuchipudi

In addition, Krishna is the winner of other awards.
