= Parshwanath Upadhye =

Indian classical dancer and teacher (born 1982)

Parshwanath S. Upadhye
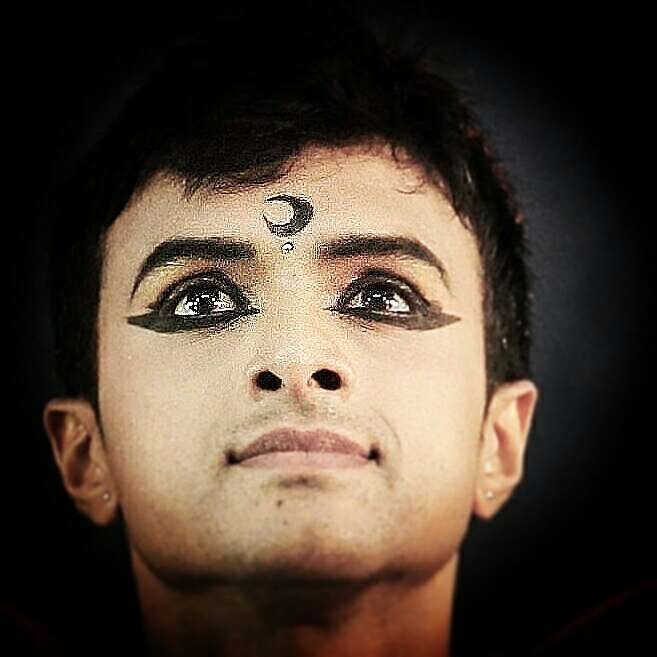
- Born: Parshwanath Shantinath Upadhye; 26 March 1982; Belgaum, Karnataka, India
- Occupation: Dancer
- Years active: 1996-present
- Career
- Dances: Bharatanatyam
- Website: www.parshwanathupadhye.com

Parshwanath Upadhye (born 26 March 1982) is an Indian classical dancer, choreographer, and teacher. He is trained in the traditional Mysore style of Bharatanatyam.

Along with his wife Shruti Gopal, Parshwanath choreographs, directs, produces, and presents his work at national and international venues under the banner of the Upadhye School of Dance and Punyah Dance Company, Bangalore, India.

== Education and training ==
Parshwanath Upadhye has studied for 15 years in the traditional Mysore style of Bharathanatyam under the guidance of Guru Shri Ravindra Sharma of Belgaum. He completed his Arangetram in the year 1996.

He continued his sadhana with the Guru at Ravind Natya Niketa, Belgaum, till the year 2002. He completed his Visharad in Bharatnatyam from Akhil Bharatiya Gandharva Mahavidyalaya Mandal in 1993-94 followed by Alankaara in Bharatnatyam from the same university in the years 2000-2003. He also excelled in the Vidwath Examination in Bharatnatyam conducted by the Karnataka Secondary Education Board, Bangalore.

In 1996 he participated in the 'Karanas' workshop conducted by the eminent dancer Guru Dr. Padma Subramanyam at Mangalore. He also had the opportunity to explore folk music and dance in the festivals conducted by Bailhongal Janapada Sangha, Karnataka, in 1994-96.

Since 2002 Parshwanath Upadhye has learned from the dancer duo Shri Kiran Subramanyam and Smt. Sandhya Kiran at ‘Rasika Academy of Performing Arts,’ Bangalore. Now he continues to learn and explore the art form under Padmashri Prof. Sudharani Raghupathy.

== Performances and Presentations ==
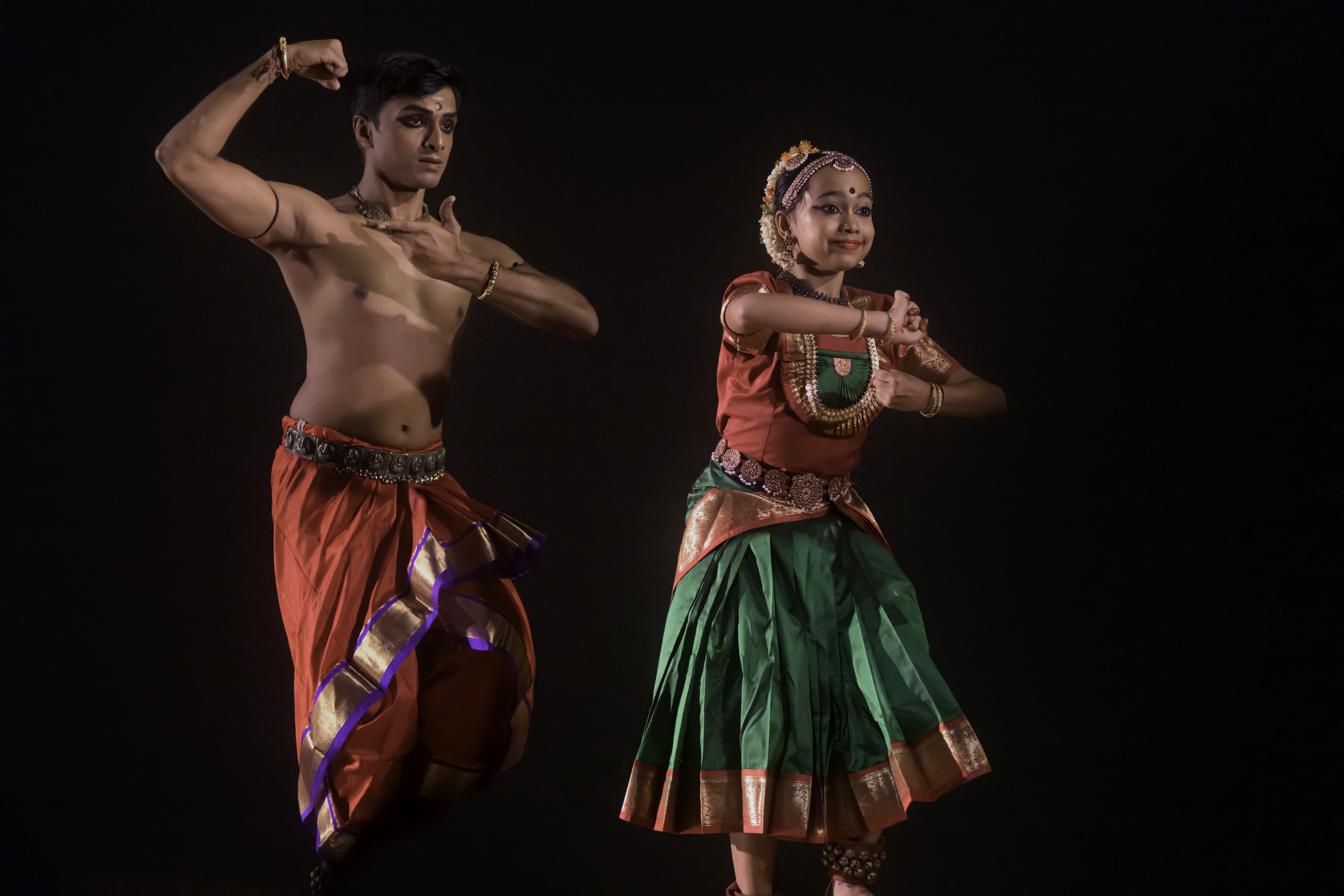
Parshwanath Upadhye performing Suta in ADA Ranga Mandira

Since 1996, Parshwanath Upadhye has danced and participated in numerous festivals and stages in India and abroad.

From 2012 on, he has been choreographing, directing, producing, and presenting under the Punyah Dance Company, Bangalore. Among the works presented at national and international venues are Hara, Sat-gati, Paartha, Punyah Krishna and Abha.

== Critical reception ==
"There are many perfect performers; but very few who can create magic and still less who dance like the gods. Parshwanath Upadhye belongs to the latter class. He has an electrifying persona and stage presence and there is a vein of spirituality that runs through his dance whatever be the content."

-Ranee Kumar, The Hindu

"Upadhye’s interpretation of a devotee’s adoration of Shiva, more specifically at the famous Chidambaram temple, was a sight to behold. His performance was both athletic and graceful. His high kicks, leaps and knee turns did not come at the cost of nuances such as beautifully articulated mudras or clarity of movement in his adavus (basic bharatanatyam dance steps). To top it all off, he kept up the intensity of the dance until the very end, building a sense of crescendo. There were quite a few audible sighs in the audience, who were clearly moved when the devotee was granted audience by Lord Shiva."

-Aparita Bhandari, The Dance Current, Canada's Dance Magazine

"We know Parshwanath Upadhye as a Bharatanatyam soloist from Bangalore[...]. What we were not aware of is that he is a choreographer, and a brilliant one at that. At Kartik Fine Arts, ‘Hara,’ by Parshwanath’s Punyah Dance Company, was a stunning 55-minute production that combined precision in dance movements, perfect timing, layered music, deft visualisation and effective lighting."

- Rupa Srikanth, The Hindu

"For a dancer with a keen sense of rhythm like Parshwanath Upadhye, there is almost no equal in the field. He is the uncrowned prince of the Bharatanatyam scene today and his Facebook page has more followers than those of some minor Bollywood stars"

-Veejay Sai, culture critic

"Parshwanath Upadhye was remarkable both for his striking combination of tandava energy with gentle lasya grace. His dancing demonstrated high technical virtuosity in movement along with a fluidity, precision, and beautiful expression."

-Dr. Ketu H Katrak, Professor of Drama, University of California, Irvine

"Parshwanath's choreography lacks dramatic arc. His face is not emotive and he masks this cleverly with great physicality. Beautifully executed with interesting exits and entrances, the music is typically BENGALURU LITE - a soft-light music-wafting of Carnatic ragas. Against this, the trio's nonstop movement seemed to be a tad too monotonous. The precision, dynamic partnering and team work were admirable. However, after 50 minutes of this endless movement, I longed for some quiet and measured stillness..

-Dr Anita Ratnam, Jan 1, 2019, Anita says...,

"Parshwanath Upadhye needs to bring more gravitas into his Bharatanatyam abhinaya, than the present superficial mime narratives that seem to be his choice. More like theatre, he keeps spinning narratives which lack in-depth treatment, as seen in Baro Krishnaiyyaa and the other composition devoted to Goddess Chamudeswari, where the over spun Kalidasa episode became more like a digression. The starting Hamsadhwani invocation from the Mysore Bharatanatyam repertoire and the Balamurali Krishna Gati Bhed Priya Tillana in Adi talam showed the dancer’s grasp over nritta. With his Yoga expertise, Upadhye moves with ease.

- Leela Venkataraman, Renowned Dance Critic"

The above review appeared in the article"Dance practitioners churn out issues through deliberations". The Asian Age. India: The Asian Age. 15 November 2018.

"While the theme was good, several aspects of the presentation required thinking. The whole piece was relying heavily on the Sanskrit text and less on dance. The actual dance sequences were far and few. Cluttering too many episodes with a text heavy performance also seemed to slow down the energy of the presentation.

- Veejay Sai, culture critic, Nov 6, 2017, Celebrating the Nartak"

== Awards and accolades ==
Parshwanath Upadhye has received several national awards, including the Sangeet Natak Akademi’s Yuva Puraskar award in 2017. He is also an empanelled artist of the ICCR (Indian Council for Cultural Relations).

=== List of awards ===
1. Natya Mayura Award by Gangubai Hangal Trust, Karnataka

2. Arsha Kala Choodamani by Swami Dayananda Saraswati, New Jersey, USA

3. Uttam Kalakaar by Mahamastakaabhisheka Committee, Shravanabelgola
4. Nritya Nipuna by Belli Gajje, Bangalore
5. Arihant Puraskar by Jain Parishat, Kolkata
6. Jain Rashtragaurav by Jain Parishat, Karnataka
7. Natya Keerthi by Aru Shri art centre, Colombo, Sri Lanka
8. CCRT Scholarships for pursuing studies in Bharatnatyam by Ministry of Human Resources Development, Govt. of India
9. Natya Prabha award by The Sabha Kuwait 2016
10. Ustad Bismillah Khan Yuva Puraskar 2017 by Sangeet Natak Akademi, New Delhi
11. Awarded as the best performer of the year 2017 by Music Academy, Chennai

12. "Kala Kiran puraskar" by Adithya Birla foundation Mumbai 2018

13."Rasika Hridaya Chora" by Sridevi Natyalaya Chennai 2018

== Teaching ==
Parshwanath Upadhye started teaching Bharatanatyam in 1996 when he established the Sharada Sangeetha Nrithya Academy, Belgaum, of which he was also the Director till the year 2000.

In 2010 he established the Upadhye School of Dance in Bangalore of which he is the Ddrector, Cchief choreographer,and Pprformer.
