= Khol =

Indian terracotta two-sided drum

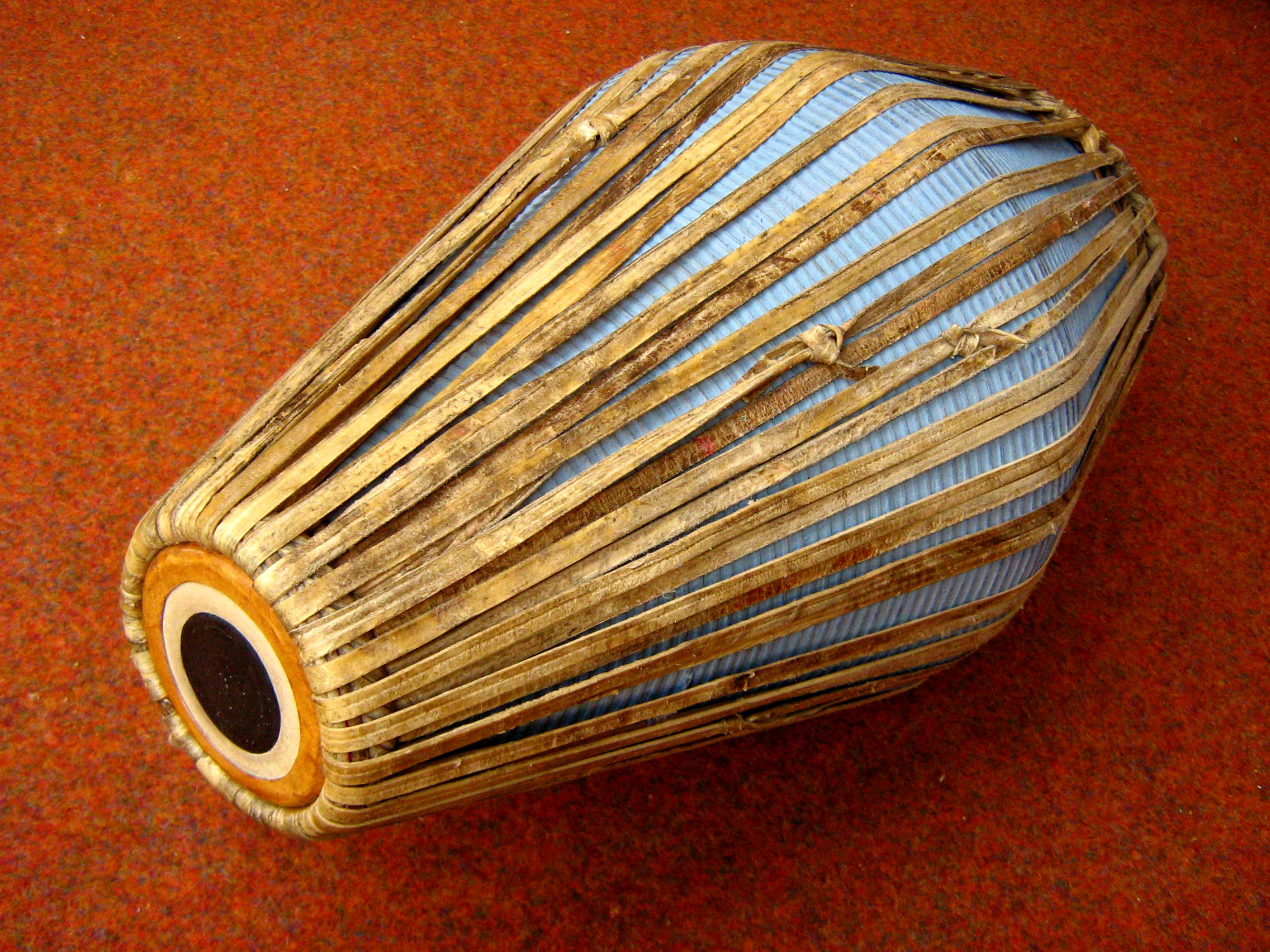
- Mridanga bayan, or khol

Percussion
- Other names: Mridanga
- Classification: Membranophones

Related instruments
- Tabla, Dholak

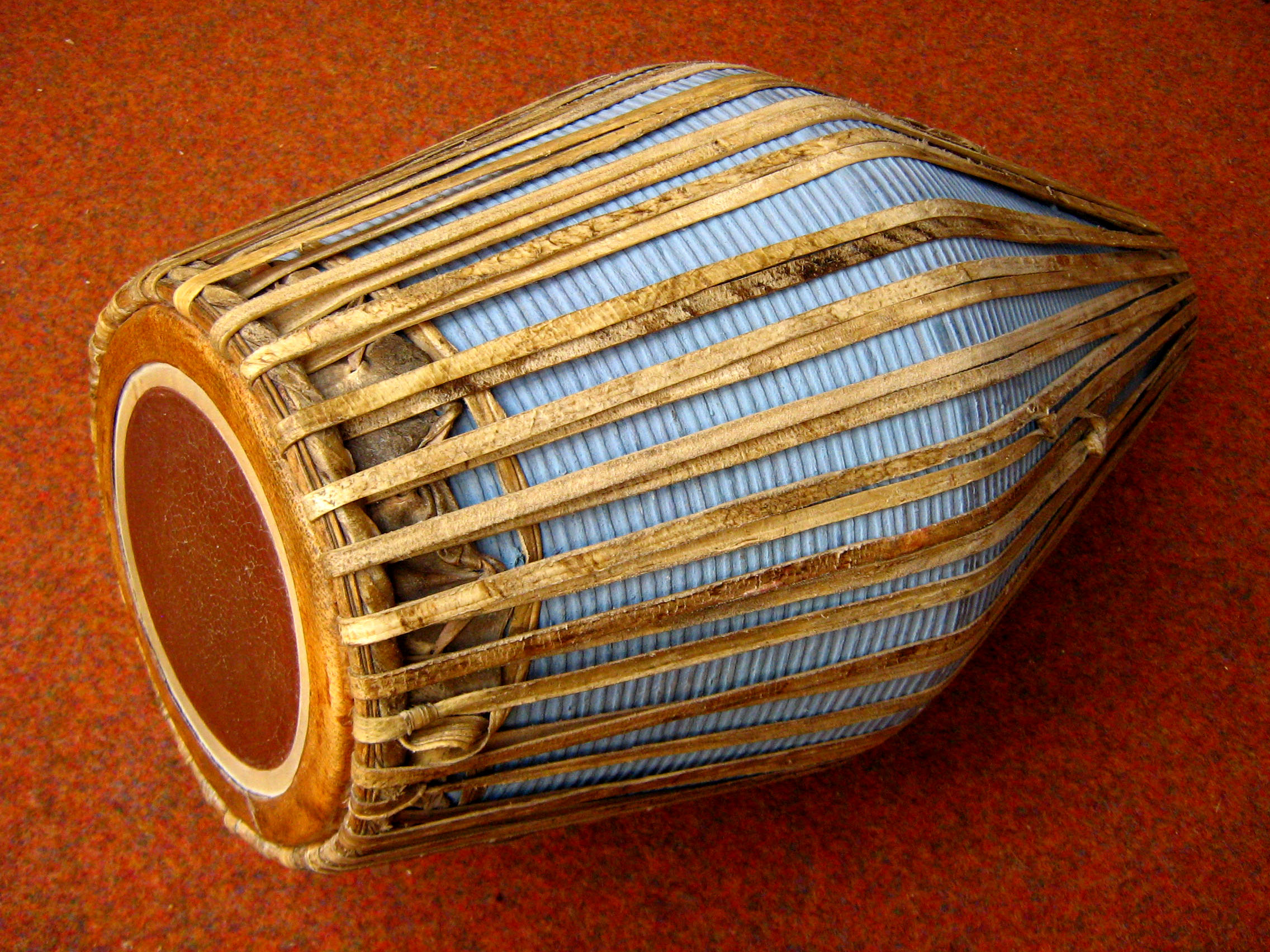

The khol is a terracotta two-sided drum used in northern and eastern India for accompaniment with devotional music (bhakti). It is also known as a mridanga (< Sanskrit mṛd + aṅga, lit. 'clay limb'), not to be confused with mridangam. It originates from the Indian states of Odisha, West Bengal, Assam and Manipur. The drum is played with palms and fingers of both hands.

== Description ==
The khol is regarded as resembling to the ancient gopuchha shape of drums, as described in Natya Shastra. The right face of the drum has a high pitch and produces a metallic sound, whereas the left face, produces a lower bass sound. The larger side can be tuned with humidity. On a humid day the larger side will loosen up and vibrate more producing the lower sound. During a dry day the side tightens up producing a high pitched sound. Players of the instrument will add water to their drum if they feel it does not produce a low enough sound. They will put a bit of water on their finger and spread it around the edge of the large side. They will either let it sit there for a few minutes, or manually stretch it with their palm.

== Construction ==
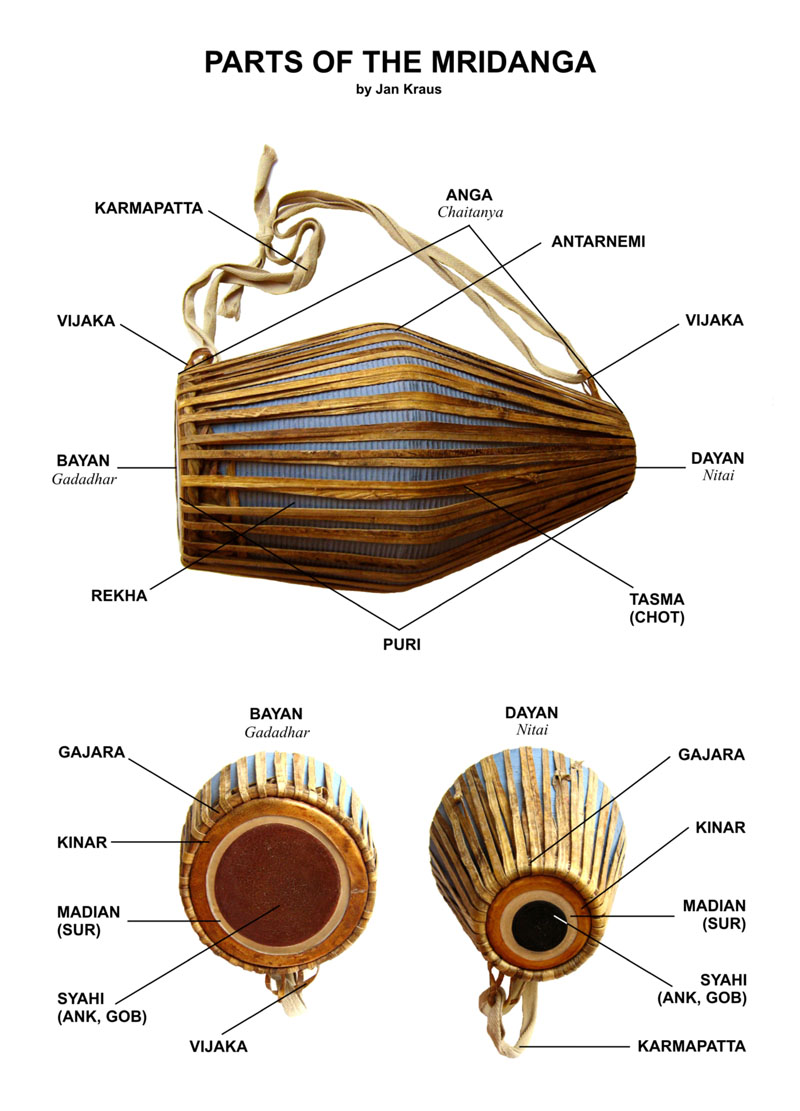
Parts of the khol (mridanga)

The khol is a drum with a hollow earthen body, with drumheads at both ends, one far smaller than the other. The drumheads are made of cow or goat skin, and are three-layered and treated with a circle of rice paste, glue, and iron known as syahi. Some modern instruments are made with a fibreglass body and synthetic drumheads.

== History ==
There are so many histories about its origin. Different types of Khol are available in north eastern India. Odisha, Manipur, Bengal and Assamese Khol are commonly found in different forms. The wooden khol was made into terracotta by the Assamese polymath Sankardev.

== Use ==
The khol is considered an integral part of the Ek Saran Naam Dharma culture and is used in bhaona (plays), gayan-bayan, prasanga-kirtan and borgeets (lyrical songs) in Assam. Assamese polymath Sankardeva is known to have adapted and evolved the tradition of gayan-bayan by using musical instruments like the khol and taal. According to Assamese Neo-Vaishnavites, playing the khol is regarded as a holy activity and it is also considered to be one of the most important traditional percussion instruments. It is also a key musical instrument that accompanies a Sattriya performance.

The instrument is used in every Vishnu (Jagannath, Radha Krishna) temple in Odisha during arati rituals. The drum is used to accompany Odia, Bengali kirtans by medieval poets like Chandidas, Govindadasa and Gyanadas. It is also used to accompany Gaudiya Nritya, one of the nine Indian classical dances (as recognized by Ministry of Culture, and not recognized by Sangeet Natak Akademi).

In the International Society for Krishna Consciousness (ISKCON, "Hare Krishnas") and in Gaudiya Vaishnava societies, the khol is the primary drum for bhajan and kirtan.

== See also ==
- Mridangam
- Tabla
- Thavil
- Karatalas
- Maddale, an instrument used in Yakshagana
- Dholak
- Manoj Kumar Das
- Samphor
- Taphon
