= List of villages in Ramgarh district =

Ramgarh district is one of the 24 districts of Jharkhand state, India. This is the list of villages of Ramgarh district according to respective 6 blocks.

== Chitarpur ==
List of villages in Chitarpur block
Sl.	Name of panchayats	Name of villages
1	Barkipona	Barkipona
1	Barkipona	Janhe
1	Barkipona	Dudgi
1	Barkipona	Muruniya
2	Bhuchungdih	Kumhradhara
2	Bhuchungdih	Koihara
2	Bhuchungdih	Lerhitungri
2	Bhuchungdih	Janiamara
2	Bhuchungdih	Gaurabera
2	Bhuchungdih	Bhuchungdih
2	Bhuchungdih	Hutugdag
2	Bhuchungdih	Sandi
3	Borobing	Borobing
3	Borobing	Chhotkipona
3	Borobing	Murubanda
4	Chitarpur East	Chitarpur
5	Chitarpur North	Chitarpur
6	Chitarpur South	Chitarpur
7	Chitarpur West	Chitarpur
8	Larikalan	Larikalan
8	Larikalan	Chhotki Lari
9	Marang Marcha	Tebardag
9	Marang Marcha	Sondh
9	Marang Marcha	Marang Marcha
10	Mayal	Mayal
11	Sewai North	Sewai
12	Sewai South	Sewai
13	Sukrigarha	Sukrigarha

== Dulmi ==
List of villages in Dulmi block
Sl.	Name of panchayats	Name of villages
1	Dulmi	Bhaypur
1	Dulmi	Idpara
1	Dulmi	Dulmi
1	Dulmi	Chamrom
2	Honhe	Honhe
2	Honhe	Bonga Sauri
3	Ichatu	Ichatu
3	Ichatu	Kitma
3	Ichatu	Jamsingh
3	Ichatu	Chatak
4	Jamira	Jario
4	Jamira	Bahatu
4	Jamira	Jamira
5	Kulhi	Biyang
5	Kulhi	Kulhi
5	Kulhi	Urwa
5	Kulhi	Karo
6	Patamdaga	Harhad Kander
6	Patamdaga	Bongai
6	Patamdaga	Pancha
6	Patamdaga	Bagrai
6	Patamdaga	Patamdaga
7	Sikni	Sikni
7	Sikni	Hohad
8	Siru	Priyatu
8	Siru	Siru
8	Siru	Madgi
8	Siru	Bhalu
9	Soso	Dhuthuwa
9	Soso	Fanikpur
9	Soso	Ukrid
9	Soso	Soso
9	Soso	Kusumbha
10	Usra	Godatu
10	Usra	Dantu
10	Usra	Korchey
10	Usra	Lawalong
10	Usra	Usra

== Gola ==
List of villages in Gola block
Sl.	Name of panchayats	Name of villages
1	Banda	Murpa
1	Banda	Murmuta
1	Banda	Banda
2	Bariatu	Kamta
2	Bariatu	Barkikoiya
2	Bariatu	Kamti
2	Bariatu	Sitingatu
2	Bariatu	Bardiha
2	Bariatu	Chhotkikoiya
2	Bariatu	Rundai
2	Bariatu	Sotai
2	Bariatu	Nawadih
2	Bariatu	Bariatu
2	Bariatu	Alagdiha
3	Barlanga	Barlanga
3	Barlanga	Hethbarga
4	Betulkala	Betulkala
4	Betulkala	Betulkhurd
4	Betulkala	Patratu
4	Betulkala	Tandil
4	Betulkala	Bisa
5	Chadi	Jobhiya
5	Chadi	Chadi
5	Chadi	Ghansikenke
5	Chadi	Kusumdih
5	Chadi	Heramdaga
5	Chadi	Haribandh
6	Bariatu	Chokad
6	Bariatu	Chakarwali
6	Bariatu	Chopadaru
6	Bariatu	Khakhra
6	Bariatu	Dundigachhi
7	Goal	Gola
8	Hesapoda	Hesapoda
8	Hesapoda	Bhubhai
8	Hesapoda	Korambe
9	Huppu	Byang
9	Huppu	Khokha
9	Huppu	Nawasirka
9	Huppu	Purnasirka
9	Huppu	Toyar
9	Huppu	Huppu
9	Huppu	Kenke
10	Korambe	Korambe
10	Korambe	Konardih
10	Korambe	Hesal
10	Korambe	Ghaghra
11	Kumhardaga	Jamuna
11	Kumhardaga	Bantara
11	Kumhardaga	Dabhatu
11	Kumhardaga	Kumhardaga
11	Kumhardaga	Tirla
12	Maganpur	Jangi
12	Maganpur	Maganpur
12	Maganpur	Mahlidih
13	Nawadih	Govindpur
13	Nawadih	Nawadih
13	Nawadih	Sondimra
14	Purabdih	Raipura
14	Purabdih	Baghakudar
14	Purabdih	Bargutu
14	Purabdih	Purabdih
15	Rakua	Gandhoniya
15	Rakua	Lipya
15	Rakua	Rakua
16	Sadam	Tonagatu
16	Sadam	Serengatu
16	Sadam	Sadam
16	Sadam	Homasita
16	Sadam	Kujukalan
17	Sangrampur	Sarlakhurd
17	Sangrampur	Murudih
17	Sangrampur	Sangrampur
17	Sangrampur	Hullu
17	Sangrampur	Barkisarla
18	Saragdih	Sokla
18	Saragdih	Dimra
18	Saragdih	Uladaka
18	Saragdih	Saragdih
19	Sosokalan	Hematpur
19	Sosokalan	Hisimdag
19	Sosokalan	Dhamnatand
19	Sosokalan	Sosokhurd
19	Sosokalan	Sosokalan
20	Sutri	Rola
20	Sutri	Sutri
20	Sutri	Bhuiyasangtu
20	Sutri	Babhansangtu
21	Uparbarga	Aoradih
21	Uparbarga	Raorao
21	Uparbarga	Uparbarga

== Mandu ==
List of villages in Mandu block
Sl.	Name of panchayats	Name of villages
1	Ara North	Ara North
2	Ara South	Ara South
3	Badgaon	Badgaon
3	Badgaon	Madaura
3	Badgaon	Kumharbar
3	Badgaon	Bargaon
3	Badgaon	Bhuiyadih
4	Barka Chumba	Barka Chumba
5	Barughutu East	Barughutu East
6	Barughutu Middle	Barughutu
7	Barughutu North	Parej
7	Barughutu North	Banji
8	Barughutu West	Barughutu West
9	Basantpur	Kutse
9	Basantpur	Basantpur
9	Basantpur	Pachanda
9	Basantpur	Durukasmar
10	Bumri	Bumri
10	Bumri	Chapri
10	Bumri	Kanjgi
11	Chhotidundi	Chhotkidundi
11	Chhotidundi	Barkidundi
12	Hesagarha	Hesagarha
12	Hesagarha	Kasikhap
12	Hesagarha	Keribanda
12	Hesagarha	Toyra
13	Ichakdih	Ichakdih
14	Karma North	Harwe
14	Karma North	Karma
15	Karma South	Burhakhap
15	Karma South	Karma
15	Karma South	Sugia
16	Kedla Middle	Kedla Middle
17	Kedla North	Kedla North
18	Kedla South	Duni
18	Kedla South	Garkia Alias Parsabera
19	Kimo	Ambadih
19	Kimo	Chapra
19	Kimo	Tutki
19	Kimo	Karidih
19	Kimo	Kimo
19	Kimo	Choy
19	Kimo	Banda
19	Kimo	Udlu
19	Kimo	Sesamo
19	Kimo	Edla
19	Kimo	Harli
19	Kimo	Kotre
20	Kuju East	Pokharia
20	Kuju East	Murpa
21	Kuju South	Kuju South
22	Kuju West	Kuju West
23	Laiyo North	Laiyo
24	Laiyo South	Laiyo
25	Manduchati	Gargali
25	Manduchati	Gobindpur
25	Manduchati	Kekobasaudi
25	Manduchati	Mandu
26	Mandudih	Semra
26	Mandudih	Mandu
27	Manjhla Chumba	Manjhla Chumba
27	Manjhla Chumba	Chhotka Chumba
28	Nawadih	Nawadih
28	Nawadih	Chainpur
29	Orla	Datma
29	Orla	Jobla
29	Orla	Orla
30	Pindra	Barisam
30	Pindra	Rauta
30	Pindra	Ulhara
30	Pindra	Pindra
31		Pundi
31		Bongahara
32	Ratwe	Ratwe
33	Sarubera	Sarubera
33	Sarubera	Sirka
33	Sarubera	Atna
34	Sondiha	Barbanda
34	Sondiha	Bhadwa
34	Sondiha	Sondiha
34	Taping	Taping
35	Topa	Banwar
35	Topa	Topa

== Patratu ==
List of villages in Patratu block
Sl.	Name of panchayats	Name of villages
1	AK Koliyari	AK Koliyari
2	Balkudra	Balkudra
3	Baridih	Lowadih
3	Baridih	Jobo
3	Baridih	Baridih
3	Baridih	Dadidag
3	Baridih	Kadru
4	Bhurkunda	Bhurkunda
5	Bicha	Lem
5	Bicha	Bicha
5	Bicha	Sutharpur
5	Bicha	Salgo
6	Budhbazar Chief House	Budhbazar Chief House
7	Budhbazar Dotalla	Budhbazar Dotalla
8	Budhbazar Imligach	Budhbazar Imligach
9	CCL Saunda	CCL Saunda
10	Central Saunda	Central Saunda
11	Chikor	Chikor
11	Chikor	Ladi
12	Chordhara	Dunduwa
12	Chordhara	Chordhara
13	Dewariya Basti	Dewariya Basti
14	Dudgi	Hehal
14	Dudgi	Dudgi
15	Hafua	Kurbij
15	Hafua	Hafua
15	Hafua	Batuka
15	Hafua	Ichpiri
15	Hafua	Osam
16	Hanumangarhi	Hanumangarhi
17	Hariharpur	Netua
17	Hariharpur	Barghutwa
17	Hariharpur	Melani
17	Hariharpur	Chetma
17	Hariharpur	Hariharpur
18	Hesla	Hesla
19	Jawaharnagar	Jawaharnagar
20	Jainagar	Jainagar
21	Kander	Chhotki Shidhwar
21	Kander	Kander
21	Kander	Siur
21	Kander	Sidhwarkala
21	Kander	Kachchudag
22	Katiya Panchmandir	Katiya Panchmandir
23	Katiya Basti	Katiya Basti
24	Koto	Koto
24	Koto	Dadidih
24	Koto	Shahitand
25	Kurse	Kusiyara
25	Kurse	Bhandra
25	Kurse	Koto Khurd
25	Kurse	Kurse
25	Kurse	Ghaghra
26	Labga	Rasda
26	Labga	Gegda
26	Labga	Labga
26	Labga	Aarashah
26	Labga	Jarad
26	Labga	Kinni
27	Lapanga	Lapanga
28	Pali	Oriyatu
28	Pali	Nimmi
28	Pali	Sudi
28	Pali	Pali
29	Palu	Tokisud
29	Palu	Kirigarha
29	Palu	Terpa
29	Palu	Rochap
29	Palu	Palu
29	Palu	Ukrid
30	Patelnagar	Patelnagar
31	Patratu	Patratu
32	Piri	Masmohna
32	Piri	Piri
33	Sanki	Kodi
33	Sanki	Armadag
33	Sanki	Sanki
33	Sanki	Jumra
33	Sanki	Chito
34	Sankul	Sankul
35	Saunda Basti	Saunda Basti
36	Saundadih	Saundadih
37	Sayal KK Koliyari	Sayal KK Koliyari
38	Sayal North	Sayal North
39	Sayal South	Sayal South
40	Shah Colony	Shah Colony
41	Sundarnagar	Sundarnagar
42	Talatand	Palni
42	Talatand	Talatand
42	Talatand	Uchringa
42	Talatand	Soliya
42	Talatand	Bartua

== Ramgarh ==
List of villages in Ramgarh block
Sl.	Name of panchayats	Name of villages
1	Barlong	Barlong
1	Barlong	Kundru
1	Barlong	Khurd
2	Dohakatu	Bankheta
2	Dohakatu	Burha Khukra
2	Dohakatu	Gandke
2	Dohakatu	Dohakatu
2	Dohakatu	Lolo
3	Kundrukala	Lodhma
3	Kundrukala	Kundrukala
3	Kundrukala	Saraiya

== See also ==
- Lists of villages in Jharkhand
