= Barughutu =

- Census Town
- Location in Jharkhand, India Barughutu (India)
- Coordinates: 23.7875°N 85.5525°E
- Country: India
- State: Jharkhand
- District: Ramgarh

Population (2011)
  - Total: 24,202

Languages (*For language details see Mandu (community development block)#Language and religion)
  - Official: Hindi, Urdu
- Time zone: UTC+5:30 (IST)
- PIN: 825316
- Telephone/ STD code: 06545
- Vehicle registration: JH
- Lok Sabha constituency: Hazaribagh
- Vidhan Sabha constituency: Mandu
- Website: ramgarh.nic.in

Barughutu is a census town in the Mandu CD block in the Ramgarh subdivision of the Ramgarh district in the state of Jharkhand, India. Barughutu is adjacent to Ghatotand, where Tata Steel's West Bokaro Colliery is situated.

== Geography ==
Cities, towns and locations in Ramgarh district in North Chotanagpur Division
M: municipality, CT: census town, R: rural/ urban centre, T: tourist centre, P: power plant
Abbreviation used- TPP: thermal power project
Owing to space constraints in the small map, the actual locations in a larger map may vary slightly

=== Location ===
Barughutu is located at 23.7875°N 85.5525°E.

=== Area overview ===
Barughutu, Ramgarh has an active coal-mining sector. The map provides links to five operational areas of Central Coalfields spread across South Karanpura Coalfield, Ramgarh Coalfield and West Bokaro Coalfield. Four of the six CD blocks in the district have coal mines – Patratu, Ramgarh, Mandu and Chitarpur. The concentration of census towns in these blocks is greater than the concentration of rural blocks. Only blocks, Gola and Dulmi, are totally rural areas. Ramgarh district lies in the central part of the Chota Nagpur Plateau. The Damodar valley covers most of the district. The forested areas in highlands to the north and the south of the valley can be seen in the map (mark the shaded areas). "Chotanagpur has a charm of its own… The entire area forms one of the most charming series of views imaginable. The far-off hills in the background in exquisite tints of blue or purple as the light falls, the nearer hills picturesquely shaped and luxuriant in every shade of green with their bold escarpments in black or grey, and the brown plains below furnishing their quota of colours."

Note: The map alongside presents some of the notable locations in the district. All places marked in the map are linked in the larger full screen map.

== Demographics ==
According to the 2011 Census of India, Barughutu had a total population of 24,202, of which 12,864 (53%) were males and 11,338 (47%) were females. Population in the age range 0–6 years was 2,720. The total number of literate persons in Barughutu was 18,166 (84.56% of the population over 6 years).

As of 2001 India census, Barughutu had a population of 21,091. Males constitute 54% of the population and females 46%. Barughutu has an average literacy rate of 70%, higher than the national average of 59.5%; with 59% of the males and 41% of females literate. 16% of the population is under 6 years of age.

== Infrastructure ==
According to the District Census Handbook 2011, Ramgarh, Barughutu covered an area of 6.719 km^{2}. Among the civic amenities, it had 60 km roads with both open and closed drains, the protected water supply involved tap water from treated and untreated sources, overhead tank. It had 4,612 domestic electric connections, 300 road lighting points. Among the medical facilities, it had 3 hospitals, 1 dispensary, 1 health centre, 1 family welfare centre, 20 maternity and child welfare centres, 20 maternity homes, 1 nursing home, 10 medicine shops. Among the educational facilities it had 3 primary schools, 2 middle schools, 1 secondary school, 1 senior secondary school, the nearest general degree college at Mandu 10 km away. Among the social, recreational and cultural facilities it had 2 stadiums, 4 auditorium/ community halls. One important commodity it produced was coal. It had the branch offices of 1 nationalised bank, 1 agricultural credit society, 2 non-agricultural credit societies.

== Education ==
Tata DAV Public School is located at Barughutu.
