= Chitarpur =

- Census Town
- Location in Jharkhand, India Chitarpur (India)
- Coordinates: 23.5794°N 85.6548°E
- Country: India
- State: Jharkhand
- District: Ramgarh

Area
  - Total: 6.9372 km^{2} (2.6785 sq mi)
- Elevation: 364 m (1,194 ft)

Population (2011)
  - Total: 22,837
  - Density: 3,292.0/km^{2} (8,526.1/sq mi)

Languages (*For language details see Chitarpur (community development block)#Language and religion)
  - Official: Hindi, Urdu
- Time zone: UTC+5:30 (IST)
- PIN: 825101
- Telephone/ STD code: 06553
- Vehicle registration: JH
- Lok Sabha constituency: Hazaribagh
- Vidhan Sabha constituency: Ramgarh
- Website: ramgarh.nic.in

Chitarpur (also written as Chitar Pur) is a census town in the Chitarpur CD block in the Ramgarh subdivision of the Ramgarh district in the Indian state of Jharkhand.

== Etymology ==
The word Chitarpur is derived from Era-1700 Ruling Maharaja's daughter Chitra Devi. As the village and Nearby Areas were given to her by his father.

== Geography ==
Cities, towns and locations in Ramgarh district in North Chotanagpur Division
M: municipality, CT: census town, R: rural/ urban centre, T: tourist centre, P: power plant
Abbreviation used- TPP: thermal power project
Owing to space constraints in the small map, the actual locations in a larger map may vary slightly

=== Location ===
Chitarpur is located at 23.5749°N 85.6548°E. It has an average elevation of 364 metres (1167 feet).

=== Area overview ===
Ramgarh has a vibrant coal-mining sector. The map alongside provides links to five operational areas of Central Coalfields spread across South Karanpura Coalfield, Ramgarh Coalfield and West Bokaro Coalfield. Four of the six CD blocks in the district have coal mines – Patratu, Ramgarh, Mandu and Chitarpur. The high concentration of census towns in these blocks are noticeable on the map. Only two blocks, Gola and Dulmi, are totally rural areas. Ramgarh district lies in the central part of the Chota Nagpur Plateau. The Damodar valley covers most of the district. The forested areas in highlands to the north and the south of the valley can be seen in the map (mark the shaded areas). "Chotanagpur has a charm of its own… The entire area forms one of the most charming series of views imaginable. The far-off hills in the background in exquisite tints of blue or purple as the light falls, the nearer hills picturesquely shaped and luxuriant in every shade of green with their bold escarpments in black or grey, and the brown plains below furnishing their quota of colours."

Note: The map alongside presents some of the notable locations in the district. All places marked in the map are linked in the larger full screen map.

== Demographics ==
According to the 2011 Census of India, Chitar Pur had a total population of 22,837, of which 11,993 (53%) were males and 10,844 (47%) were females. Population in the age range 0-6 years was 3,578. The total number of literate persons in Chitar Pur was 15,652 (81.27% of the population over 6 years).

== Civic administration ==
=== CD block HQ ===
The headquarters of Chitarpur CD block is located at Chitarpur town.

== Infrastructure ==
According to the District Census Handbook 2011, Ramgarh, Chitarpur covered an area of 6.9372 km^{2}. Among the civic amenities, it had 5 km roads with both open and closed drains, the protected water supply involved tapwater from treated sources, uncovered well, overhead tank. It had 3,330 domestic electric connections. Among the medical facilities, it had 1 hospital, 1 dispensary, 1 health centre, 6 family welfare centres, 6 maternity and child welfare centres, 4 maternity homes, 6 nursing homes, 2 medicine shops. Among the educational facilities it had 3 primary schools, 2 middle schools, 1 secondary school, 1 senior secondary school, the nearest general degree college at Gola 5 km away. Two important commodities it produced were steel box and steel almirah. It had the branch office of 1 nationalised bank.

== Economy ==
Rajrappa open cast mine and Rajrappa washery are operational under Rajrappa Area of Central Coalfields Limited.

== Transport ==
- Badki Pona Railway Station: the only railway station in the Village. Zone: SE RAILWAY/RANCHI.
- Roads: NH-23 Road is the major means of transportation in the Village. Central Government of Highways Authority has planned to change it into a four-lane road which connects to NH-33 towards its east and NH-2 on the west.
- Birsa Munda Airport: the nearest airport is located 51 kilometres (32 mi) away in Ranchi. Direct flights are available to Delhi, Patna, Mumbai, Bangalore and Kolkata.
- Bus services: operate from Ranchi to Kolkata, via Chitarpur.

== Places of interest ==
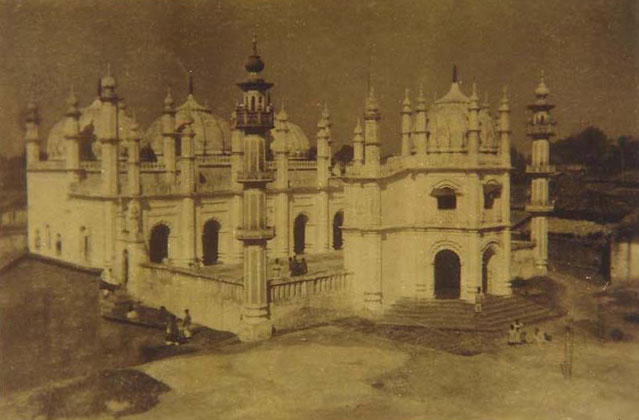
Jama Masjid in 1980s

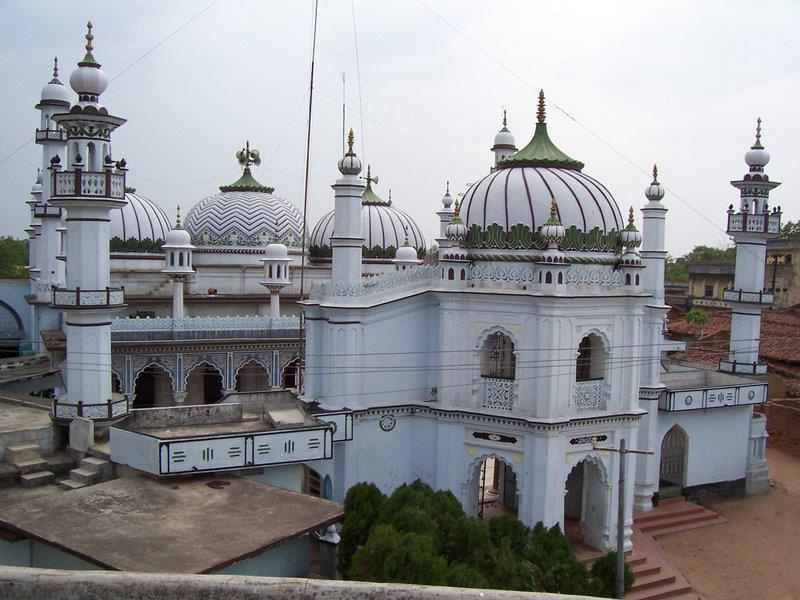
Jama Masjid in 2009

Historical architecture

- Chitarpur Jama Masjid: situated in the heart of Chitarpur Village. This mosque was built in 1670 and contains magnificent Mughal architecture.
- Chaitarpur shivalaya mandir: situated in Shivalaya Road, Chitarpur.
- Rajrappa Temple: situated 10 kilometres (6.2 mi) from Chitarpur.

== Education ==
Chitarpur Village has a number of private and government schools and colleges:

- Chitarpur High School: built in 1950.
- Chitarpur Girls Urdu High School (Banat): established in c. 1980.
- D.A.V Public School C.C.L: the only C.B.S.E English Medium school in the area.
- Chitarpur Inter College: established in 1982.
- Government Engineering College Ramgarh: Is the only technical institute situated in the area and has been recently inaugurated and affiliated by AICTE. Run and managed by Techno India Group.
