= Ghatotand =

- Town
- Location in Jharkhand, India Ghatotand (India)
- Coordinates: 23.7975°N 85.5745°E
- Country: India
- State: Jharkhand
- District: Ramgarh

Languages (*For language details see Mandu (community development block)#Language and religion)
  - Official: Hindi, Urdu
- Time zone: UTC+5:30 (IST)
- PIN: 825316
- Telephone/ STD code: 06545
- Vehicle registration: JH
- Lok Sabha constituency: Hazaribagh
- Vidhan Sabha constituency: Mandu
- Website: ramgarh.nic.in

Ghatotand is a town in the Mandu CD block in the Ramgarh subdivision of the Ramgarh district in the state of Jharkhand, India. The West Bokaro Division of Tata Steel is located here.

== Geography ==
Cities, towns and locations in Ramgarh district in North Chotanagpur Division
M: municipality, CT: census town, R: rural/ urban centre, T: tourist centre, P: power plant
Abbreviation used- TPP: thermal power project
Owing to space constraints in the small map, the actual locations in a larger map may vary slightly

=== Location ===
Ghatotand is located at 23.7975°N 85.5745°E.

=== Area overview ===
Ramgarh has a prominent coal-mining sector. The map alongside provides links to five operational areas of Central Coalfields spread across South Karanpura Coalfield, Ramgarh Coalfield and West Bokaro Coalfield. Four of the six CD blocks in the district have coal mines – Patratu, Ramgarh, Mandu and Chitarpur. The high concentration of census towns in these blocks are noticeable on the map. Only two blocks, Gola and Dulmi, are totally rural areas. Ramgarh district lies in the central part of the Chota Nagpur Plateau. The Damodar valley covers most of the district. The forested areas in highlands to the north and the south of the valley can be seen in the map (mark the shaded areas). "Chotanagpur has a charm of its own… The entire area forms one of the most charming series of views imaginable. The far-off hills in the background in exquisite tints of blue or purple as the light falls, the nearer hills picturesquely shaped and luxuriant in every shade of green with their bold escarpments in black or grey, and the brown plains below furnishing their quota of colours."

Note: The map alongside presents some of the notable locations in the district. All places marked in the map are linked in the larger full screen map.

== Tata Steel ==
West Bokaro Colliery was established in 1948 by Anderson Wright. Tata Steel acquired it in 1956 and the West Bokaro Division came up in 1976. It is a fully mechanised opencast mine that produces {7 million tonnes per annum of coal for steel making at Jamshedpur.

Spread across a leasehold area of 4,300 acres (1,700 ha), it is a township with its own markets, schools, medical facilities, parks and other amenities. It has a 10,000-book knowledge centre covering a range of topics from managerial to mining. Medical facilities include Tata Central Hospital at Ghatotand and 6 dispensaries in nearby villages.

Hurdag coal block in the nearby Kotre Basantpur Panchmo area has been allotted to Tata Steel.

== Civic administration ==
West Bokaro Outpost of Jharkhand Police serves the area.

== Education ==
TATA DAV Public School, an English-medium coeducational institution, was established at Ghatotand in 1987. It has facilities for teaching from class I to class XII. It has 400 computers for learning purposes, a library with 11,325 books and a play ground.

Holy Cross School, an English-medium coeducational institution, was established at Ghatotand in 1983. It has facilities for teaching from the primary to the higher secondary stage. Shishu Niketan school is also set up at Rajendra Nagar/ Ghatotand
