= Ramgarh subdivision =

- Subdivision
- Location in Jharkhand, India Ramgarh subdivision (India)
- Coordinates: 23.62°N 85.48°E
- Country: India
- State: Jharkhand
- District: Ramgarh
- Headquarters: Ramgarh

Area
  - Total: 1,341.00 km^{2} (517.76 sq mi)

Population
  - Total: 949,443
  - Density: 708.011/km^{2} (1,833.74/sq mi)

Languages
  - Official: Hindi, Urdu
- Time zone: UTC+5:30 (IST)
- Website: ramgarh.nic.in

Ramgarh subdivision is an administrative subdivision of Ramgarh district in the North Chotanagpur division in the Indian state of Jharkhand.

== History ==
Around 1740, Ramgarh was "Jungle District of Ramgarh". With the East India Company acquiring the diwani of Bengal, Bihar and Odisha in 1765, it derived the right to collect revenue from the Ramgarh regime. In 1771, Ramgarh district had a Military Collector whose headquarter was in Chatra. After the Kol uprising in 1831, the British reorganised the administrative structure of the area. Hazaribagh emerged as an administrative centre. Ramgarh became a subdivision of Hazaribagh district in 1991 and was made a district in its won right in 2007.

== Administration ==
With only 2.87% of the population of the state residing in Ramgarh district, it is a small sized district. It is divided into 6 community development blocks with 340 villages (305 inhabited and 35 uninhabited), 1 statutory town and 22 census towns.

The details of Ramgarh subdivision are as follows:

Subdivision	Headquarters	Area km^{2}	Population (2011)	Rural population % (2011)	Urban population % (2011)
Ramgarh	Ramgarh	1341.00	949,443	55.9	44.1

Cities, towns and locations in Ramgarh district in North Chotanagpur Division
M: municipality, CT: census town, R: rural/ urban centre, T: tourist centre, P: power plant
Abbreviation used- TPP: thermal power project
Owing to space constraints in the small map, the actual locations in a larger map may vary slightly

== Demographics ==
According to the 2011 Census of India, Ramgarh subdivision had a population of 949,443, of which 530,488 were rural and 418,955 were urban. There were 494,230 (52%) males and 555,213 (48%) females. Population in the age range 0–6 years was 134,226 (14%). Scheduled Castes numbered 106,356 (11.20%) and Scheduled Tribes numbered 201,166 (21.19%).

=== Literacy ===
According to the 2011 census, the total number of literate persons in the Ramgarh subdivision was 596,497 (73.17% of the population over 6 years) out of which males numbered 350,351 (82.52% of the male population over 6 years) and females numbered 246,466 (63.09% of the female population over 6 years). The gender disparity (the difference between female and male literacy rates) was 19.43%.

See also – List of Jharkhand districts ranked by literacy rate

Literacy in CD Blocks of
Ramgarh district
Patratu – 75.00%
Mandu – 72.68%
Ramgarh – 70.96%
Dulmi – 67.62%
Chitarpur – 78.60%
Gola – 65.35%
Source: 2011 Census: CD Block Wise
Primary Census Abstract Data

== Police stations ==
Police stations in the Ramgarh subdivision are at:

1. Basal
2. Gola
3. Mandu
4. Patratu
5. Rajrappa
6. Ramgarh
7. Women

Outposts

1. Barkakana
2. Bhadani Nagar
3. Bhurkunda
4. Kuju
5. West Bokaro

== Blocks ==
Community development blocks in the Ramgarh subdivision are:

CD Block	Headquarters	Area km^{2}	Population (2011)	SC %	ST %	Literacy rate %	Census town
Ramgarh	Ramgarh	101.28	73,040	13.07	21.08	70.96	Sirka, Marar
Patratu	Patratu	256.19	247,841	26.08	12.91	75.00	Patratu, Saunda, Jainagar, Hesla, Balkundra, Lapanga, Barkakana
Mandu	Mandu	423.82	253,032	13.84	20.35	72.68	Mandu, Taping, Barughutu, Kedla, Ara, Kuju, Topa, Orla, Sanri alias Tilaiya, Bongabar, Seota
Chitarpur	Chitarpur	64.85	70,701	5.37	10.11	78.60	Chitarpur, Sewai
Gola	Gola	335.81	149,810	8.08	29.05	65.35	-
Dulmi	Dulmi	107.93	66,238	8.02	15.89	67.92	-

== Economy ==
=== Coal mining ===
As of 2021, four operational areas of Central Coalfields Limited were located partially in this subdivision: Barka Sayal Area, Argada Area, Kuju Area, and Hazaribagh Area. The Rajrappa Area of CCL is presently wholly in Ramgarh district but an extension is planned into Bokaro district.

In Ramgarh district, "Coal mining and coal-dependent industries contribute about 40 per cent of the district’s GDP. Moreover, one-fourth of the households depend directly on the coal industry for income, most of them being informal workers." However, while "overall, coal mining is a profitable industry. But almost 70 per cent of mines of Coal India Limited, India's largest coal producer, are running into losses, raising questions about the future of the coal industry." According to experts, India has to phase out coal-based power plants within the next 25 to 30 years. In Ramgarh district, which is a top coal-producing area, half of the coalmines have shut down/ closed, and among those being operated two-thirds are unprofitable.

=== Industries ===
Patratu Thermal Power Station at Patratu was commissioned its earlier units in 1966–72. The plant has become old and operates at a derated cpapcity.

The foundation stone for the 800 x 5 MW Patratu Super Thermal Power Project was laid by Narendra Modi, Prime Minister, in 2018.

Patratu Dam, was built to supply water for the Patratu Thermal Power Station. It has been built across the Nalkarni River, a tributary of the Damodar River and has an 81 sq mi reservoir.

Jindal Steel and Power has set up a 0.6 million tonnes per year wire rod mill and a 1 million tonnes per year bar mill at Patratu.

== Education ==
In 2011, Ramgarh subdivision out of the total 305 inhabited villages,125 villages had pre-primary schools, 280 villages housed primary schools, 154 villages had middle schools, 51 villages had secondary schools, 31 villages had senior secondary schools, 4 housed general degree colleges and 1 village has a non-formal training centre.
.*Senior secondary schools are also known as Inter colleges in Jharkhand

=== Educational institutions ===
The following institutions are located in Ramgarh subdivision:

- Ramgarh College established at Ramgarh Cantonment in 1963 and affiliated with Vinoba Bhave University offers courses in arts, science and commerce.
- Women's College, Ramgarh, affiliated with Vinoba Bhave University offers courses in arts and commerce.
- Ramgarh Engineering College, an engineering degree college, was established in 2013 at Murubanda, near Chitarpur.
- Patratu Thermal Power Station (PTPS) College, affiliated with Vinoba Bhave University was established at Patratu in 1972.
- Chotanagpur (CN) College, at Marar, affiliated with Vinoba Bhave University, offers courses in arts, science and commerce.
- J.M. College was established at Bhurkunda in 1979. Affiliated with Vinoba Bhave University, it offers courses in arts, science and commerce.
- Jubilee College was established at Bhurkunda in 1981. Affiliated with Vinoba Bhave University, it offers courses in arts, science and commerce.

(Information about degree colleges with proper reference may be added here)

== Healthcare ==
In 2011, in Ramgarh subdivision there were 9 villages with primary health centres, 81 villages with primary health subcentres, 9 villages with maternity and child welfare centres, 5 villages with allopathic hospitals, 5 villages with dispensaries, 6 villages with family welfare centres, 13 villages with medicine shops.
.*Private medical practitioners, alternative medicine etc. not included

=== Medical facilities ===
Central Coalfields Limited has following facilities in Ramgarh subdivision:

- Central Hospital, Naisarai at Ramgarh with 150 beds has 21 general duty medical officers and 12 specialists. Among the facilities it has are X‐ray, ECG, Ultra Sound, refraction unit, slit lamp, A‐ scan, keratometer, operating microscope, dentistry, audiometry equipment. It has 4 ambulances.
- AKC Bhurkunda (Hospital) at Bhurkunda with 35 beds has 4 general duty medical officers and 1 specialist. Among the facilities it has are: X‐ray machine, ECG machine, nebulizer, patho lab. It has 2 ambulances.
- Central Saunda Hospital at Saunda has 15 beds.
- ARH Sayal at Sayal with 20 beds has 1 general duty medical officer. Among the facilities it has are: X‐Ray machine, patho lab. It has 2 ambulances.
- S.C.Taping Regional Hospital at Premnagar, Taping with 20 beds, has 1 general duty medical officer. Among the facilities it has are: x-ray, laboratory. It has 1 ambulance.
- JRH Kedla Colliery Hospital at Kedla has 32 beds.
- Silver Jubilee Hospital Rajrappa mines at Sewai with 20 beds has 3 general duty medical officers. Among the facilities it has are: x-ray, laboratory. It has 2 ambulances.
- CWS Hospital at Barkakana (independent unit) with 11 beds has 3 general duty medical officers. Among the facilities it has is: laboratory. It has 1 ambulance.

(Anybody having referenced information about location of government/ private medical facilities may please add it here)
