= Kedla =

- Census Town
- Location in Jharkhand, India Kedla (India)
- Coordinates: 23.7893°N 85.5902°E
- Country: India
- State: Jharkhand
- District: Ramgarh district

Area
  - Total: 8.388 km^{2} (3.239 sq mi)

Population (2011)
  - Total: 16,054
  - Density: 1,914/km^{2} (4,957/sq mi)

Languages (*For language details see Mandu (community development block)#Language and religion)
  - Official: Hindi, Urdu
- Time zone: UTC+5:30 (IST)
- PIN: 829150
- Telephone/ STD code: 06545
- Vehicle registration: JH
- Lok Sabha constituency: Hazaribagh
- Vidhan Sabha constituency: Mandu
- Website: ramgarh.nic.in

Kedla is a census town in the Mandu CD block in the Ramgarh subdivision of the Ramgarh district in the Indian state of Jharkhand.

== Geography ==
Cities, towns and locations in Ramgarh district in North Chotanagpur Division
M: municipality, CT: census town, R: rural/ urban centre, T: tourist centre, P: power plant
Abbreviation used- TPP: thermal power project
Owing to space constraints in the small map, the actual locations in a larger map may vary slightly

=== Location ===
Kedla is located at 23.7893°N 85.5902°E.

=== Area overview ===
The map alongside provides links to five operational areas of Central Coalfields spread across South Karanpura Coalfield, Ramgarh Coalfield and West Bokaro Coalfield. Four of the six CD blocks in the district have coal mines – Patratu, Ramgarh, Mandu and Chitarpur. Only two blocks, Gola and Dulmi, are complete rural areas. Ramgarh district lies in the central part of the Chota Nagpur Plateau. The Damodar valley covers most of the district. The forested areas in highlands to the north and the south of the valley can be seen in the shaded areas of the map. "Chotanagpur has a charm of its own… The entire area forms one of the most charming series of views imaginable. The far-off hills in the background in exquisite tints of blue or purple as the light falls, the nearer hills picturesquely shaped and luxuriant in every shade of green with their bold escarpments in black or grey, and the brown plains below furnishing their quota of colours."

Note: The map alongside presents some of the notable locations in the district. All places marked in the map are linked in the larger full screen map.

== Demographics ==
According to the 2011 Census of India, Kedla had a total population of 16,054, of which 8,402 (53%) were males and 7,562 (47%) were females. Population in the age range 0–6 years was 2,092. The total number of literate persons in Kedla was 10,741 (76.93% of the population over 6 years).

As of 2001 India census, Kedla had a population of 10,588. Males constitute 65% of the population and females 35%. Kedla has an average literacy rate of 25%, much lower than the national average of 59.5%: male literacy is 32%, and female literacy is 21%. In Kedla, 45% of the population is under 6 years of age.

== Infrastructure ==
According to the District Census Handbook 2011, Ramgarh, Kedla covered an area of 8.388 km^{2}. Among the civic amenities, it had 40 km roads with open drains, the protected water supply involved tap water from treated sources, uncovered wells, pressure tanks. It had 3,359 domestic electric connections, 45 road lighting points. Among the medical facilities, it had 3 hospitals, 1 dispensary, 1 health centre, 30 family welfare centres, 1 maternity and child welfare centre, 1 maternity home, 40 nursing homes, 2 charitable hospital/ nursing homes, 2 medicine shops. Among the educational facilities it had 2 primary schools, 3 middle schools, 2 secondary schools, 1 senior secondary school, the nearest general degree college at Ramgarh Cantonment 25 km away. Among the social, recreational and cultural facilities it had 2 stadiums, 1 auditorium/ community hall. One important commodity it produced was coal. It had the branch offices of 1 nationalised bank, 1 agricultural credit society, 1 non-agricultural credit society.

== Economy ==
Kedla Open Cast Project (KOCP), Kedla Underground Project(KUGP), Jharkhand Open Cast Project(JOCP) and Kedla Coal Washery in the Hazaribagh Area of Central Coalfields Limited are operational at Kedla.

== Healthcare ==
Central Coalfields Limited has the JRH Kedla Colliery Hospital at Kedla with 32 beds.
