= Jainagar, Ramgarh =

Jainagar Jai Nagar
- Census Town
- Location in Jharkhand, India Jainagar (India)
- Coordinates: 23.6567°N 85.3225°E
- Country: India
- State: Jharkhand
- District: Ramgarh

Area
  - Total: 2.729 km^{2} (1.054 sq mi)

Population (2011)
  - Total: 5,347
  - Density: 1,959/km^{2} (5,075/sq mi)

Languages (*For language details see Patratu (community development block)#Language and religion)
  - Official: Hindi, Urdu
- Time zone: UTC+5:30 (IST)
- PIN: 829118
- Telephone/ STD code: 0651
- Vehicle registration: JH
- Lok Sabha constituency: Hazaribagh
- Vidhan Sabha constituency: Ramgarh
- Website: ramgarh.nic.in

Jainagar (also written as Jai Nagar or Jay Nagar) is a census town in the Patratu CD block in the Ramgarh subdivision of the Ramgarh district in the Indian state of Jharkhand.

== Geography ==
Cities, towns and locations in Ramgarh district in North Chotanagpur Division
M: municipality, CT: census town, R: rural/ urban centre, T: tourist centre, P: power plant
Abbreviation used- TPP: thermal power project
Owing to space constraints in the small map, the actual locations in a larger map may vary slightly

=== Location ===
Jainagar is located at 23.6567°N 85.3225°E.

=== Area overview ===
Ramgarh has a vibrant coal-mining sector. The map alongside provides links to five operational areas of Central Coalfields spread across South Karanpura Coalfield, Ramgarh Coalfield and West Bokaro Coalfield. Four of the six CD blocks in the district have coal mines – Patratu, Ramgarh, Mandu and Chitarpur. The high concentration of census towns in these blocks are noticeable on the map. Only two blocks, Gola and Dulmi, are totally rural areas. Ramgarh district lies in the central part of the Chota Nagpur Plateau. The Damodar valley covers most of the district. The forested areas in highlands to the north and the south of the valley can be seen in the map (mark the shaded areas). "Chotanagpur has a charm of its own… The entire area forms one of the most charming series of views imaginable. The far-off hills in the background in exquisite tints of blue or purple as the light falls, the nearer hills picturesquely shaped and luxuriant in every shade of green with their bold escarpments in black or grey, and the brown plains below furnishing their quota of colours."

Note: The map alongside presents some of the notable locations in the district. All places marked in the map are linked in the larger full screen map.

== Demographics ==
According to the 2011 Census of India, Jai Nagar had a total population of 5,347, of which 2,806 (52%) were males and 2,541 (48%) were females. Population in the age range 0–6 years was 803. The total number of literate persons in Jai Nagar was 4,544 (73.81% of the population over 6 years).

== Infrastructure ==
According to the District Census Handbook 2011, Ramgarh, Jainagar covered an area of 2.729 km^{2}. Among the civic amenities, it had 9 km roads with open drains, the protected water supply involved tap water from treated sources, uncovered wells, overhead tanks. It had 964 domestic electric connections, 15 road lighting points. Among the medical facilities, it had 5 hospitals, 2 dispensaries, 2 health centres, 4 family welfare centres, 6 maternity and child welfare centres, 4 maternity homes, 50 nursing homes, 5 medicine shops. Among the educational facilities it had 7 primary schools, 1 middle school, 1 secondary school, 1 senior secondary school, the nearest general degree college at Patratu 4 km away. Two important commodities it produced were saria and coal. It had the branch offices of 3 nationalised banks.

== Transport ==
There is a station at Patratu on the Barkakana-Son Nagar line.
