= Saunda =

- Census Town
- Location in Jharkhand, India Saunda (India)
- Coordinates: 23.66°N 85.35°E
- Country: India
- State: Jharkhand
- District: Ramgarh

Area
  - Total: 2.825 km^{2} (1.091 sq mi)

Population (2011)
  - Total: 81,915
  - Density: 29,000/km^{2} (75,100/sq mi)

Languages (*For language details see Patratu (community development block)#Language and religion)
  - Official: Hindi, Urdu
- Time zone: UTC+5:30 (IST)
- PIN: 829106
- Telephone/ STD code: 0651
- Vehicle registration: JH
- Lok Sabha constituency: Hazaribagh
- Vidhan Sabha constituency: Ramgarh
- Website: ramgarh.nic.in

Saunda is a census town in the Patratu (community development block) in the Ramgarh subdivision of the Ramgarh district in the Indian state of Jharkhand.

== Geography ==
Cities, towns and locations in Ramgarh district in North Chotanagpur Division
M: municipality, CT: census town, R: rural/ urban centre, T: tourist centre, P: power plant
Abbreviation used- TPP: thermal power project
Owing to space constraints in the small map, the actual locations in a larger map may vary slightly

=== Location ===
Saunda is located at 23.66°N 85.35°E.

=== Area overview ===
Ramgarh has a significant coal-mining sector. The map alongside shows five operational areas of Central Coalfields spread across South Karanpura Coalfield, Ramgarh Coalfield and West Bokaro Coalfield. Four of the six CD blocks in the district have coal mines – Patratu, Ramgarh, Mandu and Chitarpur. The high concentration of census towns in these blocks are noticeable on the map. Only two blocks, Gola and Dulmi, are entirely rural areas. Ramgarh district lies in the central part of the Chota Nagpur Plateau. The Damodar valley covers most of the district. The forested areas in highlands to the north and the south of the valley can be seen in the map (mark the shaded areas). "Chotanagpur has a charm of its own... The entire area forms one of the most charming series of views imaginable. The far-off hills in the background in exquisite tints of blue or purple as the light falls, the nearer hills picturesquely shaped and luxuriant in every shade of green with their bold escarpments in black or grey, and the brown plains below furnishing their quota of colours."

Note: The map alongside presents some of the notable locations in the district. All places marked in the map are linked in the larger full screen map.

== Demographics ==
According to the 2011 Census of India, Saunda had a total population of 81,915, of which 43,425 (53%) were males and 38,490 (47%) were females. Population in the age range 0-6 years was 10,073. The total number of literate persons in Saunda was 57,831 (80.50% of the population over 6 years).

As of 2001 India census, Saunda had a population of 85,037. Males constitute 55% of the population and females 45%. Saunda has an average literacy rate of 63%, higher than the national average of 59.5%: male literacy is 71%, and female literacy is 53%. In Saunda, 14% of the population is under 6 years of age.

== Economy ==
Central Saunda underground, Saunda D underground and Saunda underground coal mines are operational under the Barka Sayal Area of Central Coalfields Limited,

== Infrastructure ==
According to the District Census Handbook 2011, Ramgarh, Saunda covered an area of 2.825 km^{2}. Among the civic amenities, it had 95 km roads with open drains, the protected water supply involved tap water from treated sources, uncovered wells, overhead tanks. It had 14,872 domestic electric connections, 150 road lighting points. Among the medical facilities, it had 4 hospitals, 8 dispensaries, 8 health centres, 5 family welfare centres, 9 maternity and child welfare centres, 5 maternity homes, 7 nursing homes, 2 charitable hospital/ nursing homes, 3 medicine shops. Among the educational facilities it had 27 primary schools, 14 middle schools, 6 secondary schools, 1 senior secondary school, 2 general degree colleges. Among the social, recreational and cultural facilities it had 4 stadiums, 2 cinema theatres, 1 auditorium/ community hall. An important commodity it produced was coal. It had the branch offices of 2 nationalised banks, 1 private commercial bank,1 agricultural credit society, 2 non-agricultural credit societies.

== Healthcare ==
Central Coalfields Limited has the Central Saunda Hospital with 15 beds at Saunda.
