= Argada Area =

- Location in Jharkhand Argada Area (India)
- Location: South Karanpura Coalfield; 23.6477°N 85.4504°E
- Company: Central Coalfields Limited
- Website: centralcoalfields.in/cmpny/hstry.php

Argada Area is one of the operational areas of the Central Coalfields Limited located in the Ramgarh and Hazaribagh districts in the state of Jharkhand, India.

The projects of the Argada Area are Gidi A Open Cast, Gidi C opencast, Religara opencast/ underground, Sirka opencast, Sirka underground, Argada underground, and Giddi Washery. The area office is at Sirka, PO Argada 829101.

== Mining activity ==
Collieries in the CCL Argada Area (South Karanpura Colafield)
U: Underground colliery, O: Open cast colliery, M: Mixed colliery, W: Washery, S: Facility, A: Administrative headquarters, CT: Census town, H: Historical, religious, tourist centre
Owing to space constraints in the small map, the actual locations in a larger map may vary slightly.

=== Mines and projects ===
Gidi is an old colliery that started functioning in 1958. Several seams (Argada, Argada-A, Argada-B, Sirka, Bansgarha, Hatidhari and upper & lower Semana) have been worked by underground mining methods, either through independent mine entries / inclines or drifts from one seam to another. In addition, the mine has been worked by opencast methods in six patches (Quarries 1, 2, 3, 4, 5 and 6). Except Qaurries 2 and 3, all the other quarries are filled up water to a maximum water level of 336.20 metres (1,103.0 ft). Giddi-A open cast project is located in the east central part of South Karanpura Coalfield. All the underground workings of Giddi-A colliery were stopped since March 1984. Presently the mine operation is limited to opencast working in Quarry no. 3.

The Pre-Feasibility Report for working in Giddi-A colliery covers the area of existing working in Quarry nos. 2 and 3 of Giddi-A along with a new patch transferred from Religara Colliery in an adjacent location north east of Quarry no. 3. Two working sections have been envisaged in this scheme – the western section being an existing working section and the eastern section is a green field area. The combined mineable reserve of both the sections is 3.70 million tonnes. The estimated life of the eastern section is 6 years and the western section is 3 years.

Cities, towns and locations in Ramgarh district in North Chotanagpur Division
M: Municipality, CT: Census town, R: Rural/urban centre, T: Tourist centre, P: Power plant, TPP: Thermal power project
Owing to space constraints in the small map, the actual locations in a larger map may vary slightly.

The Sirka opencast project is located in the eastern part of the South Karanpura Coalfield. It was earlier owned by Bird & Company and was taken over at the time of nationalisation in 1973. At that time it produced 0.30-0.35 million tonnes per year, using both underground and opencast methods. As of 2012–13, Sirka project was operating in Argada Area with an annual capacity of 0.25 million tonnes per year of raw coal. Sirka is a census town in Ramgarh in Ramgarh district.

The Argada underground project is located in the eastern part of the South Karanpura Coalfield. It was earlier owned by Bird & Company and was taken over at the time of nationalisation in 1973. At that time, it produced 0.35 million tonnes per year, using underground methods. Argada underground project has a production capacity of 0.06 million tonnes per year. The Damodar flows along its western and southern boundaries. It is about 10 km from Ramgarh Cantonment.

Gidi Non-Coking Coal Washery was set up in 1975 with an installed capacity of 2.5 million tonnes per year. According to a newspaper report, Gidi Washery was closed in October 2020.

Note: For Hazaribagh district map see Barka Sayal Area.

== Illegal mining activities ==
According to the Report on Prevention of Illegal Coal Mining and Theft, “The main source of illegal mining of coal and theft is abandoned mines. After economic extraction is over, the remaining coal in an abandoned mine is stolen by coal mafias, villagers leading to roof falling, water flooding, poisonous gas leaking, leading to the death of many labourers.”In the Argada Area of CCL illegal mining activities are taking place in Argada B&J Incline, Sirka Quarry 1& 2, Gidi 1, 5, 2. Illegal mining also takes place in the fringe areas and outside the leasehold areas of CCL.

== Educational facilities for employees' children ==
Central Coalfields Limited provides support for reputed institutions and trusts for setting up 10+2 pattern CBSE schools for children of CCL employees. It provides 109 buses to take employees' children to schools and back. Among the schools in the South Karanpura Coalfield that receive financial help or structural support are DAV Urimari and DAV Gidi and saraswati vidya mandir sirka.

== Medical facilities ==
In the South Karanpura Coalfield, CCL has the following facilities:

AKC Bhurkunda (Hospital) at Bhurkunda, with 35 beds, has four general duty medical officers and one specialist. Its facilities include X-ray machine, ECG machine, nebulizer, patho lab. It has two ambulances.

Central Saunda Hospital at Saunda has 15 beds.

ARH Sayal at Sayal, with 20 beds, has one general duty medical officer. Its facilities include X-ray machine and patho lab. It has two ambulances.

There are central facilities in the Central Hospital, Gandhinagar at Kanke Road, Ranchi with 250 beds and in the Central Hospital, Naisarai at Ramgarh with 150 beds.

AKC, Gidi A at Gidi, with 31 beds, has six general duty medical officers and one specialist. Its facilities include an X-ray machine. It has three ambulances.

There are dispensaries at Sirka and Gidi C in the Argada Area, and at Urimari in the Barka Sayal Area.
