= Mandu, Jharkhand =

Mandu
- Census Town
- Location in Jharkhand Mandu (India)
- Coordinates: 23.7942°N 85.4700°E
- Country: India
- State: Jharkhand
- District: Ramgarh

Area
  - Total: 17.052 km^{2} (6.584 sq mi)
- Elevation: 508 m (1,667 ft)

Population (2011)
  - Total: 10,223
  - Density: 599.52/km^{2} (1,552.7/sq mi)

Languages (*For language details see Mandu (community development block)#Language and religion)
  - Official: Hindi, Urdu
- Time zone: UTC+5:30 (IST)
- PIN: 825316
- Telephone/ STD code: 06545
- Vehicle registration: JH
- Lok Sabha constituency: Hazaribagh
- Vidhan Sabha constituency: Mandu
- Website: ramgarh.nic.in

Mandu is a census town in the Mandu CD block in the Ramgarh subdivision of the Ramgarh district, Jharkhand, India.

== Geography ==
Cities, towns and locations in Ramgarh district in North Chotanagpur Division
M: municipality, CT: census town, R: rural/ urban centre, T: tourist centre, P: power plant
Abbreviation used- TPP: thermal power project
Owing to space constraints in the small map, the actual locations in a larger map may vary slightly

=== Location ===
Mandu is located at 23°47′39″N 85°28′12″E. It has an average elevation of 508 metres (1,667 ft).

Mandu is surrounded by hills. Gandhauniya is natural hot water spring which is popular among local people.

Dhoodhi nadi is a picnic spot for new year celebration. Other sight seeing places include elephant stone, Dear's foot print,

Tapin Dam is also famous here. Jhoda Talab (two ponds) are situated at both sides of NH-33 Highway which is a noted identification mark.

=== Area overview ===
Ramgarh has a coal-mining sector. The map alongside provides links to five operational areas of Central Coalfields spread across South Karanpura Coalfield, Ramgarh Coalfield and West Bokaro Coalfield. Four of the six CD blocks in the district have coal mines – Patratu, Ramgarh, Mandu and Chitarpur. The high concentration of census towns in these blocks are noticeable on the map. Only two blocks, Gola and Dulmi, are entirely rural areas. Ramgarh district lies in the central part of the Chota Nagpur Plateau. The Damodar valley covers most of the district. The forested areas in highlands to the north and the south of the valley can be seen in the map (mark the shaded areas). Chotanagpur is very charming with picturesque views.

Note: The map alongside presents some of the notable locations in the district. All places marked in the map are linked in the larger full screen map.

== Civic administration ==
=== Police station ===
Mandu police station serves Mandu CD block.

=== CD block HQ ===
The headquarters of Mandu CD block is located at Mandu town.

== Demographics ==
According to the 2011 Census of India, Mandu had a total population of 10,223, of which 5,450 (53%) were males and 4,773 (47%) were females. Population in the age range 0-6 years was 1,457. The total number of literate persons in Mandu was 6,383 (72.82% of the population over 6 years).

== Infrastructure ==
According to the District Census Handbook 2011, Ramgarh, Mandu covered an area of 17.052 km^{2}. Among the civic amenities, it had 27 km roads with open drains, the protected water supply involved tap water from treated sources, overhead tank. It had 1,043 domestic electric connections. Among the medical facilities, it had 6 hospitals, 1 dispensary, 1 health centre, 3 family welfare centres, 6 maternity and child welfare centres, 4 maternity homes, 1 nursing home, 5 medicine shops. Among the educational facilities it had 3 primary schools, 4 middle schools, 3 secondary schools, 1 general degree college. It had 1 non-formal educational centre (Sarva Siksha Abhiyan). Among the social, recreational and cultural facilities it had 3 working women’s hostels. One important commodity it produced was coal. It had the branch office of 1 nationalised bank.

== Transport ==
National Highway 33 passes through Mandu. The nearest railway station is at Imli tand.

== Education ==
Although there is an adequate number of schools like DCA, MKPS, SSVM, High School, MS, DAV AGRASEN, DAV GHATO, DAV TAPIN nearby, the literacy rate is quite low here.
