= Ukrid =

Ukrid is a village in Dulmi community development block, which is a part of Ramgarh district in Jharkhand state, India.

Ukrid is situated in the main area of Bokaro near to Bari Co-operative, Sector-12 and co-operative colony.

== Demographics ==
Covering 387 hectares (960 acres) and comprising 344 households at the time of the 2011 census of India, Ukrid had a population of 2054. There were 1056 males and 998 females, with 330 people being aged six or younger.

The same census recorded a similarly named place in Patratu tehsil, with an area of 154 hectares (380 acres) but no inhabitants.
