= Bhurkunda =

- Town
- Location in Jharkhand, India Bhurkunda (India)
- Coordinates: 23.6564°N 85.3595°E
- Country: India
- State: Jharkhand

Languages (*For language details see Patratu (community development block)#Language and religion)
  - Official: Hindi, Urdu
- Time zone: UTC+5:30 (IST)
- PIN: 829135
- Telephone/ STD code: 0651
- Vehicle registration: JH-24
- Lok Sabha constituency: Hazaribagh
- Vidhan Sabha constituency: Ramgarh
- Website: ramgarh.nic.in

Bhurkunda is a town in the Patratu CD block in the Ramgarh subdivision of the Ramgarh district in Jharkhand, India.

== Geography ==
Cities, towns and locations in Ramgarh district in North Chotanagpur Division
M: municipality, CT: census town, R: rural/ urban centre, T: tourist centre, P: power plant
Abbreviation used- TPP: thermal power project
Owing to space constraints in the small map, the actual locations in a larger map may vary slightly

=== Location ===
Bhurkunda is approximately 52 kilometres (32 mi) north-east of Ranchi, the state capital of Jharkhand.

=== Area overview ===
Ramgarh has a large coal-mining sector. The map alongside provides links to five operational areas of Central Coalfields spread across South Karanpura Coalfield, Ramgarh Coalfield and West Bokaro Coalfield. Four of the six CD blocks in the district have coal mines – Patratu, Ramgarh, Mandu and Chitarpur. The high concentration of census towns in these blocks are noticeable on the map. Only two blocks, Gola and Dulmi, are totally rural areas. Ramgarh district lies in the central part of the Chota Nagpur Plateau. The Damodar valley covers most of the district. The forested areas in highlands to the north and the south of the valley can be seen in the map (mark the shaded areas). "Chotanagpur has a charm of its own… The entire area forms one of the most charming series of views imaginable. The far-off hills in the background in exquisite tints of blue or purple as the light falls, the nearer hills picturesquely shaped and luxuriant in every shade of green with their bold escarpments in black or grey, and the brown plains below furnishing their quota of colours."

Note: The map alongside presents some of the notable locations in the district. All places marked in the map are linked in the larger full screen map.

== Civic administration ==
There is a Police Outpost at Bhurkunda.

== Economy ==
Projects in the Barka Sayal Area of Central Coalfields are: Bhurkunda U/G, Central Saunda U/G, Saunda-D U/G, Saunda U/G, Sayal-D U/G, Urimari U/G, Urimari O/C, North Urimari/ Birsa O/C and Bhurkunda O/C.

== Transport ==
There is a railway station in Bhurkunda. The Palamu Express and Muri Express used to stop here. Nearby stations are at Barkakana Junction and Patratu.

Bhurkunda is on State Highway 2.

There is a small bus and auto stand in Bhurkunda, with services from Bhurkunda to Ranchi, Ramgarh, Barkagaon, Hazaribagh, Gaya, Taregana, Patna and elsewhere.

== Education ==
J.M. College was established at Bhurkunda in 1979. Affiliated with Vinoba Bhave University, it offers courses in arts, science and commerce.

Jubilee College was established at Bhurkunda in 1981. Affiliated with Vinoba Bhave University, it offers courses in arts, science and commerce.

== Healthcare ==
AKC Bhurkunda (Hospital) of Central Coalfields Limited at Bhurkunda with 35 beds has 4 general duty medical officers and 1 specialist. Among the facilities it has are: X-ray machine, ECG machine, nebulizer, patho lab. It has 2 ambulances.
