= Ramgarh (community development block) =

- Community development block
- Location in Jharkhand Ramgarh (India)
- Coordinates: 23.6302°N 85.5193°E
- Country: India
- State: Jharkhand
- District: Ramgarh

Government
  - Type: Federal democracy

Area
  - Total: 101.28 km^{2} (39.10 sq mi)
- Elevation: 333 m (1,093 ft)

Population (2011)
  - Total: 73,040
  - Density: 721.2/km^{2} (1,868/sq mi)

Languages
  - Official: Hindi, Urdu
- Time zone: UTC+5:30 (IST)
- PIN: 829122 (Ramgarh Cantt)
- Telephone/ STD code: 06553
- Vehicle registration: JH
- Lok Sabha constituency: Hazaribagh
- Vidhan Sabha constituency: Ramgarh
- Website: ramgarh.nic.in

Ramgarh (community development block) is an administrative division in the Ramgarh subdivision of the Ramgarh district in the Indian state of Jharkhand.

== Maoist activities ==
Jharkhand is one of the states affected by Maoist activities. As of 2012, Ramgarh was not among the highly affected districts in the state. According to the Jharkhand Police spokesperson and Inspector General (IG) Saket Singh, as reported on 8 December 2020, "The activities of CPI-Maoist are now confined to small pockets in the state because of our efforts." Civilian fatalities, a key index of security in a region, declined from 20 in 2019, to 8 in 2020, the lowest in this category since 2000, when there were 13 such fatalities. The 28 total fatalities recorded in 2020 are also the lowest overall fatalities recorded in the state in a year since 2000, when they stood at 36.

== Geography ==
Ramgarh is located at 23°37′49″N 85°31′09″E. It has an average elevation of 333 metres (1,093 ft).

A major portion of the district is a part of the Damodar trough on the Chota Nagpur Plateau. The Ranchi Plateau, the largest part of the Chotanagpur Plateau is on the south and the Hazaribagh Plateau is on the north. The Damodar is the principal river of the district. The main tributaries of Damodar in the area are Naikari, Bhairavi/ Bhera and Bokaro. The Subarnarekha flows through the south-eastern part of the district. The Rajrappa falls and Naikari dam are important landmarks.

Ramgarh CD block is bounded by the Dadi CD block in the Hazaribagh district, the Mandu CD block, Gomia CD block in Bokaro district on the north, the Chitarpur and Dulmi CD blocks on the east, the Ormanjhi CD block in the Ranchi district on the south, and the Patratu CD block on the west.

Ramgarh CD block has an area of 101.28 km^{2}.Ramgarh police station serves Ramgarh CD block. The headquarters of Ramgarh CD block is located at Ramgarh town.

== Demographics ==
=== Population ===
According to the 2011 Census of India, Ramgarh CD block had a total population of 73,040, of which 47,871 were rural and 25,169 were urban. There were 37,670 (52%) males and 35,370 (48%) females. Population in the age range 0–6 years was 10,734. Scheduled Castes numbered 9,543 (13.07%) and Scheduled Tribes numbered 15,397 (21.08%).

Sirka and Marar are census towns in Ramgarh CD block.

=== Literacy ===
According to the 2011 census, the total number of literate persons in the Ramgarh CD block was 44,211 (70.96% of the population over 6 years) out of which males numbered 25,829 (80.60% of the male population over 6 years) and females numbered 18,382 (60.74% of the female population over 6 years). The gender disparity (the difference between female and male literacy rates) was 19.86%.

See also – List of Jharkhand districts ranked by literacy rate

Literacy in CD Blocks of
Ramgarh district
Patratu – 75.00%
Mandu – 72.68%
Ramgarh – 70.96%
Dulmi – 67.62%
Chitarpur – 78.60%
Gola – 65.35%
Source: 2011 Census: CD Block Wise
Primary Census Abstract Data

=== Language and religion ===
Religions in Ramgarh CD block (2011)
| Religion | Percent |
| Hinduism | 84.47% |
| Islam | 10.51% |
| Sikhism | 2.23% |
| Sarna | 1.52% |
| Christianity | 0.89% |
| Other or not stated | 0.38% |

Hindi is the official language in Jharkhand and Urdu has been declared as an additional official language.

Languages of Ramgarh CD block (2011)
1. Khortha (41.8%)
2. Hindi (33.5%)
3. Urdu (6.82%)
4. Bhojpuri (3.68%)
5. Magahi (3.44%)
6. Bengali (2.54%)
7. Punjabi (2.40%)
8. Nagpuri (1.58%)
9. Maithili (1.06%)
10. Others (3.24%)

At the time of the 2011 census, 41.76% of the population spoke Khortha, 33.48% Hindi, 6.82% Urdu, 3.68% Bhojpuri, 3.44% Magahi, 2.54% Bengali, 2.40% Punjabi, 1.58% Nagpuri and 1.06% Maithili as their first language.

== Rural poverty ==
Ramgarh district was carved out of Hazaribagh district in 2007. In 2004–2005, 40-50% of the population of Hazaribagh district were in the BPL category, being in the same category as Godda, Giridih and Koderma districts. Rural poverty in Jharkhand declined from 66% in 1993–94 to 46% in 2004–05. In 2011, it has come down to 39.1%.

== Economy ==
=== Livelihood ===
Livelihood
in Ramgarh CD block
1. Cultivators (18.0%)
2. Agricultural labourers (6.67%)
3. Household industries (2.78%)
4. Other Workers (72.5%)

In the Ramgarh CD block in 2011, among the class of total workers, cultivators numbered 9,898 and formed 18.03%, agricultural labourers numbered 3,660 and formed 6.67%, household industry workers numbered 1,526 and formed 2.78% and other workers numbered 39,807 and formed 72.52%. Total workers numbered 54,891 and formed 33.92% of the total population, and non-workers numbered 106,903 and formed 66.08% of the population.

=== Infrastructure ===
There are 20 inhabited villages in the Ramgarh CD block. In 2011, 18 villages had power supply. 3 villages had tap water (treated/ untreated), 19 villages had well water (covered/ uncovered), 20 villages had hand pumps, and all villages had drinking water facility. 6 villages had post offices, 6 villages had sub post offices, 6 villages had telephones (land lines), 14 villages had mobile phone coverage. 20 villages had pucca (paved) village roads, 11 villages had bus service (public/ private), 2 villages had autos/ modified autos, 9 villages had taxi/vans and 5 villages had tractors. 4 villages had bank branches. 17 villages had public distribution system, 2 villages had weekly haat (market) and 15 villages had assembly polling stations.

=== Coal mining ===
The projects of the Argada Area of Central Coalfields are: Gidi A Open Cast, Gidi C opencast, Religara opencast/ underground, Sirka opencast, Sirka underground, Argada underground, Giddi Washery. The area office is at Sirka, PO Argada 829101.

== Transport ==
Ramgarh Cantonment railway station is on the Barkakana-Muri-Chandil line.

== Education ==
Ramgarh CD block had 8 villages with pre-primary schools, 20 villages with primary schools, 15 villages with middle schools, 9 villages with secondary schools, 5 villages with senior secondary schools, 1 village with general degree college.
.*Senior secondary schools are also known as Inter colleges in Jharkhand

== Healthcare ==
Ramgarh CD block had 1 village with primary health centre, 9 villages with primary health subcentres, 1 village with medicine shop.
.*Private medical practitioners, alternative medicine etc. not included
