= Religara =

Religara Pachhiari
- Census Town
- Location in Jharkhand, India Religara (India)
- Coordinates: 23.68917°N 85.37026°E
- Country: India
- State: Jharkhand
- District: Hazaribagh

Population (2011)
  - Total: 8,239

Languages (*For language details see Dadi (community development block)#Language and religion)
  - Official: Hindi, Urdu
- Time zone: UTC+5:30 (IST)
- PIN: 829129 (Religara)
- Telephone/ STD code: 06545
- Vehicle registration: JH 02
- Website: hazaribag.nic.in

Religara, also called Pachhiari, is a census town in the Dadi CD block in the Hazaribagh Sadar subdivision of the Hazaribagh district in the Indian state of Jharkhand.

== Geography ==
Cities, towns and locations in Hazaribagh district in North Chotanagpur Division
Some census towns and locations around Hazaribagh city have been shown in the Hazaribagh City map
M: municipality, CT: census town, R: rural/ urban centre, T: tourist centre, D: dam, HS: hot spring
Owing to space constraints in the small map, the actual locations in a larger map may vary slightly

=== Location ===
Religara is located at 23.68917°N 85.37026°E.

=== Area overview ===
Hazaribagh district is a plateau area and forests occupy around about 45% of the total area. It is a predominantly rural area with 92.34% of the population living in rural areas against 7.66% in the urban areas. There are many census towns in the district, as can be seen in the map alongside. Agriculture is the main occupation of the people but with the extension of coal mines, particularly in the southern part of the district, employment in coal mines is increasing. However, it has to be borne in mind that modern mining operations are highly mechanised. Four operational areas of Central Coalfields are marked on the map. All these areas are spread across partly this district and partly the neighbouring districts.

Note: The map alongside presents some of the notable locations in the district. All places marked in the map are linked in the larger full screen map. Urbanisation data calculated on the basis of census data for CD blocks and may vary a little against unpublished official data.

== Demographics ==
According to the 2011 Census of India, Religara had a total population of 8,239, of which 4,270 (52%) were males and 3,969 (48%) were females. Population in the age range 0–6 years was 996. The total number of literate persons in Religara was 5,547 (76.58% of the population over 6 years).

As of 2001 India census, Religara alias Pachhiari had a population of 7,470. Males constitute 53% of the population and females 47%. Religara alias Pachhiari has an average literacy rate of 61%, higher than the national average of 59.5%: male literacy is 69%, and female literacy is 51%. In Religara alias Pachhiari, 14% of the population is under 6 years of age.

== Infrastructure ==
According to the District Census Handbook 2011, Hazaribagh, Religara covered an area of 3.33 km^{2}. Among the civic amenities, it had 13 km roads with open drains, the protected water supply involved uncovered well, tapwater from untreated sources and service reservoir. It had 1,563 domestic electric connections, 186 road lighting points. Among the educational facilities it had 5 primary schools, 2 middle schools, 2 secondary schools, 1 senior secondary school. The nearest general degree college at Ramgarh, 33 km away. Among the social, recreational and cultural facilities, it had 1 stadium, 1 auditorium/ community hall. Three important commodities it manufactured were gate/ grill, furniture, soil item. It had the branch offices of 1 nationalised bank, 1 agricultural credit society, 1 non-agricultural credit society.

== Economy ==
Projects in the Argada Area of Central Coalfields are: Gidi A O/C, Gidi C O/C, Religara O/C, U/G, Sirka O/C, Sirka U/G, Argada UG and Gidi Washery.

== Transport ==
Patratu railway station, on the Barkakana-Son Nagar line, serves this area. Religara is easily accessible by local buses and taxis from Patratu. The nearest airport is Ranchi Airport.
