= Barka Sayal Area =

- Location in Jharkhand Barka Sayal Area (India)
- Location: South Karanpura Coalfield; 23.6811°N 85.3258°E
- Company: Central Coalfields Limited
- Website: centralcoalfields.in/cmpny/hstry.php

Barka Sayal Area is one of the operational areas of the Central Coalfields Limited located mostly in the Ramgarh district, with a small portion in Hazaribagh district, in the state of Jharkhand, India.

The projects of the Barka Sayal Area are Bhurkunda underground, Central Saunda underground, Saunda D underground, Saunda underground, Sayal D underground, Urimari underground, North Urimari/ Birsa opencast, an Bhurkunda opencast. The area office is at Sayal, PO Saunda.

== Mining activity ==
Collieries in CCL Barka Sayal Area (South Karanpura Coalfield)
U: Underground colliery, O: Open cast colliery, A: Administrative headquarters, CT: Census town
Owing to space constraints in the small map, the actual locations in a larger map may vary slightly.

=== Mines and projects ===
Bhurkunda colliery is an old mine operating in the South Karanpura Coalfield of Central Coalfields Ltd, in Ramgarh district. As of 2016–17, it was proposed to develop two separate projects – Bhurkunda underground and Bhurkunda open cast projects. Ramgarh Cantonment is 16 km on the east and Patratu is 10 km on the west.

State Railways started the mine in 1924. It was transferred to National Coal Development Corporation in 1956 and to CCL in 1973. A project report, covering both the underground and opencast mine, was prepared in 1959, for a production of 1.04 million tonnes per year. At that time mineable reserve was estimated at 99 million tonnes. A project report for reorganisation of Bhurkunda underground mine was prepared in 1996. As of 2016–17, Hathidari and Bansgarha seams were being worked by bord and pillar system of mining. Production from Bhurkunda underground mine was 1.43 lakh tonnes in 2012–13, 1.49 lakh tonnes in 2013–14, 0.85 lakh tonnes in 2014-15 and 1.02 lakh tonnes in 2015–16. There are 11 seams in the Bhurkunda underground mine. These are (in order from top to bottom): 1. Kurse 2. Upper Nakari 3. Lower Nakari 4. Upper Semana 5. Lower Semana 6. Hathidari 7. Bansgarha 8. Upper Sirka 9. Lower Sirka 10. Argada 11. Argada A. The overburden from Balkudra open cast project is being dumped on the surface above the Hathidari an Bansgarha seams. Both the seams are classified as degree II for gassiness. In the project report, it is proposed to produce 0.3 million tonnes per year from Hathidari and Bansgarha seams. With an extractable reserve of 4.2 million tonnes in the two seams, the life of the mine is estimated to be around 20 years.

Cities, towns and locations in Hazaribagh district in North Chotanagpur Division
Some census towns and locations around Hazaribagh city have been shown in the Hazaribagh City map.
M: Municipality, CT: Census town, R: Rural/urban centre, T: Tourist centre, D: Dam, HS: Hot spring
Owing to space constraints in the small map, the actual locations in a larger map may vary slightly.

Bhurkunda open cast project consists of two blocks: Bhurkunda and Bhurkunda North Extension. The Bhurkunda block comprises a number of existing and discontinued underground and open cast workings. The entire Bhurkunda North Extension is a virgin area with a large built-up area belonging to CCL and some forest area to be acquired. The UG workings (separate from the UG mine project mentioned above) are waterlogged and discontinued. The OC workings are either waterlogged or dumped with overburden. Few galleries of abandoned and waterlogged UG workings of adjoining Saunda Colliery (in Sirka, Argada-A seams) are present in the area and as a precautionary measure a 60 m barrier is proposed. The normative production of the OCP project is proposed to be 1.75 million tonnes per year. With a mineable reserve of 9.3 million tonnes, the life of the mine is estimated to be 9 years, including 2 years of construction period.

Saunda D colliery was opened by Bird & Co. in 1946. Production from the underground mine in 2013-14 was 0.048 million tonnes. It is located in the South Karanpura Coalfield in the Patratu (community development block) in Ramgarh district. A new open cast mine was started in 1994–95.As of 2013, it had an annual production capacity of 0.93 million tonnes.

North Urimari open cast project is located in the northern portion of the South Karanpura Coalfield in the Barkagaon (community development block) in the Hazaribagh district. The mine is divided into two parts by natural faults: Eastern and Western Quarries. In 1994, the project had obtained clearance for a production of 3 million tonnes per year. The total balance mineable reserves were estimated at 80.81 million tonnes.

Urimari underground project is located in the South Karanpura Coalfield in the Patratu (community development block) in Ramgarh district. In 1990, it had an approved production capacity of 0.36 million tonnes per year. The mine has been worked manually by the board and pillar method. In 2014, it was producing around 0.050 million tonnes per year. The balance mineable reserve in the mine was 3.55 million tonnes. If worked at the rated capacity, with some refurbishing, the mine will have a life of around 10 years. Subsequent mine closure plan has also been worked out.

Note: For Ramgarh district map please see Argada Area.

== Educational facilities for employees' children ==
Central Coalfields Limited provides support for reputed institutions and trusts for setting up 10+2 pattern CBSE schools for children of CCL employees. It provides 109 buses to take employees' children to schools and back. Among the schools in the South Karanpura Coalfield that receive financial help or structural support are DAV Urimari and DAV Gidi.

== Medical facilities ==
In the South Karanpura Coalfield, CCL has the following facilities:

AKC Bhurkunda (Hospital) at Bhurkunda, with 35 beds, has four general duty medical officers and one specialist. Its facilities include X-ray machine, ECG machine, nebulizer, and patho lab. It has two ambulances.

Central Saunda Hospital at Saunda has 15 beds.

ARH Sayal at Sayal, with 20 beds, has one general duty medical officer. Its facilities include X-ray machine, patho lab. It has two ambulances.

AKC, Gidi A at Gidi, with 31 beds, has six general duty medical officer and one specialist. Its facilities include an X-ray machine. It has three ambulances.

There are central facilities in the Central Hospital, Gandhinagar at Kanke Road, Ranchi with 250 beds, and in the Central Hospital, Naisarai at Ramgarh with 150 beds.

There are dispensaries at Sirka and Gidi C in the Argada Area, and at Urimari in the Barka Sayal Area.
