= Gidi, Hazaribagh =

Gidi
- Census Town
- Location in Jharkhand, India Gidi (India)
- Coordinates: 23.68787°N 85.36176°E
- Country: India
- State: Jharkhand
- District: Hazaribagh

Government
  - Body: Federal democracy

Population (2011)
  - Total: 13,356

Languages (*For language details see Dadi (community development block)#Language and religion)
  - Official: Hindi, Urdu
- Time zone: UTC+5:30 (IST)
- PIN: 829108 (Gidi A); 829109 (Gidi C)
- Telephone/ STD code: 06545
- Vehicle registration: JH 02
- Website: hazaribag.nic.in

Gidi is a census town in Dadi CD block in the Hazaribagh Sadar subdivision of the Hazaribagh district in the Indian state of Jharkhand.

== Geography ==
Cities, towns and locations in Hazaribagh district in North Chotanagpur Division
Some census towns and locations around Hazaribagh city have been shown in the Hazaribagh City map
M: municipality, CT: census town, R: rural/ urban centre, T: tourist centre, D: dam, HS: hot spring
Owing to space constraints in the small map, the actual locations in a larger map may vary slightly

=== Location ===
Gidi is located at 23.68787°N 85.36176°E.

=== Area overview ===
Hazaribagh district is a plateau area and forests occupy around about 45% of the total area. It is a predominantly rural area with 92.34% of the population living in rural areas against 7.66% in the urban areas. There are many census towns in the district, as can be seen in the map alongside. Agriculture is the main occupation of the people but with the extension of coal mines, particularly in the southern part of the district, employment in coal mines is increasing. However, it has to be borne in mind that modern mining operations are highly mechanised. Four operational areas of Central Coalfields are marked on the map. All these areas are spread across partly this district and partly the neighbouring districts.

Note: The map alongside presents some of the notable locations in the district. All places marked in the map are linked in the larger full screen map. Urbanisation data calculated on the basis of census data for CD blocks and may vary a little against unpublished official data.

== Civic administration ==
=== Police station ===
Gidi police station serves the Dadi CD block.

== Demographics ==
According to the 2011 Census of India, Gidi had a total population of 13,356, of which 6,989 (52%) were males and 6,367 (48%) were females. Population in the age range 0–6 years was 1,670. The total number of literate persons in Gidi was 9,496 (81.26% of the population over 6 years).

As of the 2001 India census, Gidi has a population of 13,659. Males constitute 55% of the population and females 45%. Gidi has an average literacy rate of 68%, higher than the national average of 59.5%: male literacy is 76%, and female literacy is 59%. In Gidi, 14% of the population is under 6 years of age.

== Infrastructure ==
According to the District Census Handbook 2011, Hazaribagh, Gidi covered an area of 7.86 km^{2}. Among the civic amenities, it had 15 km roads with open drains, the protected water supply involved uncovered well, tapwater from treated and untreated sources and service reservoir. It had 2,640 domestic electric connections, 40 road lighting points. Among the educational facilities it had 13 primary schools, 4 middle schools, 3 secondary schools, the nearest senior secondary school at Religara 2 km away, the nearest general degree college at Ramgarh, 28 km away. Among the social, recreational and cultural facilities, it had 1 stadium, 1 cinema theatre, 1 auditorium/ community hall. Three important commodities it manufactured were gate/ grill, furniture, soil item. It had the branch offices of 2 nationalised banks, 1 non-agricultural credit society.

== Economy ==
Gidi is in the South Karanpura Coalfield. There is a coal washery at Gidi.

Projects in the Argada Area of Central Coalfields are: Gidi A O/C, Gidi C O/C, Religara O/C, U/G, Sirka O/C, Sirka U/G, Argada UG and Gidi Washery.

== Transport ==
The Kuju-Giddi Road links this area to Kuju on NH 20.

== Education ==
DAV Public School, Gidi A, is an English medium coeducational school, following CBSE course. It was established in 2003.

== Healthcare ==
There is a Regional Hospital of Central Coalfields, with 31 beds, at Gidi.
