= Mandu (community development block) =

- Community development block
- Location in Jharkhand Mandu (India)
- Coordinates: 23.7942°N 85.4700°E
- Country: India
- State: Jharkhand
- District: Ramgarh

Government
  - Type: Federal democracy

Area
  - Total: 423.82 km^{2} (163.64 sq mi)
- Elevation: 508 m (1,667 ft)

Population (2011)
  - Total: 252,032
  - Density: 594.67/km^{2} (1,540.2/sq mi)

Languages
  - Official: Hindi, Urdu
- Time zone: UTC+5:30 (IST)
- PIN: 825316
- Telephone/ STD code: 06545
- Vehicle registration: JH
- Lok Sabha constituency: Hazaribagh
- Vidhan Sabha constituency: Mandu
- Website: ramgarh.nic.in

Mandu (community development block) is an administrative division in the Ramgarh subdivision of the Ramgarh district in the Indian state of Jharkhand.

== Maoist activities ==
Jharkhand is one of the states affected by Maoist activities. As of 2012, Ramgarh was not among the highly affected districts in the state. According to the Jharkhand Police spokesperson and Inspector General (IG) Saket Singh, as reported on 8 December 2020, "The activities of CPI-Maoist are now confined to small pockets in the state because of our efforts." Civilian fatalities, a key index of security in a region, declined from 20 in 2019, to 8 in 2020, the lowest in this category since 2000, when there were 13 such fatalities. The 28 total fatalities recorded in 2020 are also the lowest overall fatalities recorded in the state in a year since 2000, when they stood at 36.

== Geography ==
Mandu is located at 23.7942°N 85.4700°E. It has an average elevation of 508 metres (1,667 ft).

A major portion of the district is a part of the Damodar trough on the Chota Nagpur Plateau. The Ranchi Plateau, the largest part of the Chotanagpur Plateau is on the south and the Hazaribagh Plateau is on the north. The Damodar is the principal river of the district. The main tributaries of Damodar in the area are Naikari, Bhairavi/ Bhera and Bokaro. The Subarnarekha flows through the south-eastern part of the district. The Rajrappa falls and Naikari dam are important landmarks.

Mandu CD block is bounded by the Churchu and Tati Jhariya CD blocks in the Hazaribagh district on the north, the Gomia CD block in the Bokaro district on the east, the Ramgarh CD block on the south, and the Dadi CD block in the Hazaribagh district on the west.

Mandu CD block has an area of 423.82 km^{2}. Mandu police station serves Mandu CD block. The headquarters of Mandu CD block is located at Mandu town.

== Demographics ==
=== Population ===
According to the 2011 Census of India, Mandu CD block had a total population of 253,032, of which 133,757 were rural and 119,275 were urban. There were 131,486 (52%) males and 121,546 (48%) females. Population in the age range 0–6 years was 36,312. Scheduled Castes numbered 35,015 (13.84%) and Scheduled Tribes numbered 51,493 (20.35%).

Mandu, Taping, Barughutu, Kedla, Ara, Kuju, Topa, Orla, Sanri alias Tilaiya, Bongabar and Seota are census towns in the Mandu CD block.

=== Literacy ===
According to the 2011 census, the total number of literate persons in the Mandu CD block was 157,513 (72.68% of the population over 6 years) out of which males numbered 92,295 (81.98% of the male population over 6 years) and females numbered 65,218 (62.62% of the female population over 6 years). The gender disparity (the difference between female and male literacy rates) was 19.36%.

See also – List of Jharkhand districts ranked by literacy rate

Literacy in CD Blocks of
Ramgarh district
Patratu – 75.00%
Mandu – 72.68%
Ramgarh – 70.96%
Dulmi – 67.62%
Chitarpur – 78.60%
Gola – 65.35%
Source: 2011 Census: CD Block Wise
Primary Census Abstract Data

== Language and religion ==
Religions in Mandu CD block (2011)
| Religion | Percent |
| Hinduism | 81.97% |
| Islam | 13.57% |
| Sarna | 3.47% |
| Christianity | 0.72% |
| Other or not stated | 0.27% |

Hindi is the official language in Jharkhand and Urdu has been declared as an additional official language.

Languages of Mandu CD block (2011)
1. Khortha (57.4%)
2. Hindi (16.1%)
3. Santali (7.18%)
4. Urdu (6.89%)
5. Bhojpuri (3.19%)
6. Magahi (2.81%)
7. Nagpuri (1.57%)
8. Bengali (1.42%)
9. Others (3.47%)

At the time of the 2011 census, 57.41% of the population spoke Khortha, 16.06% Hindi, 7.18% Santali, 6.89% Urdu, 3.19% Bhojpuri, 2.81% Magahi, 1.57% Nagpuri and 1.42% Bengali as their first language.

== Rural poverty ==
Ramgarh district was carved out of Hazaribagh district in 2007. In 2004–2005, 40-50% of the population of Hazaribagh district were in the BPL category, being in the same category as Godda, Giridih and Koderma districts. Rural poverty in Jharkhand declined from 66% in 1993–94 to 46% in 2004–05. In 2011, it has come down to 39.1%.

== Economy ==
=== Livelihood ===
Livelihood
in Mandu CD block
1. Cultivators (22.4%)
2. Agricultural labourers (11.7%)
3. Household industries (1.78%)
4. Other Workers (64.1%)

In the Mandu CD block in 2011, among the class of total workers, cultivators numbered 17,177 and formed 22.43%, agricultural labourers numbered 8,969 and formed 11.71%, household industry workers numbered 1,366 and formed 1.78% and other workers numbered 49,074 and formed 64.08%. Total workers numbered 76,586 and formed 30.27% of the total population, and non-workers numbered 176,446 and formed 69.73% of the population.

=== Infrastructure ===
There are 70 inhabited villages in the Mandu CD block. In 2011, 62 villages had power supply. 8 villages had tap water (treated/ untreated), 70 villages had well water (covered/ uncovered), 66 villages had hand pumps, and all villages had drinking water facility. 9 villages had post offices, 7 villages had sub post offices, 9 villages had telephones (land lines), 31 villages had mobile phone coverage. 70 villages had pucca (paved) village roads, 22 villages had bus service (public/ private), 9 villages had autos/ modified autos, 18 villages had taxi/vans and 28 villages had tractors. 8 villages had bank branches, 2 villages had agricultural credit societies, 4 villages had cinema/ video halls, 1 village had public library and public reading rooms. 23 villages had public distribution system, 11 villages had weekly haat (market) and 35 villages had assembly polling stations.

=== Coal mining ===
The projects of the Kuju Area of Central Coalfields are: Saruberia underground, Saruberia opencast, Ara open cast, Kuju underground, Topa underground, Topa open cast, Pindra underground, Pindra open cast, Pundi open cast, Karma opencast. The area office is at Hesagarha, Kuju 825316.

The projects of the Hazaribagh Area of Central Coalfields are: Parej East Open Cast, Kedla underground, Kedla opencast, Tapin opencast, Jharkhand opencast, Kedla Washery and Regional R/Workshop. The area office is at Charhi, PO Charhi 825336.

Tata Steel owns and operates the West Bokaro colliery and Ghatotand Washery.

== Transport ==
The Koderma–Hazaribagh–Barkakana–Ranchi line passes through this block and there are stations at Kuju and Mandu.

== Education ==
Mandu CD block had 25 villages with pre-primary schools, 65 villages with primary schools, 32 villages with middle schools, 16 villages with secondary schools, 8 villages with senior secondary schools.
.*Senior secondary schools are also known as Inter colleges in Jharkhand

== Healthcare ==
Mandu CD block had 3 villages with primary health centres, 15 villages with primary health subcentres, 5 villages with maternity and child welfare centres, 3 villages with allopathic hospitals, 1 village with dispensary, x village with veterinary hospital, 1 village with family welfare centre, 8 villages with medicine shops.
.*Private medical practitioners, alternative medicine etc. not included
