= Gola (community development block) =

- Community development block
- Location in Jharkhand Gola (India)
- Coordinates: 23.5372°N 85.7171°E
- Country: India
- State: Jharkhand
- District: Ramgarh

Government
  - Type: Federal democracy

Area
  - Total: 335.81 km^{2} (129.66 sq mi)
- Elevation: 373 m (1,224 ft)

Population (2011)
  - Total: 149,810
  - Density: 446.12/km^{2} (1,155.4/sq mi)

Languages
  - Official: Hindi, Urdu
- Time zone: UTC+5:30 (IST)
- PIN: 829110
- Telephone/ STD code: 06522
- Vehicle registration: JH
- Lok Sabha constituency: Hazaribagh
- Vidhan Sabha constituency: Ramgarh
- Website: ramgarh.nic.in

Gola (community development block) is an administrative division in the Ramgarh subdivision of the Ramgarh district in the Indian state of Jharkhand.

== Maoist activities ==
Jharkhand is one of the states affected by Maoist activities. As of 2012, Ramgarh was not among the highly affected districts in the state. According to the Jharkhand Police spokesperson and Inspector General (IG) Saket Singh, as reported on 8 December 2020, "The activities of CPI-Maoist are now confined to small pockets in the state because of our efforts." Civilian fatalities, a key index of security in a region, declined from 20 in 2019, to 8 in 2020, the lowest in this category since 2000, when there were 13 such fatalities. The 28 total fatalities recorded in 2020 are also the lowest overall fatalities recorded in the state in a year since 2000, when they stood at 36.

== Geography ==
Gola is located at 23.5372°N 85.7171°E. It has an average elevation of 373 metres (1227 feet).

A major portion of the district is a part of the Damodar trough on the Chota Nagpur Plateau. The Ranchi Plateau, the largest part of the Chotanagpur Plateau is on the south and the Hazaribagh Plateau is on the north. The Damodar is the principal river of the district. The main tributaries of Damodar in the area are Naikari, Bhairavi/ Bhera and Bokaro. The Subarnarekha flows through the south-eastern part of the district. The Rajrappa falls and Naikari dam are important landmarks.

Gola CD block is bounded by the Gomia, Petarwar and Kasmar CD blocks in the Bokaro district on the north, the Jhalda I CD block in the Purulia district in West Bengal on the east, the Angara and Silli CD blocks in Ranchi district on the south, and the Dulmi and Chitarpur in the west.

Gola CD block has an area of 335.81 km^{2}.Gola police station serves Gola CD block. The headquarters of Gola CD block is located at Gola village.

== Demographics ==
=== Population ===
According to the 2011 Census of India, Gola CD block had a total population of 149,810, all of which were rural. There were 76,765 (51%) males and 73,045 (49%) females. Population in the age range 0–6 years was 21,891. Scheduled Castes numbered 12,112 (8.08%) and Scheduled Tribes numbered 43,517 (29.05%).

=== Literacy ===
According to the 2011 census, the total number of literate persons in the Gola CD block was 83,590 (65.35% of the population over 6 years) out of which males numbered 50,420 (76.93% of the male population over 6 years) and females numbered 33,170 (53.17% of the female population over 6 years). The gender disparity (the difference between female and male literacy rates) was 23.76%.

See also – List of Jharkhand districts ranked by literacy rate

Literacy in CD Blocks of
Ramgarh district
Patratu – 75.00%
Mandu – 72.68%
Ramgarh – 70.96%
Dulmi – 67.62%
Chitarpur – 78.60%
Gola – 65.35%
Source: 2011 Census: CD Block Wise
Primary Census Abstract Data

=== Language and religion ===
Religions in Gola CD block (2011)
Religion	Percent
Hinduism	85.69%
Islam	10.46%
Sarna	3.49%
Other or not stated	0.36%

Hindi is the official language in Jharkhand and Urdu has been declared as an additional official language.

Languages of Gola CD block (2011)
1. Khortha (73.7%)
2. Santali (8.40%)
3. Urdu (6.43%)
4. Kurmali (5.02%)
5. Hindi (4.01%)
6. Bengali (1.92%)
7. Others (0.54%)

At the time of the 2011 census, 73.68% of the population spoke Khortha, 8.40% Santali, 6.43% Urdu, 5.02% Kurmali, 4.01% Hindi and 1.92% Bengali as their first language.

== Rural poverty ==
Ramgarh district was carved out of Hazaribagh district in 2007. In 2004–2005, 40-50% of the population of Hazaribagh district were in the BPL category, being in the same category as Godda, Giridih and Koderma districts. Rural poverty in Jharkhand declined from 66% in 1993–94 to 46% in 2004–05. In 2011, it has come down to 39.1%.

== Economy ==
=== Livelihood ===
Livelihood
in Gola CD block
1. Cultivators (53.0%)
2. Agricultural labourers (28.2%)
3. Household industries (2.50%)
4. Other Workers (16.4%)

In the Gola CD block in 2011, among the class of total workers, cultivators numbered 33,705 and formed 52.96%, agricultural labourers numbered 17,926 and formed 28.17%, household industry workers numbered 1,589 and formed 2.50% and other workers numbered 10,417 and formed 16.37%. Total workers numbered 16,637 and formed 42.48% of the total population, and non-workers numbered 86,173 and formed 57.52% of the population.

=== Infrastructure ===
There are 88 inhabited villages in the Gola CD block. In 2011, 83 villages had power supply. 10 villages had tap water (treated/ untreated), 82 villages had well water (covered/ uncovered), 87 villages had hand pumps, and 1 village did not have drinking water facility. 18 villages had post offices, 10 villages had sub post offices, 7 villages had telephones (land lines), 16 villages had mobile phone coverage. 88 villages had pucca (paved) village roads, 17 villages had bus service (public/ private), 20 villages had autos/ modified autos, 21 villages had taxi/vans and 42 villages had tractors. 9 villages had bank branches, 6 villages had agricultural credit societies, 2 villages had cinema/ video halls, 3 villages had public library and public reading rooms. 46 villages had public distribution system, 18 villages had weekly haat (market) and 43 villages had assembly polling stations.

=== Agriculture ===
The main occupation of the people of Ramgarh district is cultivation. Cultivable area forms about 39% of the total area of the district. Rice, maize, ragi, fruits and vegetables are the main crops of the district.

== Transport ==
National Highway 320 passes through Gola CD block.

The Barkakana-Muri-Chandil line passes through this block. There are stations at Sondimra, Harubera and Gola Road.

== Education ==
Gola CD block had 54 villages with pre-primary schools, 82 villages with primary schools, 43 villages with middle schools, 12 villages with secondary schools, 5 villages with senior secondary schools, 1 village with general degree college.
.*Senior secondary schools are also known as Inter colleges in Jharkhand

== Healthcare ==
Gola CD block had 2 villages with primary health centres, 17 villages with primary health subcentres, 3 villages with maternity and child welfare centres, 4 villages with dispensaries, 4 villages with family welfare centres, 2 villages with medicine shops.
.*Private medical practitioners, alternative medicine etc. not included
