= Hazaribagh Area =

- Location in Jharkhand Hazaribagh Area (India)
- Location: West Bokaro Coalfield; 23.853742°N 85.441232°E
- Company: Central Coalfields Limited
- Website: centralcoalfields.in/cmpny/hstry.php

Hazaribagh Area is one of the operational areas of the Central Coalfields Limited located mainly in the Hazaribagh and Ramgarh districts in the state of Jharkhand, India.

The projects of the Hazaribagh Area are: Parej East Open Cast, Kedla underground, Kedla opencast, Tapin opencast, Jharkhand opencast, Kedla Washery and Regional R/Workshop. The area office is at Charhi, PO Charhi 825336.

== Mining activity ==
Collieries in the CCL Hazaribagh Area (West Bokaro Coalfield)
U: Underground colliery, O: Open Cast colliery, M: Mixed colliery, W: Washery, S: Facility, A: Administrative headquarters, CT: census town
Owing to space constraints in the small map, the actual locations in a larger map may vary slightly

=== Mines and projects ===
The Parej East project could not be started because of non-availability of environmental clearance.

Kedla geological coal block lies in West Bokaro Coalfield, in the Mandu (community development block) in the Ramgarh district. It lies between Hazaribagh Plateau and the Damodar River. The general elevation is 340 metres (1,120 ft). The area is gently undulating and Bokaro River flows along the southern boundary. The Kedla, Jharkhand and Rauta collieries were taken over from the Raja of Ramgarh in 1973. The total mineable reserves in D, C and B sectors have been estimated at 41.72 million tonnes of coal. Kedla open cast project has an approved production capacity of 1.0 million tonnes per year. With extraction of coal from the Kedla OCP in the intervening years, as of 2012, the balance mineable reserve was 23.60 million tonnes and an estimated life of 32 years.

Kedla underground project has an annual production target of 0.18 million tonnes (peak 0.22 million tonnes per year). As of 2018, it had an expected life of 18 years.

Jharkhand opencast project was started in 1975–76 with an initial production of 0.10 million tonnes per year. The mineable reserves were estimated at 21.5 million tonnes. The mine secured environment clearance in 1995 for normative capacity of 1.0 million tonnes per year. The proposed capacity of the project after expansion is 2.00 million tonnes per year (normative capacity) and 2.80 million tonnes per year (peak capacity).

Cities, towns and locations in Hazaribagh district in North Chotanagpur Division
Some census towns and locations around Hazaribagh city have been shown in the Hazaribagh City map
M: municipality, CT: census town, R: rural/ urban centre, T: tourist centre, D: dam, HS: hot spring
Owing to space constraints in the small map, the actual locations in a larger map may vary slightly

Tapin colliery is a taken over mine. At the time of nationalisation it was producing 0.20 million tonnes per annum. In 1975 it was producing 0.60 million tonnes per year from two OCPs and an underground mine. As of 2012, there was no mining activity in the block. Tapin South Expansion OCP had a proposed capacity of 2.00 million tonnes per annum (normative) and 2.60 million tonnes per annum (peak).

Kedla Coking Coal Washery has a raw coal capacity of 2.6 million tonnes per year. It had obtained environmental clearance in 1993. Coal is being fed into the washery from Kedla UG, Kedla OC and Tapin OC. As of 2013, it has an estimated life of 30 years.

Basantpur Tapin Coking Coal Washery is a proposed 4.0 million tonnes raw coal washery.

The Kotre Basantpur Pachmo OCP is proposed to have an annual capacity of 5 million tonnes per year. It is located across Ramgarh and Bokaro districts in the northern portion of West Bokaro Coalfield. The life of the mine is expected to be 36 years. A portion of this block mentioned as Hurdag coal block has been allotted to Tata Steel.

Note: For Ramgarh district map please see Kuju Area

== Illegal mining activities ==
According to the Report on Prevention of Illegal Coal Mining and Theft, “The main source of illegal mining of coal and theft is abandoned mines. After economic extraction is over, the remaining coal in an abandoned mine is stolen by coal mafias, villagers leading to roof falling, water flooding, poisonous gas leaking, leading to the death of many labourers.”In the Hazaribagh Area of CCL illegal mining activities are taking place in Tapin South 44 & 45 Quarry, Tapin North 42 & 40 Quarry, Jharkhand non-working quarry. Illegal mining also takes place in the fringe areas and outside the leasehold areas of CCL.

== Educational facilities for employees’ children ==
Central Coalfields Limited provides support for reputed institutions/ trusts for setting up 10+2 pattern CBSE schools for children of CCL employees. It provides 109 buses to employees' children to schools and back. Among the schools in the West Bokaro Coalfield that receive financial help or structural support are: DAV Ara, Kuju, DAV Kedla, DAV Taping, DAV Topa.

== Medical facilities ==
In the West Bokaro Coalfield, CCL has the following facilities:

S.C.Taping Regional Hospital at Premnagar, Taping with 20 beds, has 1 general duty medical officer. Among the facilities it has are: x-ray, laboratory. It has 1 ambulance.

JRH Kedla Colliery Hospital at Kedla has 32 beds.

There are central facilities in the Central Hospital, Gandhinagar at Kanke Road, Ranchi with 250 beds and in the Central Hospital, Naisarai at Ramgarh with 150 beds.

There are dispensaries at GM unit, Topa, Saruberia composite and Kuju colliery in the Kuju Area, and GM Unit and Jharkhand in the Hazaribagh Area.
