= Jama Mosque, Ramgarh =

Mosque in Chitarpur, Ramgarh, Jharkhand, India

Jama Mosque
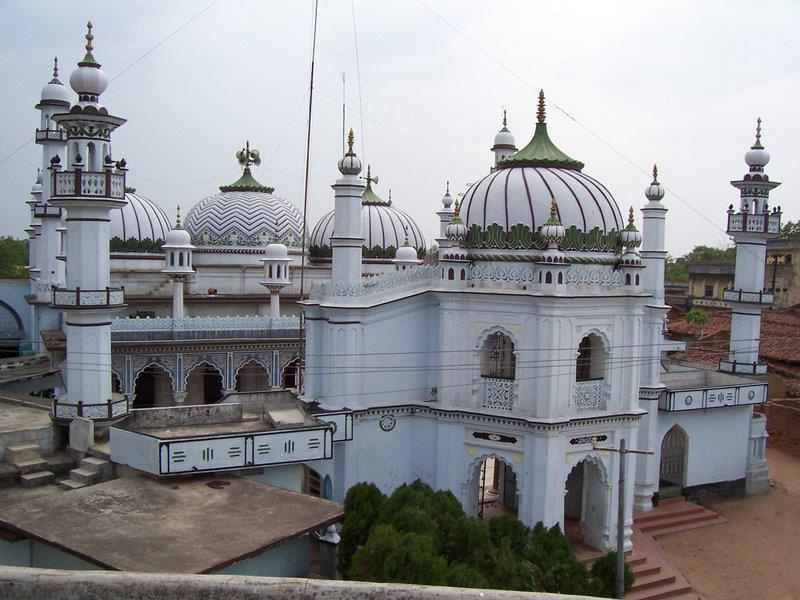
- The mosque in 2009

- Location of the mosque in Jharkhand

Religion
- Affiliation: Islam
- Ecclesiastical or organizational status: Mosque
- Status: Active

Location
- Location: Chitarpur, Ramgarh, Jharkhand
- Country: India
- Interactive map of Jama Mosque
- Coordinates: 23°34′16″N 85°39′07″E

Architecture
- Type: Mosque architecture
- Style: Islamic; Mughal
- Completed: 1670

Specifications
- Capacity: 5,000 worshippers
- Dome: 4
- Minaret: 4

The Jame Mosque, or Jama Masjid, is a Friday mosque located in Chitarpur town in the Ramgarh district in the state of Jharkhand, India. Built in 1670 by Mughal rulers in the Mughal style, it is one of the oldest mosques of the state. The mosque holds daily prayer sessions.

== Gallery ==
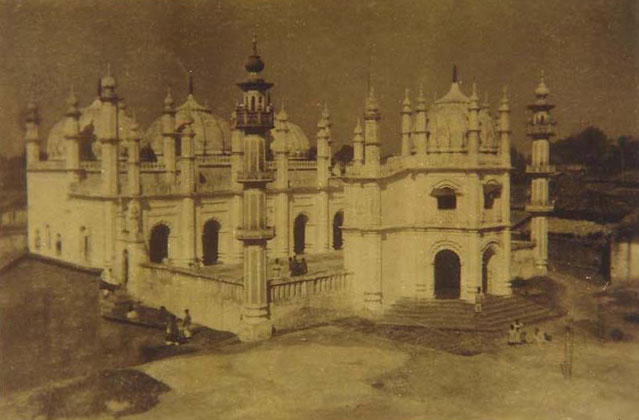
The mosque in the 1980s

== See also ==
- Islam in India
- List of mosques in India
