= Kathara Area =

- Location in Jharkhand Kathara Area (India)
- Location: East Bokaro Coalfield; 23.768403°N 85.892257°E
- Company: Central Coalfields Limited
- Website: centralcoalfields.in/cmpny/hstry.php

Kathara Area is one of the operational areas of the Central Coalfields Limited located mainly in the Bokaro district in the state of Jharkhand, India.

The projects of the Kathara Area are: Kathara open cast, Jarangdih open cast, Jarangdih underground, Sawang open cast/ underground, Govindpur underground, Kathara Washery, Swang Washery. The area office is at Kathara, PO Kathara 829116.

== Mining activity ==
Collieries in the CCL Kathara Area (East Bokaro Coalfield)
U: Underground colliery, O: Open Cast colliery, M: Mixed colliery, W: Washery, S: Facility, A: Administrative headquarters
Owing to space constraints in the small map, the actual locations in a larger map may vary slightly
Cities, towns and locations in Bokaro district in North Chotanagpur Division
M: municipal town, CT: census town, R: rural/ urban centre, F: Factory, A: Coal Mining Area
Abbreviation used: TPS – Thermal Power Station
Owing to space constraints in the small map, the actual locations in a larger map may vary slightly

=== Mines and projects ===
Kathara colliery is a running mine, started in 1944 by Anderson Wright and Company. Kathara opencast project has been cleared in 2014 for 1.9 million tonnes per year. Kathara opencast expansion project was cleared in 2014 for 0.9 million tonnes per year (normative} and 1.9 million tonnes per year (peak).

New Kathara Coking Coal Washery is a proposed project with linkages with Govindpur Ph II, Jagrandih OCP and Kathara Colliery. With an annual capacity of 3.0 million tonnes per year, it is located in the premises of the existing Kathara washery.

Jarangdih Open Cast Project has been closed in 2020 because of non-availability of environmental clearance.

== Educational facilities for employees’ children ==
Central Coalfields Limited provides support for reputed institutions/ trusts for setting up 10+2 pattern CBSE schools for children of CCL employees. It provides 109 buses to employees’ children to schools and back. Among the schools in the East Bokaro Coalfield that receive financial help or structural support are: DAV Dhori, DAV Swang, DAV Kathara.

== Medical facilities ==
In the East Bokaro Coalfield, CCL has the following facilities:

Central Hospital Dhori at Dhori with 50 beds has 7 general duty medical officers and 3 specialists. Among the facilities it has are audiometer, spirometer, I.C.U. It has 4 ambulances.

Regional Hospital at Kargali with 60 beds has 3 general duty medical officers and 3 specialists. Among the facilities it has are surgical and eye equipment. It has 2 ambulances.

Bokaro Colliery Hospital at Bermo with 48 beds has 2 general duty medical officers. It has facilities for routine tests.

Kathara Hospital at Kathara with 35 beds has 4 general duty medical officers. Among the facilities it has are X‐ray, ECG, auto analyser. It has 2 ambulances.

Swang Hospital at Swang functions with 11 beds.

Jarangdih Hospital at Jaragdih functions with 11 beds.

There are central facilities in the Central Hospital, Gandhinagar at Kanke Road, Ranchi with 250 beds and in the Central Hospital, Naisarai at Ramgarh with 150 beds.

There are dispensaries at Gobindpur in the Kathara Area, Karo I/ Jawahar Nagar, AAK OCP/ KMP in the Bokaro & Kargali Area and Central Colony and Kalyani in the Dhori Area.
