= Dulmi (community development block) =

- Community development block
- Location in Jharkhand Dulmi (India)
- Coordinates: 23°31′47″N 85°36′9″E
- Country: India
- State: Jharkhand
- District: Ramgarh

Government
  - Type: Federal democracy

Area
  - Total: 107.93 km^{2} (41.67 sq mi)
- Elevation: 352 m (1,155 ft)

Population (2011)
  - Total: 66,238
  - Density: 613.71/km^{2} (1,589.5/sq mi)

Languages
  - Official: Hindi, Urdu
- Time zone: UTC+5:30 (IST)
- PIN: 825101
- Telephone/ STD code: 06553
- Vehicle registration: JH
- Lok Sabha constituency: Hazaribagh
- Vidhan Sabha constituency: Ramgarh
- Website: ramgarh.nic.in

Dulmi (community development block) is an administrative division in the Ramgarh subdivision of the Ramgarh district in the Indian state of Jharkhand.

== Maoist activities ==
Jharkhand is one of the states affected by Maoist activities. As of 2012, Ramgarh was not among the highly affected districts in the state. According to the Jharkhand Police spokesperson and Inspector General (IG) Saket Singh, as reported on 8 December 2020, "The activities of CPI-Maoist are now confined to small pockets in the state because of our efforts." Civilian fatalities, a key index of security in a region, declined from 20 in 2019, to 8 in 2020, the lowest in this category since 2000, when there were 13 such fatalities. The 28 total fatalities recorded in 2020 are also the lowest overall fatalities recorded in the state in a year since 2000, when they stood at 36.

== Geography ==
Dulmi is located at 23°31′47″N 85°36′9″E.

A major portion of the district is a part of the Damodar trough on the Chota Nagpur Plateau. The Ranchi Plateau, the largest part of the Chotanagpur Plateau is on the south and the Hazaribagh Plateau is on the north. The Damodar is the principal river of the district. The main tributaries of Damodar in the area are Naikari, Bhairavi/ Bhera and Bokaro. The Subarnarekha flows through the south-eastern part of the district. The Rajrappa falls and Naikari dam are important landmarks.

Dulmi CD block is bounded by the Chitarpur CD block on the north, the Gola CD block on the east, the Angara CD block in the Ranchi district on the south, and the Ramgarh CD block on the west.

Dulmi CD block has an area of 107.93 km^{2}. The headquarters of Dulmi CD block is located at Dulmi town.

== Demographics ==
=== Population ===
According to the 2011 Census of India, Dulmi CD block had a total population of 66,238, all of which were rural. There were 33,993 (51%) males and 32,245 (49%) females. Population in the age range 0–6 years was 10,029. Scheduled Castes numbered 5,311 (8.02%) and Scheduled Tribes numbered 10,527 (15.89%).

=== Literacy ===
According to the 2011 census, the total number of literate persons in the Dulmi CD block was 38,006 (67.92% of the population over 6 years) out of which males numbered 22,002 (76.29% of the male population over 6 years) and females numbered 15,104 (55.18% of the female population over 6 years). The gender disparity (the difference between female and male literacy rates) was 21.11%.

See also – List of Jharkhand districts ranked by literacy rate

Literacy in CD Blocks of
Ramgarh district
Patratu – 75.00%
Mandu – 72.68%
Ramgarh – 70.96%
Dulmi – 67.62%
Chitarpur – 78.60%
Gola – 65.35%
Source: 2011 Census: CD Block Wise
Primary Census Abstract Data

=== Language and religion ===
Religions in Dulmi CD block (2011)
| Religion | Percent |
| Hinduism | 78.83% |
| Islam | 18.58% |
| Sarna | 2.37% |
| Other or not stated | 0.22% |

Hindi is the official language in Jharkhand and Urdu has been declared as an additional official language.

Languages of Dulmi CD block (2011)
1. Khortha (85.5%)
2. Urdu (11.1%)
3. Hindi (1.64%)
4. Others (1.69%)

At the time of the 2011 census, 85.54% of the population spoke Khortha, 11.13% Urdu and 1.64% Hindi as their first language.

== Rural poverty ==
Ramgarh district was carved out of Hazaribagh district in 2007. In 2004–2005, 40-50% of the population of Hazaribagh district were in the BPL category, being in the same category as Godda, Giridih and Koderma districts. Rural poverty in Jharkhand declined from 66% in 1993–94 to 46% in 2004–05. In 2011, it has come down to 39.1%.

== Economy ==
=== Livelihood ===
Livelihood
in Dulmi CD block
1. Cultivators (53.7%)
2. Agricultural labourers (20.7%)
3. Household industries (2.15%)
4. Other Workers (23.5%)

In the Dulmi CD block in 2011, among the class of total workers, cultivators numbered 13,122 and formed 53.72%, agricultural labourers numbered 5,049 and formed 20.67%, household industry workers numbered 524 and formed 2.15% and other workers numbered 5,732 and formed 72.52%. Total workers numbered 24,427 and formed 36.88% of the total population, and non-workers numbered 41,811 and formed 63.12% of the population.

=== Infrastructure ===
There are 40 inhabited villages in the Dulmi CD block. In 2011, 32 villages had power supply. 2 villages had tap water (treated/ untreated), 39 villages had well water (covered/ uncovered), 33 villages had hand pumps, and 1 village did not have drinking water facility. 10 villages had post offices, 13 villages had sub post offices, 36 villages had mobile phone coverage. 40 villages had pucca (paved) village roads, 14 villages had bus service (public/ private), 19 villages had autos/ modified autos, 21 villages had taxi/vans and 29 villages had tractors. 16 villages had bank branches, 16 villages had agricultural credit societies. 25 villages had public distribution system, 12 villages had weekly haat (market) and 32 villages had assembly polling stations.

=== Agriculture ===
The main occupation of the people of Ramgarh district is cultivation. Cultivable area forms about 39% of the total area of the district. Rice, maize, ragi, fruits and vegetables are the main crops of the district.

== Education ==
Dulmi CD block had 8 villages with pre-primary schools, 39 villages with primary schools, 20 villages with middle schools, 4 villages with secondary schools, 8 villages with senior secondary schools.
.*Senior secondary schools are also known as Inter colleges in Jharkhand

== Healthcare ==
Dulmi CD block had 20 villages with primary health subcentres, 1 village with allopathic hospital, 1 village with medicine shop.
.*Private medical practitioners, alternative medicine etc. not included
