= Chitarpur (community development block) =

- Community development block
- Location in Jharkhand Chitarpur (India)
- Coordinates: 23.5749°N 85.6548°E
- Country: India
- State: Jharkhand
- District: Ramgarh

Government
  - Type: Federal democracy

Area
  - Total: 64.85 km^{2} (25.04 sq mi)
- Elevation: 364 m (1,194 ft)

Population (2011)
  - Total: 70,701
  - Density: 1,090/km^{2} (2,824/sq mi)

Languages
  - Official: Hindi, Urdu
- Time zone: UTC+5:30 (IST)
- PIN: 825101
- Telephone/ STD code: 06553
- Vehicle registration: JH
- Lok Sabha constituency: Hazaribagh
- Vidhan Sabha constituency: Ramgarh
- Website: ramgarh.nic.in

Chitarpur (community development block) is an administrative division in the Ramgarh subdivision of the Ramgarh district in the Indian state of Jharkhand.

== Maoist activities ==
Jharkhand is one of the states affected by Maoist activities. As of 2012, Ramgarh was not among the highly affected districts in the state. According to the Jharkhand Police spokesperson and Inspector General (IG) Saket Singh, as reported on 8 December 2020, "The activities of CPI-Maoist are now confined to small pockets in the state because of our efforts." Civilian fatalities, a key index of security in a region, declined from 20 in 2019, to 8 in 2020, the lowest in this category since 2000, when there were 13 such fatalities. The 28 total fatalities recorded in 2020 are also the lowest overall fatalities recorded in the state in a year since 2000, when they stood at 36.

== Geography ==
Chitarpur is located at 23.5749°N 85.6548°E. It has an average elevation of 364 metres (1167 feet).

A major portion of the district is a part of the Damodar trough on the Chota Nagpur Plateau. The Ranchi Plateau, the largest part of the Chotanagpur Plateau is on the south and the Hazaribagh Plateau is on the north. The Damodar is the principal river of the district. The main tributaries of Damodar in the area are Naikari, Bhairavi/ Bhera and Bokaro. The Subarnarekha flows through the south-eastern part of the district. The Rajrappa falls and Naikari dam are important landmarks.

Chitarpur CD block is bounded by the Gomia CD block in Bokaro district on the north, the Gola on the east, the Dulmi on the south and the Ramgrh CD block on the west.

Chitarpur CD block has an area of 64.85 km^{2}.Rajrappa police station serves Chitarpur CD block. The headquarters of Chitarpur CD block is located at Chitarpur town.

== Demographics ==
=== Population ===
According to the 2011 Census of India, Chitarpur CD block had a total population of 70,701, of which 39,990 were rural and 30,711 were urban. There were 36,737 (52%) males and 33,964 (48%) females. Population in the age range 0–6 years was 10,169. Scheduled Castes numbered 3,794 (5.37%) and Scheduled Tribes numbered 7,150 (10.11%).

Sewai and Chitarpur are census towns in the Chitarpur CD block.

=== Literacy ===
According to the 2011 census, the total number of literate persons in the Chitarpur CD block was 47,576 (78.60% of the population over 6 years) out of which males numbered 27,352 (87.09% of the male population over 6 years) and females numbered 20,224 (69.43% of the female population over 6 years). The gender disparity (the difference between female and male literacy rates) was 17.66%.

See also – List of Jharkhand districts ranked by literacy rate

Literacy in CD Blocks of
Ramgarh district
Patratu – 75.00%
Mandu – 72.68%
Ramgarh – 70.96%
Dulmi – 67.62%
Chitarpur – 78.60%
Gola – 65.35%
Source: 2011 Census: CD Block Wise
Primary Census Abstract Data

=== Language and religion ===
Religions in Chitarpur CD block (2011)
Religion	Percent
Hinduism	72.82%
Islam	26.55%
Other or not stated	0.63%

Hindi is the official language in Jharkhand and Urdu has been declared as an additional official language.

Languages of Chitarpur CD block (2011)
1. Khortha (62.4%)
2. Urdu (20.2%)
3. Hindi (11.2%)
4. Santali (2.16%)
5. Bengali (1.35%)
6. Bhojpuri (1.34%)
7. Others (1.32%)

At the time of the 2011 census, 62.38% of the population spoke Khortha, 20.22% Urdu, 11.23% Hindi, 2.16% Santali, 1.35% Bengali and 1.34% Bhojpuri as their first language.

== Rural poverty ==
Ramgarh district was carved out of Hazaribagh district in 2007. In 2004–2005, 40-50% of the population of Hazaribagh district were in the BPL category, being in the same category as Godda, Giridih and Koderma districts. Rural poverty in Jharkhand declined from 66% in 1993–94 to 46% in 2004–05. In 2011, it has come down to 39.1%.

== Economy ==
=== Livelihood ===
Livelihood
in Chitarpur CD block
1. Cultivators (29.8%)
2. Agricultural labourers (12.1%)
3. Household industries (4.68%)
4. Other Workers (53.4%)

In the Chitarpur CD block in 2011, among the class of total workers, cultivators numbered 5,875 and formed 29.83%, agricultural labourers numbered 2,379 and formed 12.08%, household industry workers numbered 921 and formed 4.68% and other workers numbered 10,518 and formed 53.41%. Total workers numbered 19,693 and formed 27.85% of the total population, and non-workers numbered 51,008 and formed 72.15% of the population.

=== Infrastructure ===
There are 20 inhabited villages in the Chitarpur CD block. In 2011, 17 villages had power supply. 4 villages had tap water (treated/ untreated), 19 villages had well water (covered/ uncovered), 19 villages had hand pumps, and 1 village did not have drinking water facility. 3 villages had post offices, 3 villages had sub post offices, 2 villages had telephones (land lines), 13 villages had mobile phone coverage. 20 villages had pucca (paved) village roads, 6 villages had bus service (public/ private), 3 villages had autos/ modified autos, 9 villages had taxi/vans and 8 villages had tractors. 2 villages had bank branches, 1 village had agricultural credit society, 1 village had cinema/ video hall. 6 villages had public distribution system, 2 villages had weekly haat (market) and 9 villages had assembly polling stations.

=== Coal mining ===
The projects of the Rajrappa Area are: Rajrappa OCP and Rajrappa Washery. The area office is at Rajrappa 829101.

== Transport ==
The Barkakana-Muri-Chandil line passes through this block. There are stations at Barkipona and Mael.

== Education ==
Chitarpur CD block had 9 villages with pre-primary schools, 15 villages with primary schools, 8 villages with middle schools, 4 villages with secondary schools, 2 villages with senior secondary schools, 1 village with general degree college.
.*Senior secondary schools are also known as Inter colleges in Jharkhand

== Healthcare ==
Chitarpur CD block had 1 village with primary health centre, 5 villages with primary health subcentres.
.*Private medical practitioners, alternative medicine etc. not included
