= Rajrappa =

Rajrappa Falls
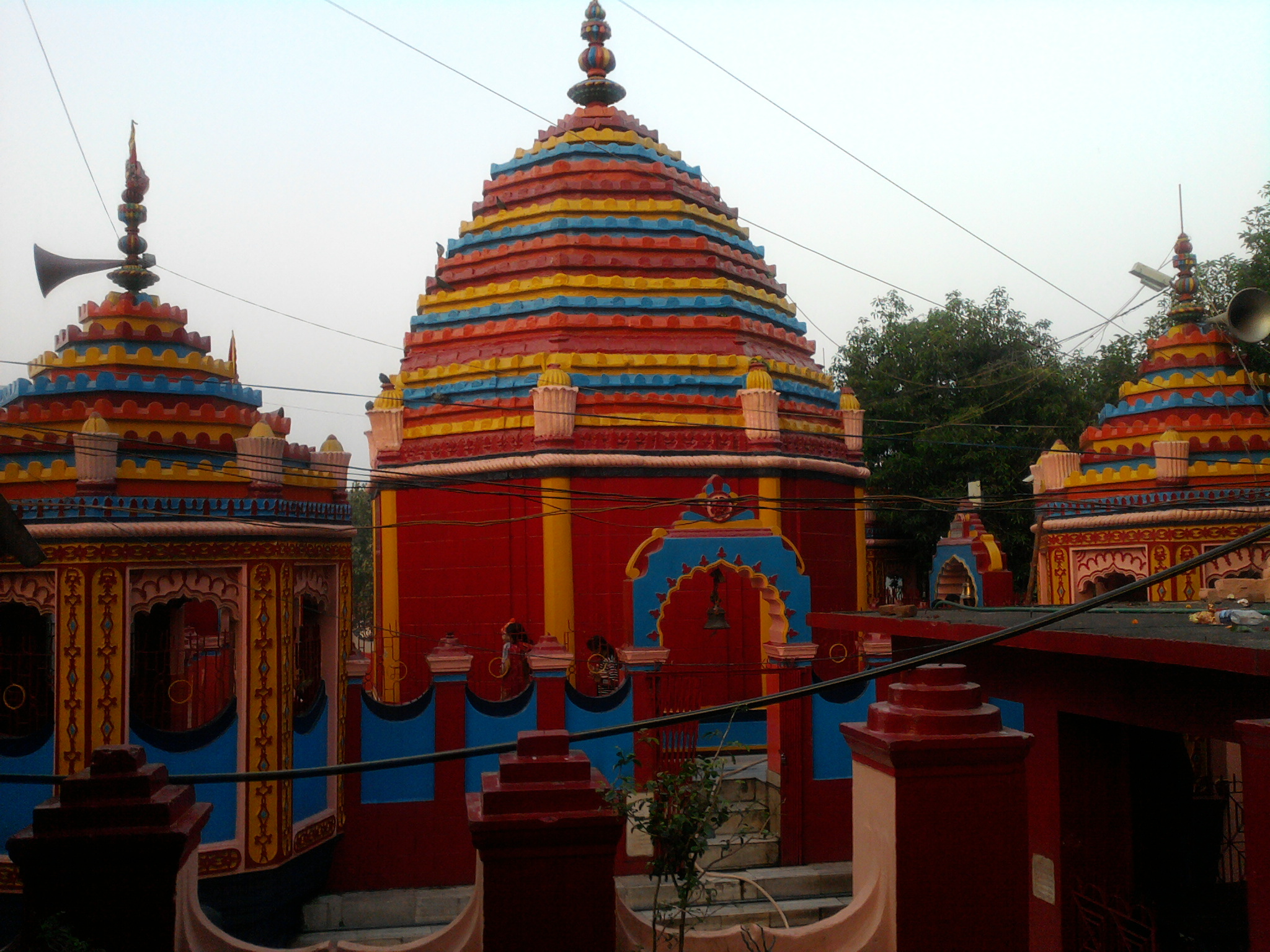
- Maa Chhinnamasta temple

- Location within Jharkhand
- Location: Ramgarh district, Jharkhand, India
- Coordinates: 23°37′55″N 85°42′40″E
- Elevation: 346 metres (1,135 ft)
- Total height: 9.1 metres (30 ft)
- Watercourse: Bhairavi River

Rajrappa is a waterfall and a pilgrimage centre in the Chitarpur CD block in the Ramgarh subdivision of the Ramgarh district in the Indian state of Jharkhand.

== Geography ==
Cities, towns and locations in Ramgarh district in North Chotanagpur Division
M: municipality, CT: census town, R: rural/ urban centre, T: tourist centre, P: power plant
Abbreviation used- TPP: thermal power project
Owing to space constraints in the small map, the actual locations in a larger map may vary slightly

=== Location ===
Rajrappa is located at 23°37′55″N 85°42′40″E.

Rajrappa stands at the confluence of the Damodar and Bhairavi (locally called Bhera) rivers.

Rajrappa is located off NH 23 connecting Ramgarh and Chas. It is 20 kilometres (12 mi) from Ramgarh,65 kilometres (40 mi) from Hazaribagh, 70 kilometres (43 mi) from Ranchi and 68 kilometres (42 mi) from Bokaro Steel City.

Note: The map alongside presents some of the notable locations in the district. All places marked in the map are linked in the larger full screen map.

=== Waterfalls ===
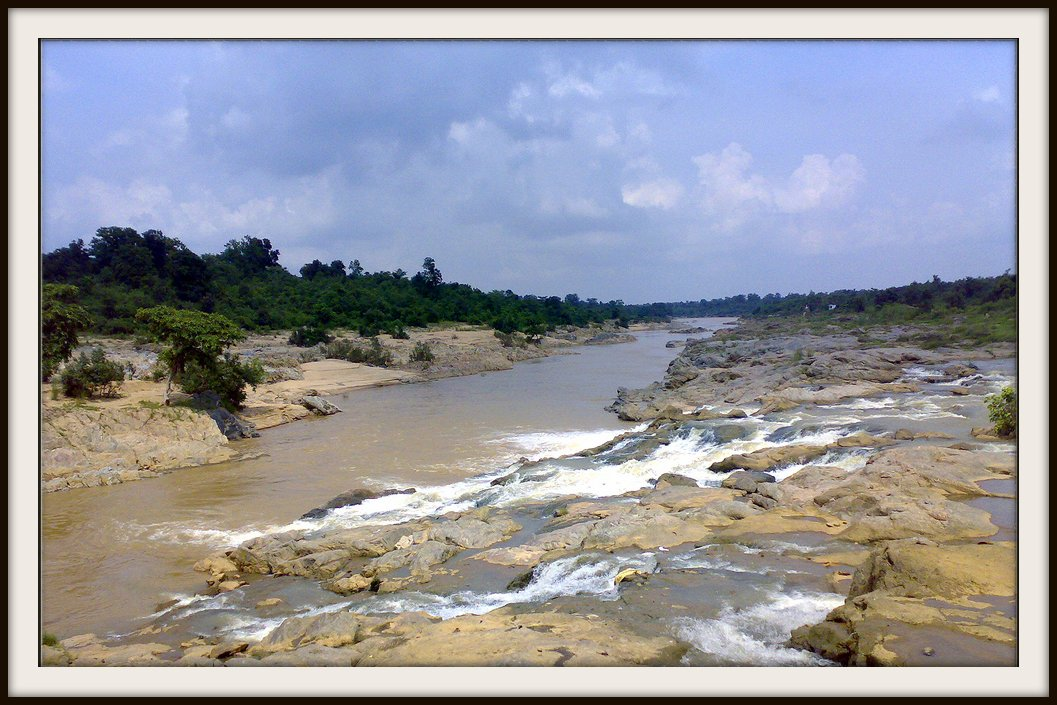
A view of Bhera river at its confluence with river Damodar

The Bhera or Bhairavi joins the Damodar, falling from a height of 9.1 metres (30 ft).

=== Geographical significance ===
Rajrappa Falls has tremendous geographical significance. The Damodar valley at Rajrappa is a typical example of polycyclic valley or topographic discordance which is characterized by two storey valley. The Damodar developed its broad and flat valley of senile stage before the onset of Tertiary upliftment. The river was rejuvenated due to upliftment of landmass during the Paleogene and Neogene Periods (66 million to 1.8 million years ago) by the side effects of the Himalayan orogeny and thus the Damodar excavated its new deep and narrow valley of youthful stage within its broad and flat valley of senile stage. The Bhera river coming from over the Ranchi plateau makes a waterfall while joining the Damodar and thus presents an example of a hanging valley. The Damodar gorge near Rajrappa is a typical example of incised meander.

== Pilgrimage centre ==
Rajrappa is a Hindu pilgrimage centre attracting an estimated 2,500-3,000 persons daily. The main attraction of the Chhinnamasta (also known as Chinnamastika) temple located here is the headless deity of goddess Chinnamasta which stands on the body of Kamdev and Rati in the lotus bed. The Chhinnamasta temple is very popular for its Tantrik style of architectural design. The temple is very old but has that essence of enchantment. Apart from the main temple, there are ten temples of various gods and goddesses such as the Sun God and Lord Shiva. Animal sacrifice is still practised in the temple. The sacrifice is offered on Tuesdays and Saturdays and during Kali puja.

Rajrappa also is a pilgrim centre for the Santals and other tribals who come for immersion of the ashes of their loved ones in the Damodar. They come mostly during the month of December, in groups known as yatri. As per their mythology it is their final resting place. In their folk songs Rajrappa is referred to as "Thel Kopi Ghat" (Water Ghat) and they use oil after bathing. They come in significant numbers from the southern parts of Jharkhand state such as East and West Singhbhum and Saraikela districts.

== Civic administration ==
=== Police station ===
Rajrappa police station serves Chitarpur CD block.

== Economy ==
=== Coal mining ===
Collieries in the CCL Ramgarh Coalfield
U: Underground colliery, O: Open Cast colliery, M: Mixed colliery, W: Washery, S: Facility, A: Administrative headquarters, CT: census town, H: historical, religious, tourist centre
Owing to space constraints in the small map, the actual locations in a larger map may vary slightly

Rajrappa Area of Central Coalfields Limited (CCL), a subsidiary of Coal India Limited, is located in Ramgarh Coalfield. It is one of the biggest coal-fields in this region. It is widely known as the Rajrappa Project, which consist of the main quarry (a huge open cast mine), offices, colonies, recreation facilities, shopping complexes, a police out-post and public utility buildings. It is a complete township in itself.

== Education ==
- DAV Public School Rajrappa
- Shishu Vidya Mandir (SVM) Rajrappa
- Government School, Rajrappa

== See also ==
- List of waterfalls
- List of waterfalls in India
- List of waterfalls in India by height
