= South Karanpura Coalfield =

Coal field in Jharkhand, India

- Location in Jharkhand
- Location: Jharkhand, India; 23°38′17″N 85°18′22″E
- Company: Central Coalfields Limited
- Website: http://ccl.gov.in/
- Acquired: 1975

South Karanpura Coalfield is located in Ramgarh district in the Indian state of Jharkhand.

== Overview ==
In 1917, L.S.S.O’Malley described the coalfields in the upper reaches of the Damodar as follows: "Near the western boundary of Jharia field is that of Bokaro, covering 220 square miles (570 km^{2}), with an estimated content of 1,500 million tons; close by… is the Ramgarh field (40 square miles), in which, however, coal is believed to be of inferior quality. A still larger field in the same district is that called Karanpura, which extends over" 544 square miles (1,410 km^{2}) "and has an estimated capacity of 9,000 million tons."

== The Coalfield ==
The South Karanpura coalfield forms an elongated strip along the Chingara fault. Barkakana railway junction is situated at the south-east edge of the field. There are two coal beds:the upper one is 50 feet (15 m) thick and the lower one 38 feet (12 m) thick, separated by sandstone, shales and shaly coal, mixed coal and shale.

South Karnpura Coalfield covers an area of 195 square kilometres (75 sq mi) and has total coal reserves of 5,757.85 million tonnes.

Collieries in CCL Barka Sayal Area (South Karanpura Coalfield)
U: Underground Colliery, O: Open Cast Colliery, A: Administrative headquarters, CT: census town
Owing to space constraints in the small map, the actual locations in a larger map may vary slightly
Collieries in the CCL Argada Area (South Karanpura Colafield)
U: Underground colliery, O: Open Cast colliery, M: Mixed colliery, W: Washery, S: Facility, A: Administrative headquarters, CT: census town, H: historical, religious, tourist centre
Owing to space constraints in the small map, the actual locations in a larger map may vary slightly

=== Reserves ===
Geological reserves in the South Karanpura Coalfield in million tonnes as on 1/4/2010:

Type of Coal	Proved	Indicated	Inferred (exploration)	Total
Medium coking coal		513.40	296.23	809.63
Non-coking coal	2620.41	1507.42	1212.65	5340.48
Total	2620.41	2020.82	1508.88	6510.11

=== Projects ===
CCL Operational Area	Projects
Barka Sayal Area	Bhurkunda underground, Central Saunda underground, Saunda D underground, Saunda underground, Sayal D underground, Urimari underground, North Urimari/ Birsa opencast, Bhurkunda opencast. The area office is at Sayal, PO Saunda.
Argada Area	Gidi A Open Cast, Gidi C opencast, Religara opencast/ underground, Sirka opencast, Sirka underground, Argada underground, Giddi Washery. The area office is at Sirka, PO Argada 829101.
Non-CCL mines	Jharkhand State Mineral Development Corporation: Patratu

== Transport ==
In 1927, Bengal Nagpur Railway opened the 72-mile (116 km) Barkakana-Muri-Chandil line to traffic. In the same year the Central India Coalfields Railway opened the Gomoh-Barkakana line. It was extended to Daltonganj in 1929. Later these lines were amalgamated with East India Railway.

The Koderma–Hazaribagh–Barkakana–Ranchi line became functional between Koderma and Barkakana in 2015 and 2016.
