= Ramgarh Coalfield =

Coalfield in India

- Location in Jharkhand
- Location: Jharkhand, India; 23°35′53″N 85°40′34″E
- Company: Central Coalfields Limited
- Website: http://ccl.gov.in/
- Acquired: 1975

Ramgarh Coalfield are located in Ramgarh district in the Indian state of Jharkhand.

== Overview ==
In 1917, L.S.S.O’Malley described the coalfields in the upper reaches of the Damodar as follows: “Near the western boundary of Jharia field is that of Bokaro, covering 220 square miles (570 km^{2}), with an estimated content of 1,500 million tons; close by is the Ramgarh field of (40 square miles), but the coal is believed to be of inferior quality. A still larger field in the same district is the Karanpura, which extends over 544 square miles (1,410 km^{2}) and has an estimated capacity of 9,000 million tons.”

== The Coalfield ==
Collieries in the CCL Ramgarh Coalfield
U: Underground colliery, O: Open Cast colliery, M: Mixed colliery, W: Washery, S: Facility, A: Administrative headquarters, CT: census town, H: historical, religious, tourist centre
Owing to space constraints in the small map, the actual locations in a larger map may vary slightly

Ramgarh Coalfield covers an area of 98 square kilometres (38 sq mi) and has total coal reserves of 1,059.20 million tonnes.

=== Reserves ===
Geological reserves in the Ramgarh Coalfield in million tonnes as on 1/4/2010:

Type of Coal	Proved	Indicated	Inferred (exploration)	Total
Medium coking coal	267.20	87.40		354.60
Semi-coking coal	171.94	431.55	53.45	656.94
Non-coking coal	7.13	26.20	4.60	37.90
Total	446.27	545.15	58.05	1049.47

== Projects ==
CCL Operational Area	Projects
Rajrappa Area	Rajrappa OCP and Rajrappa Washery. The area office is at Rajrappa 829101.
Kuju Area	Karma opencast.The area office is at Hesagarha, Kuju 825316.
Non-CCL mines	Jharkhand State Mineral Development Corporation: Sugia, Rauta, Burakhap

== Transport ==
In 1927, Bengal Nagpur Railway opened the 72-mile (116 km) Barkakana-Muri-Chandil line to traffic. In the same year the Central India Coalfields Railway opened the Gomoh-Barkakana line. It was extended to Daltonganj in 1929. Later, these lines were amalgamated with East Indian Railway.

== See also ==
Ramgarh district
