= West Bokaro Coalfield =

Coal mine in Jharkhand, India

- Location in Jharkhand
- Location: Jharkhand, India; 23°48′N 85°45′E
- Company: Central Coalfields Limited
- Website: http://ccl.gov.in/
- Acquired: 1975

West Bokaro Coalfield is located mostly in Ramgarh district and partly in Hazaribagh district in the Indian state of Jharkhand.

== Overview ==
In 1917, L.S.S.O’Malley described the coalfields in the upper reaches of the Damodar as follows: "Near the western boundary of Jharia field is that of Bokaro, covering" 220 square miles (570 km^{2}), "with an estimated content of 1,500 million tons; close by… is the Ramgarh field (40 square miles), in which, however, coal is believed to be of inferior quality. A still larger field in the same district is that called Karanpura, which extends over" 544 square miles (1,410 km^{2}) "and has an estimated capacity of 9,000 million tons."

== The Coalfield ==
Collieries in the CCL Hazaribagh Area (West Bokaro Coalfield)
U: Underground colliery, O: Open Cast colliery, M: Mixed colliery, W: Washery, S: Facility, A: Administrative headquarters, CT: census town
Owing to space constraints in the small map, the actual locations in a larger map may vary slightly
Collieries in the CCL Kuju Area (West Bokaro Coalfield)
U: Underground colliery, O: Open Cast colliery, M: Mixed colliery, W: Washery, S: Facility, A: Administrative headquarters, CT: census town
Owing to space constraints in the small map, the actual locations in a larger map may vary slightly

=== Location ===
The Bokaro coalfield lies between 23° 45’ and 23° 50’ North latitude and 85° 30’ and 86° 03’ East longitude. It spreads 65 km from east to west and 10 to 16 km from north to south. Bokaro West and Bokaro East are two subdivisions of the field separated almost in the middle by Lugu Hill (height 960.9 m (3,153 ft)).

Bokaro River passes through the West Bokaro and East Bokaro coalfields.

West Bokaro Coalfield covers an area of 259 square kilometres (100 sq mi) and has total coal reserves of 4,246.30 million tonnes.

Tata Steel owns and operates the open-cast West Bokaro colliery. It has the distinction of commissioning the country's first coal washery in 1951.

=== Reserves ===
Geological reserves in the West Bokaro Coalfield in million tonnes as on 1/4/2010:

Type of Coal	Proved	Indicated	Inferred (exploration)	Total
Medium coking coal	3354.65	1335.01	34.42	4724.08
Non-coking coal	274.38	14.03	0	288.41
Total	3629.03	1349.04	34.42	5012.49

== Projects ==
CCL Operational Area	Projects
Hazaribagh Area	Parej East Open Cast, Kedla underground, Kedla opencast, Tapin opencast, Jharkhand opencast, Kedla Washery and Regional R/Workshop. The area office is at Charhi, PO Charhi 825336.
Kuju Area	Saruberia underground, Saruberia opencast, Ara open cast, Kuju underground, Topa underground, Topa open cast, Pindra underground, Pindra open cast, Pundi open cast.The area office is at Hesagarha, Kuju 825316.
Non-CCL mines	Tata Steel: West Bokaro colliery, Ghatotand Washery

== Transport ==
In 1927, the Central India Coalfields Railway opened the Gomoh-Barkakana line. It was extended to Daltonganj in 1929. Later these lines were amalgamated with East Indian Railway.
