= Central Coalfields =

Subsidiary of Coal India Limited

Central Coalfields Limited
- Company Logo
- Native name: CCL
- Company type: Public Sector Undertaking
- Industry: Mining
- Founded: November 1, 1975; 50 years ago
- Headquarters: Ranchi, Jharkhand, India
- Area served: Worldwide
- Key people: PM Prasad (Chairman & Managing Director)
- Products: Coal
- Net income: ▼₹1,221.28 crore (US$130 million) (2020-21); ▲₹1,847.75 crore (US$200 million) (2019-20); ▲₹1,704.47 crore (US$180 million) (2018-19)
- Owner: Government of India
- Number of employees: 39,222+ (2019)
- Parent: Coal India Limited
- Website: centralcoalfields.in

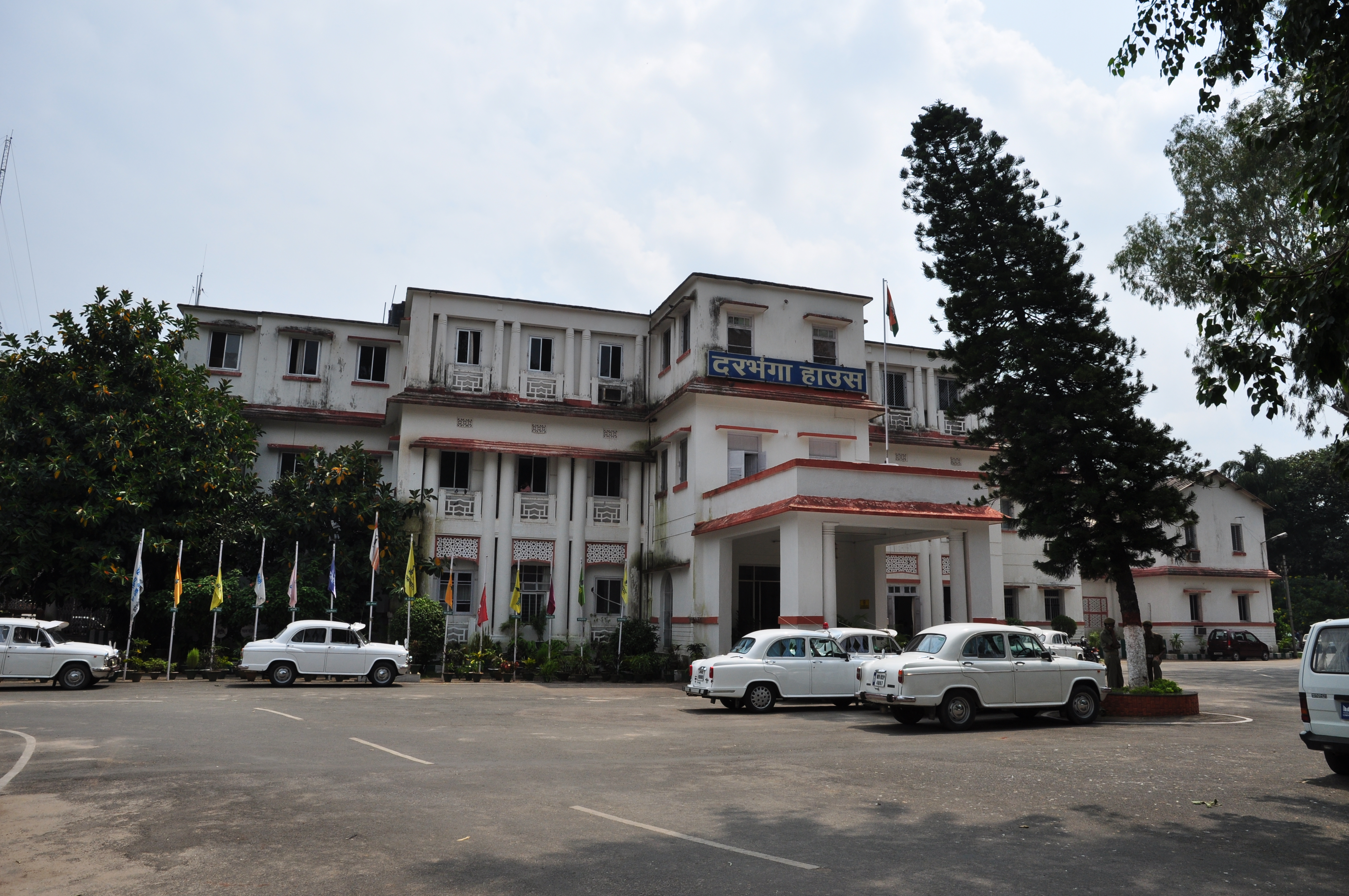
Darbhanga House, Headquarters of Central Coalfields Limited (CCL), Ranchi, Jharkhand

Central Coalfields Limited (CCL) is a subsidiary of Coal India Limited (CIL), an undertaking of the Government of India. CCL was established in 1956 as National Coal Development Corporation Limited and is a Category-I Mini Ratna company since October 2007. CCL manages the nationalised coal mines of the erstwhile Coal Mines Authority, Central Division. CCL is headquartered at Darbhanga House, Ranchi, Jharkhand.

== Infrastructure ==
CCL owns and operates the following:

- 43 operative mines (5 underground & 38 opencast)
- 7 operating coalfields, located in East Bokaro, West Bokaro, North Karanpura, South Karanpura, Ramgarh, Giridih and Hutar.
- 7 washeries
  - 4 operational coking coal washeries at Rajrappa, Kedla, Kathara and Sawang
  - 1 operational non-coking coal washery at Piparwar
  - 2 non-operational non-coking coal washeries at Gidi and Kargali
  - 5 more washeries announced by Coal India on 28 March 2026.
- 1 central workshop at Barkakana
- 2 regional workshops at Giridih and Bhurkunda
- 3 repair workshops at Jarangdih, Tapin North and Dakra

== See also ==
- Coal India
- Mining in India
- Coal mining
- Central government
- Public Sector Undertakings in India
