= Adityapur block =

Adityapur
- Community development block
- Coordinates: 22.8201°N 86.0987°E
- Country: India
- State: Jharkhand
- District: Seraikela Kharsawan

Government
  - Type: Federal democracy

Area
  - Total: 304.51 km^{2} (117.57 sq mi)

Population (2011)
  - Total: 134,717
  - Density: 442.41/km^{2} (1,145.8/sq mi)

Languages
  - Official: Hindi, Urdu
  - Most spoken language: Bengali
- Time zone: UTC+5:30 (IST)
- PIN: 831013
- Telephone/STD code: 0657
- Vehicle registration: JH 22
- Literacy: 71.32%
- Lok Sabha constituency: Singhbhum
- Vidhan Sabha constituency: Seraikella
- Website: seraikela.nic.in

Adityapur block (also referred to as Adityapur Gamharia) is a CD block that forms an administrative division in the Seraikela Sadar subdivision of Seraikela Kharsawan district, in the Indian state of Jharkhand.

== History ==
The British conquered Kolhan in 1837 and consequently formed a new district Singhbhum with headquarters at Chaibasa. In 1854, Singhbhum “became a non-regulation district under the jurisdiction of the Lt. Governor of Bengal”. The Rajas of Porhat/ Singhbhum, Seraikela and Kharswan held sway over their kingdoms under British protection. The native states of Seraikela and Kharsawan acceded to the Indian Union in 1948. Subsequently, Singhbhum district was divided into three subdivisions – Sadar, Dhalbhum and Seraikela. In 1956, along with the reorganisation of the states, three police stations of Manbhum district, namely Patamda, Ichagarh and Chandil were transferred to Singhbhum district. While Patamda was added to Dhalbhum subdivision, Ichagarh and Chandil to Seraikela Sadar subdivision. Seraikela Kharsawan district was carved out of West Singhbhum district in 2001. The district has two subdivisions – Seraikela Sadar and Chandil. The headquarters of the district is at Seraikela town.

== Maoist activities ==
According to a PIB release in 2018, Seraikela Kharswan was not included in the list of the thirty districts most affected by Left wing extremism in the country. The list includes thirteen districts of Jharkhand.

Jharkhand Police has mentioned “Nimdih, Chandil, Chowka, Ichagarh, Tiruldih, Kharsawan and Kuchai” police station areas of Seraikela Kharsawan district as Naxalite affected.

Hemant Soren, Chief Minister of Jharkhand, has claimed, in September 2021, that as a result of the effective action against left wing extremism, the “presence of hardcore Maoists has been limited to mainly four regions, namely Parasnath Pahar, Budha Pahar, Tri-junction of Seraikela-Khunti-Chaibasa district in Kolhan division and some of the areas along the Bihar border”.

== Geography ==
Chota Gamharia, a census town in Adityapur CD block, is located at 22.8201°N 86.0987°E.

The old and undivided Singhbhum district, of which the present Seraikela Kharsawan district was a part, has been described as “part of the southern fringe of the Chotanagpur plateau and is a hilly upland tract. Hills are alternating with valleys, steep mountains, deep forests on the mountain slopes, and, in the river basins, some stretches of comparatively level or undulating country.”

It has an elevation range of 178–209 metres (584–686 ft). Subarnarekha and Kharkai are important rivers in the district.Chandil Dam has been built across the Subarnarekha, after Karkari River joins it.

Adityapur block is bounded by the Chandil CD block on the north, the Golmuri-cum-Jugsalai in the East Singhbhum district on the east, the Gobindpur CD block on the south, and the Seraikela CD block on the west.

Adityapur CD block has an area of 304.51 km^{2}.Adityapur and Gamharia police stations serve Adityapur CD block. The headquarters of Adityapur CD block is located at Adityapur town.

== Demographics ==
=== Population ===
According to the 2011 Census of India, Adityapur CD block had a total population of 134,717, of which 119,055 were rural and 15,662 were urban. There were 69,267 (51%) males and 65,450 (49%) females. The population in the age range 0–6 years was 19,388. Scheduled Castes numbered 8,677 (6.44%) and Scheduled Tribes numbered 40,317 (29.93%).

Census towns in Adityapur CD block are (2011 population figure in brackets): Kandra (8,157) and Chota Gamahria (7,505).

=== Literacy ===
According to the 2011 census, the total number of literate persons in Adityapur CD block was 82,255 (71.32% of the population over 6 years) out of which males numbered 48,630 (82.01% of the male population over 6 years) and females numbered 33,625 (60.01% of the female population over 6 years). The gender disparity (the difference between female and male literacy rates) was 22.00%.

As of 2011 census, literacy in Seraikela Kharsawan district was 68.85%. Literacy in Jharkhand was 67.63% in 2011. Literacy in India in 2011 was 74.04%.

See also – List of Jharkhand districts ranked by literacy rate

Literacy in CD Blocks of
Seraikela Kharsawan district
Seraikela Sadar subdivision
Kuchai – 52.97%
Kharsawan – 65.34%
Adityapur – 71.32%
Seraikela – 64.61%
Gobindpur – 63.19%
Chandil subdivision
Chandil – 66.74%
Ichagar – 61.02%
Kukru – 62.54%
Nimdih – 64.22%
Source: 2011 Census: CD block Wise
Primary Census Abstract Data

=== Language and religion ===
Languages in Adityapur CD block (2011)
1. Bengali (40.7%)
2. Hindi (16.2%)
3. Santali (10.8%)
4. Bhojpuri (8.74%)
5. Odia (7.24%)
6. Ho (5.03%)
7. Maithili (3.45%)
8. Magahi (2.90%)
9. Kurmali (1.07%)
10. Others (3.76%)

According to the Population by Mother Tongue 2011 data, in the Adityapur subdistrict (including Adityapur statutory town), Bengali was the mother-tongue of 125,851 persons forming 40.72% of the population, followed by (number of persons and percentage of population in brackets) Hindi (90,052 / 29.14%), Santali (36,677/ 11.87%), Odiya (22,391/ 7.24), Ho (15,558/ 5.03), Maithili(10,655/ 3.45%),Urdu (1,603/0.52%) Mundari (1,236 / 0.40%), Punjabi, (1,187/ 0.38%), Kurukh (531/ 0.17%) and persons with other languages as mother-tongue (3,331/ 1.08%). ‘Other languages’ included 213 persons having Gujarati, 430 persons having Nepali, 230 persons having Bhumij, 330 persons having Munda as mother-tongue. Persons with Hindi as their mother-tongue included 27,004 persons having Bhojpuri, 8,997 persons having Magadhi/Magahi, 247 persons having Chhattisgarhi, 258 persons having Panchpargania, 461 persons having Marwari language, 342 persons having Rajasthani language as mother-tongue.

Note: An attempt has been made to include all language groups each with at least 500 persons as their mother-tongue and only those groups with less than 500 persons as their mother-tongue are included in the “other languages” category. Comparatively smaller language groups with 200+ persons as their mother-tongue are mentioned in the text. Many languages have sub-groups. Those who are interested can see the reference for more details.

Hindi is the official language in Jharkhand and Urdu has been declared as an additional official language.

Religion in Adityapur CD block (2011)
Hinduism	82.31%
Sarna	13.43%
Islam	3.02%
Christianity	0.62%
Other or not stated	0.62%

According to the Population by Religious Communities 2011 data, in the Adityapur subdistrict (including Adityapur statutory town), Hindus numbered 254,387 and formed 82.31% of the population, followed by (number of persons and percentage of population in brackets) Muslims (9,320/ 3.02%), Other religious communities (42,558/ 13.77), Christians (1,906/ 0.62%), and persons who did not state their religion (901/ 0.29%).

In Seraikela Kharsawan district, Scheduled Tribes numbered 255,626 and formed 24.00% of the total population. The larger groups within the scheduled tribes, with percentage of the ST population, were Santals 50.80%, Ho 34.87%, Mundas, Patars 17.60% and Oraons, Bhangar Oraons 4.12%.

== Economy ==
=== Overview ===
70-80% of the population of Seraikela Kharsawan district were in the BPL category in 2004–2005. In 2011–12, the proportion of BPL population in Seraikela Kharsawan district came down to 33.6%. According to a study in 2013 (modified in 2019), "the incidence of poverty in Jharkhand is estimated at 46%, but 60% of the scheduled castes and scheduled tribes are still below poverty line.”

=== Livelihood ===
Livelihood
in Adityapur CD block
1. Cultivators (9.96%)
2. Agricultural labourers (6.89%)
3. Household industries (1.96%)
4. Other Workers (81.2%)

In Adityapur CD block in 2011, amongst the class of total workers, cultivators numbered 9,935 and formed 9.96%, agricultural labourers numbered 6,879 and formed 6.89%, household industry workers numbered 1,956 and formed 1.96% and other workers numbered 81,025 and formed 81.19%. Total workers numbered 99,795 and formed 32.29% of the total population, and non-workers numbered 209,277 and formed 67.71% of the population.

=== Infrastructure ===
There are 187 inhabited villages in Adityapur CD block. In 2011, 168 villages had power supply. 20 villages had tap water, 180 villages had well water (covered/ uncovered), 170 villages had hand pumps, and all villages have drinking water facility. 13 villages had post offices, 9 villages had sub post offices, 9 villages had telephone (land line), 98 villages had mobile phone coverage. 185 villages had pucca (paved) village roads, 14 villages had bus service (public/ private), 4 villages had autos/ modified autos, 9 villages had taxi/ vans, 48 villages had tractors. 10 villages had bank branches, 11 villages had agricultural credit societies, 1 village had public library and reading room, 40 villages had availability of newspapers, 66 villages had ration shops, 6 villages had weekly haat, 68 villages had assembly polling stations.

=== Backward Regions Grant Fund ===
Seraikela Kharsawan district is listed as a backward region and receives financial support from the Backward Regions Grant Fund. The fund, created by the Government of India, is ”designed to redress regional imbalances in development”. As of 2012, 272 districts across the country were listed under this scheme. The list includes 21 districts of Jharkhand.

== Transport ==
Tatanagar-Bilaspur line

The Tatanagar-Bilaspur section of the Howrah-Nagpur-Mumbai line passes through Adityapur, Seraikela and Kharsawan CD blocks of Seraikela Kharsawan district. There are stations at Adityapur, Gamharia, Birbans, Sini, Mahali Marup and Rajkharsawan.

The Asansol-Tatanagar-Kharagpur line passes through Adityapur and Chandil CD blocks.

== Education ==
Adityapur CD block had 22 villages with pre-primary schools, 145 villages with primary schools, 65 villages with middle schools, 14 villages with secondary schools, 1 village with senior secondary school, 40 villages with no educational facility.
.*Senior secondary schools are also known as Inter colleges in Jharkhand

Arka Jain University, is a private university at Mohanpur, Gamharia, established in 2011.

MSME Tool Room (Indo Danish Tool Room), Jamshedpur Main Centre, located at Gamharia, offers diploma, certificate and skill development programmes.

XITE (Xavier Institute of Tribal Education) College was established at Gamharia by the Jamshedpur Jesuit Society in 2003.

== Healthcare ==
Adityapur CD block had 1 village with primary health centre, 11 villages with primary health subcentres, 2 villages with maternity and child welfare centres, 3 villages with allopathic hospitals, 1 village with a dispensary, 3 villages with family welfare centres, 42 villages with medicine shops.
.*Private medical practitioners, alternative medicine etc. not included
