= Kharsawan block =

Kharsawan
- Community development block
- Coordinates: 22.7897°N 85.8253°E
- Country: India
- State: Jharkhand
- District: Seraikela Kharsawan

Government
  - Type: Federal democracy

Area
  - Total: 226.52 km^{2} (87.46 sq mi)

Population (2011)
  - Total: 88,642
  - Density: 391.32/km^{2} (1,013.5/sq mi)

Languages
  - Official: Hindi
- Time zone: UTC+5:30 (IST)
- PIN: 831013
- Telephone/STD code: 06583
- Vehicle registration: JH 22
- Literacy: 65.34%
- Lok Sabha constituency: Khunti
- Vidhan Sabha constituency: Kharsawan
- Website: seraikela.nic.in

Kharsawan block is a CD block that forms an administrative division in the Seraikela Sadar subdivision of Seraikela Kharsawan district, in the Indian state of Jharkhand.

== History ==
The British conquered Kolhan in 1837 and consequently formed a new district Singhbhum with headquarters at Chaibasa. In 1854, Singhbhum "became a non-regulation district under the jurisdiction of the Lt. Governor of Bengal". The Rajas of Porhat/ Singhbhum, Seraikela and Kharswan ('Kharsuan' is original name）held sway over their kingdoms under British protection. The native states of Seraikela and Kharsawan acceded to the Indian Union in 1948, and on 1 January 1948 Raja of Seraikela and Raja of Kharsawan willingly merged with Odisha (then 'Orissa'). On 1 January 1948, a political leader Jaipal Singh asked tribal people to congregate at Kharsawan to protest against the merger with Odisha, so that then Bihar government would give them a bigger Jharkhand state. Tribal leader Jaipal Singh Munda himself didn't turn up. Tribals gathered at Kharsawan village market with their traditional weapons on 1 January 1948. Seeing Jaipal Singh Munda nowhere, tribals began to lose their patience. Police warned them. According to BBC report, first an arrow hit the arm of a police and police had to fire. Calling it another 'Jaliyanawala bag' is a misnomer. Now, educated tribal people have begun to understand. On 18 May 1948, both Seraikela and Kharsawan were taken out of Odisha and were merged with Bihar due to a political conspiracy. Jaipal Singh Munda didn't get the Jharkhand state as it was promised to him by then politicians of Bihar, till his death in 1970. Subsequently, it was merged with Singhbhum district was divided into three subdivisions – Sadar, Dhalbhum and Seraikela. In 1956, along with the reorganisation of the states, three police stations of Manbhum district, namely Patamda, Ichagarh and Chandil were transferred to Singhbhum district. While Patamda was added to Dhalbhum subdivision, Ichagarh and Chandil to Seraikela Sadar subdivision. Seraikela Kharsawan district was carved out of West Singhbhum district in 2001. The district has two subdivisions – Seraikela and Chandil. The headquarters of the district is at Seraikela town.

== Maoist activities ==
According to a PIB release in 2018, Seraikela Kharswan was not included in the list of the thirty districts most affected by Left wing extremism in the country. The list includes thirteen districts of Jharkhand.

Jharkhand Police has mentioned "Nimdih, Chandil, Chowka, Ichagarh, Tiruldih, Kharsawan and Kuchai" police station areas of Seraikela Kharsawan district as Naxalite affected.

Hemant Soren, Chief Minister of Jharkhand, has claimed, in September 2021, that as a result of the effective action against left wing extremism, the "presence of hardcore Maoists has been limited to mainly four regions, namely Parasnath Pahar, Budha Pahar, Tri-junction of Seraikela-Khunti-Chaibasa district in Kolhan division and some of the areas along the Bihar border".

== Geography ==
Kharsawan is located at 22.7897°N 85.8253°E.

The old and undivided Singhbhum district, of which the present Seraikela Kharsawan district was a part, has been described as "part of the southern fringe of the Chotanagpur plateau and is a hilly upland tract. There are hills alternating with valleys, steep mountains, deep forests on the mountain slopes, and, in the river basins, some stretches of comparatively level or undulating country."

It has an elevation range of 178–209 metres (584–686 ft). Subarnrekha and Kharkai are important rivers in the district.Chandil Dam has been built across the Subarnarekha, after Karkari River joins it.

Kharsawan CD block is bounded by Tamar CD block in Ranchi district and Chandil CD block on the north, Seraikela CD block on the east, Khuntpani CD block in Paschimi Singhbhum district on the south and Kuchai CD block on the west.

Kharsawan CD block has an area of 226.52 km^{2}.Kharsawan police station serves Kharsawan CD block. The headquarters of Kharsawan CD block is located at Kharsawan town.

== Demographics ==
=== Population ===
According to the 2011 Census of India, Kharsawan CD block had a total population of 88,642, all of which were rural. There were 45,001 (51%) males and 43,641 (49%) females. Population in the age range 0–6 years was 13,758. Scheduled Castes numbered 6,847 (7.72%) and Scheduled Tribes numbered 35,371 (39.90%).

=== Literacy ===
According to the 2011 census, the total number of literate persons in Kharsawan CD block was 48,927 (65.34% of the population over 6 years) out of which males numbered 29,481 (77.71% of the male population over 6 years) and females numbered 19,446 (52.63% of the female population over 6 years). The gender disparity (the difference between female and male literacy rates) was 25.09%.

As of 2011 census, literacy in Seraikela Kharsawan district was 68.85%. Literacy in Jharkhand was 67.63% in 2011. Literacy in India in 2011 was 74.04%.

See also – List of Jharkhand districts ranked by literacy rate

Literacy in CD Blocks of
Seraikela Kharsawan district
Seraikela Sadar subdivision
Kuchai – 52.97%
Kharsawan – 65.34%
Adityapur – 71.32%
Seraikela – 64.61%
Gobindpur – 63.19%
Chandil subdivision
Chandil – 66.74%
Ichagar – 61.02%
Kukru – 62.54%
Nimdih – 64.22%
Source: 2011 Census: CD block Wise
Primary Census Abstract Data

=== Language and religion ===
Languages of Kharsawan CD block (2011)
1. Odia (32.9%)
2. Ho (29.9%)
3. Bengali (11.8%)
4. Kurmali (11.3%)
5. Santali (4.22%)
6. Hindi (2.68%)
7. Urdu (2.52%)
8. Mundari (2.50%)
9. Others (2.21%)

According to the Population by Mother Tongue 2011 data, in the Kharsawan subdistrict, Odia was the mother-tongue of 29,166 persons forming 32.90% of the population, followed by (number of persons and percentage of population in brackets) Ho (26, 493/ 29.69%), Santali (13,746/ 15.51%), Bengali (10,456/ 11.80%), Hindi (3,575/ 4.03%), Urdu (2,233/ 2.52), Mundari (2,218/ 2.50%), and persons with other languages as mother-tongue (755/ 0.85%).'Other persons' included 481 persons having Kurukh/ Oraon as mother-tongue. Persons with Hindi as their mother-tongue included 352 persons having Sadan/ Sadri as mother-tongue.

Note: An attempt has been made to include all language groups each with at least 500 persons as their mother-tongue and only those groups with less than 500 persons as their mother-tongue are included in the "other languages" category. Comparatively smaller language groups with 200+ persons as their mother-tongue are mentioned in the text. Many languages have sub-groups. Those who are interested can see the reference for more details.

Hindi is the official language in Jharkhand and Urdu has been declared as an additional official language.

Religion in Kharsawan CD block (2011)
Hinduism	54.19%
Sarna	41.76%
Islam	3.69%
Other or not stated	0.36%

According to the Population by Religious Communities 2011 data, in the Kharsawan subdistrict, Hindus numbered 48,038 and formed 54.19% of the population, followed by (number of persons and percentage of population in brackets) Other religious communities (37,061/41.81), Muslims (3,273/ 3.69%), Christians (90/ 0.10%), and persons who did not state their religion (180/ 0.20%).

In Seraikela Kharsawan district, Scheduled Tribes numbered 255,626 and formed 24.00% of the total population. The larger groups within the scheduled tribes, with percentage of the ST population, were Santals 50.80%, Ho 34.87%, Mundas, Patars 17.60% and Oraons, Bhangar Oraons 4.12%.

== Economy ==
=== Overview ===
70-80% of the population of Seraikela Kharsawan district were in the BPL category in 2004–2005. In 2011–12, the proportion of BPL population in Seraikela Kharsawan district came down to 33.6%. According to a study in 2013 (modified in 2019), "the incidence of poverty in Jharkhand is estimated at 46%, but 60% of the scheduled castes and scheduled tribes are still below poverty line."

=== Livelihood ===
Livelihood
in Kharsawan CD block
1. Cultivators (32.3%)
2. Agricultural labourers (34.5%)
3. Household industries (6.32%)
4. Other Workers (27.0%)

In Kharsawan CD block in 2011, amongst the class of total workers, cultivators numbered 11,706 and formed 32.26%, agricultural labourers numbered 12,499 and formed 34.45%, household industry workers numbered 2,296 and formed 6.32% and other workers numbered 9,789 and formed 26.98%. Total workers numbered 36,286 and formed 40.94% of the total population, and non-workers numbered 52,356 and formed 59.06% of the population.

=== Infrastructure ===
There are 128 inhabited villages in Kharsawan CD block. In 2011, 111 villages had power supply. 31 villages had tap water, 122 villages had well water (covered/ uncovered), 120 villages had hand pumps, and all villages have drinking water facility. 6 villages had post offices, 6 villages had sub post offices, 17 villages had telephone (land line), 72 villages had mobile phone coverage. 128 villages had pucca (paved) village roads, 17 villages had bus service (public/ private), 18 villages had autos/ modified autos, 19 villages had taxi/ vans, 49 villages had tractors. 7 villages had bank branches, 5 village had agricultural credit society, 4 villages had public library and reading rooms, 22 villages had availability of newspapers, 42 villages had ration shops, 7 villages had weekly haat, 62 villages had assembly polling stations.

=== Backward Regions Grant Fund ===
Seraikela Kharsawan district is listed as a backward region and receives financial support from the Backward Regions Grant Fund. The fund, created by the Government of India, is “designed to redress regional imbalances in development”. As of 2012, 272 districts across the country were listed under this scheme. The list includes 21 districts of Jharkhand.

== Transport ==
Tatanagar-Bilaspur line

The Tatanagar-Bilaspur section of the Howrah-Nagpur-Mumbai line passes through Adityapur, Seraikela and Kharsawan CD blocks of Seraikela Kharsawan district. There are stations at Adityapur, Gamharia, Birbans, Sini, Mahali Marup and Rajkharsawan.

== Education ==
Kharsawan CD block had 8 villages with pre-primary schools, 112 villages with primary schools, 55 villages with middle schools, 9 villages with secondary schools, 2 villages with senior secondary schools, 15 villages with no educational facility.
.*Senior secondary schools are also known as Inter colleges in Jharkhand

== Healthcare ==
Kharsawan CD block had 3 villages with primary health centres, 8 villages with primary health subcentres, 5 villages with maternity and child welfare centres, 2 villages with allopathic hospitals, 1 village with dispensary, 1 village with veterinary hospital, 1 village with family welfare centre, 30 villages with medicine shops.
.*Private medical practitioners, alternative medicine etc. not included
