= Kuchai block =

Kuchai
- Community development block
- Coordinates: 22.7217°N 85.8063°E
- Country: India
- State: Jharkhand
- District: Seraikela Kharsawan

Government
  - Type: Federal democracy

Area
  - Total: 386.20 km^{2} (149.11 sq mi)

Population (2011)
  - Total: 64,320
  - Density: 166.5/km^{2} (431.4/sq mi)

Languages
  - Official: Hindi, Urdu
- Time zone: UTC+5:30 (IST)
- PIN: 833101
- Telephone/STD code: 06583
- Vehicle registration: JH 22
- Literacy: 52.97%
- Lok Sabha constituency: Khunti
- Vidhan Sabha constituency: Kharsawan
- Website: seraikela.nic.in

Kuchai block is a CD block that forms an administrative division in the Seraikela Sadar subdivision of Seraikela Kharsawan district, in the Indian state of Jharkhand.

== History ==
The British conquered Kolhan in 1837 and consequently formed a new district Singhbhum with headquarters at Chaibasa. In 1854, Singhbhum “became a non-regulation district under the jurisdiction of the Lt. Governor of Bengal”. The Rajas of Porhat/ Singhbhum, Seraikela and Kharswan held sway over their kingdoms under British protection. The native states of Seraikela and Kharsawan acceded to the Indian Union in 1948. Subsequently, Singhbhum district was divided into three subdivisions – Sadar, Dhalbhum and Seraikela. In 1956, along with the reorganisation of the states, three police stations of Manbhum district, namely Patamda, Ichagarh and Chandil were transferred to Singhbhum district. While Patamda was added to Dhalbhum subdivision, Ichagarh and Chandil to Seraikela Sadar subdivision. Seraikela Kharsawan district was carved out of West Singhbhum district in 2001. The district has two subdivisions – Seraikela and Chandil. The headquarters of the district is at Seraikela town.

== Maoist activities ==
According to a PIB release in 2018, Seraikela Kharswan was not included in the list of the thirty districts most affected by Left wing extremism in the country. The list includes thirteen districts of Jharkhand.

Jharkhand Police has mentioned “Nimdih, Chandil, Chowka, Ichagarh, Tiruldih, Kharsawan and Kuchai” police station areas of Seraikela Kharsawan district as Naxalite affected.

Hemant Soren, Chief Minister of Jharkhand, has claimed, in September 2021, that as a result of the effective action against left wing extremism, the “presence of hardcore Maoists has been limited to mainly four regions, namely Parasnath Pahar, Budha Pahar, Tri-junction of Seraikela-Khunti-Chaibasa district in Kolhan division and some of the areas along the Bihar border”.

== Geography ==
Kuchai is located at 22.7217°N 85.8063°E.

The old and undivided Singhbhum district, of which the present Seraikela Kharsawan district was a part, has been described as “part of the southern fringe of the Chotanagpur plateau and is a hilly upland tract. There are hills alternating with valleys, steep mountains, deep forests on the mountain slopes, and, in the river basins, some stretches of comparatively level or undulating country.”

It has an elevation range of 178–209 metres (584–686 ft). Subarnarekha and Kharkai are important rivers in the district.Chandil Dam has been built across the Subarnarekha, after Karkari River joins it.

Kuchai CD block is bounded by Tamar CD block in Ranchi district on the north, Kharsawan CD block on the east, Chakradharpur CD block in West Singhbhum district on the south, and Arki CD block in Khunti district on the west.

Kuchai CD block has an area of 386.20 km^{2}.Kuchai police station serves Kuchai CD block. The headquarters of Kuchai CD block is located at Kuchai village.

== Demographics ==
=== Population ===
According to the 2011 Census of India, Kuchai CD block had a total population of 64,320, all of which were rural. There were 32,443 (50%) males and 31,877 (50%) females. Population in the age range 0–6 years was 10,887. Scheduled Castes numbered 921 (1.43%) and Scheduled Tribes numbered 50,161 (77.99%).

=== Literacy ===
According to the 2011 census, the total number of literate persons in Kuchai CD block was 28,302 (52.97% of the population over 6 years) out of which males numbered 17,777 (66.21% of the male population over 6 years) and females numbered 10,525 (39.59% of the female population over 6 years). The gender disparity (the difference between female and male literacy rates) was 26.62%.

As of 2011 census, literacy in Seraikela Kharsawan district was 68.85%. Literacy in Jharkhand was 67.63% in 2011. Literacy in India in 2011 was 74.04%.

See also – List of Jharkhand districts ranked by literacy rate

Literacy in CD Blocks of
Seraikela Kharsawan district
Seraikela Sadar subdivision
Kuchai – 52.97%
Kharsawan – 65.34%
Adityapur – 71.32%
Seraikela – 64.61%
Gobindpur – 63.19%
Chandil subdivision
Chandil – 66.74%
Ichagar – 61.02%
Kukru – 62.54%
Nimdih – 64.22%
Source: 2011 Census: CD block Wise
Primary Census Abstract Data

=== Language and religion ===
Languages in Kuchai CD block (2011)
1. Mundari (51.2%)
2. Ho (26.7%)
3. Bengali (6.44%)
4. Kurmali (6.44%)
5. Odia (5.66%)
6. Santali (1.20%)
7. Others (2.32%)

According to the Population by Mother Tongue 2011 data, in the Kuchai subdistrict, Mundari was the mother-tongue of 32,961 persons forming 51.25% of the population, followed by (number of persons and percentage of population in brackets) Ho (17,167/ 29.69%), Bengali (4,140/ 6.44%), Odiya (3,658/ 5.69%), Santali (3,638/ 5.66%), Hindi (2,333/ 3.63%), and persons with other languages as mother-tongue (423/ 0.66%). 'Other languages' included 309 persons having Kurukh/ Oraon as their mother-tongue. Persons with Hindi as their mother-tongue included 1,271 persons having Panchpargania and 11,652 persons having Sadan/ Sadri as mother-tongue.

Note: An attempt has been made to include all language groups each with at least 500 persons as their mother-tongue and only those groups with less than 500 persons as their mother-tongue are included in the “other languages” category. Comparatively smaller language groups with 200+ persons as their mother-tongue are mentioned in the text. Many languages have sub-groups. Those who are interested can see the reference for more details.

Hindi is the official language in Jharkhand and Urdu has been declared as an additional official language.

Religion in Kuchai CD block (2011)
| Sarna | 73.69% |
| Hinduism | 21.63% |
| Christianity | 4.36% |
| Other or not stated | 0.32% |

According to the Population by Religious Communities 2011 data, in the Kuchai subdistrict, persons belonging to “other religious communities” numbered 47,411 and formed 73.71% of the population, followed by (number of persons and percentage of population in brackets) Hindus (13,910/ 21.63%), Christians (2,806/ 4.36%), Muslims (63/ 0.10%) and persons who did not state their religion (130/ 0.20%).

In Seraikela Kharsawan district, Scheduled Tribes numbered 255,626 and formed 24.00% of the total population. The larger groups within the scheduled tribes, with percentage of the ST population, were Santals 50.80%, Ho 34.87%, Mundas, Patars 17.60% and Oraons, Bhangar Oraons 4.12%.

== Economy ==
=== Overview ===
70-80% of the population of Seraikela Kharsawan district were in the BPL category in 2004–2005. In 2011-12, the proportion of BPL population in Seraikela Kharsawan district came down to 33.6%. According to a study in 2013 (modified in 2019), "the incidence of poverty in Jharkhand is estimated at 46%, but 60% of the scheduled castes and scheduled tribes are still below poverty line.”

=== Livelihood ===
Livelihood
in Kuchai CD block
1. Cultivators (44.5%)
2. Agricultural labourers (46.6%)
3. Household industries (1.51%)
4. Other Workers (7.33%)

In Kuchai CD block in 2011, amongst the class of total workers, cultivators numbered 14,442 and formed 44.55%, agricultural labourers numbered 15,107 and formed 46.60%, household industry workers numbered 490 and formed 1.51% and other workers numbered 2,377 and formed 7.33%. Total workers numbered 32,416 and formed 50.40% of the total population, and non-workers numbered 31,904 and formed 49.60% of the population.

=== Infrastructure ===
There are 99 inhabited villages in Kuchai CD block. In 2011, 35 villages had power supply. 3 villages had tap water, 96 villages had well water (covered/ uncovered), 77 villages had hand pumps, and all villages have drinking water facility. 5 villages had post offices, 4 villages had sub post offices, 3 villages had telephone (land line), 37 villages had mobile phone coverage. 99 villages had pucca (paved) village roads, 9 villages had bus service (public/ private), 7 villages had autos/ modified autos, 8 villages had taxi/ vans, 15 villages had tractors. 4 villages had bank branches, 1 village had an agricultural credit society, 22 villages had availability of newspapers, 21 villages had ration shops, 3 villages had weekly haat, 40 villages had assembly polling stations.

=== Backward Regions Grant Fund ===
Seraikela Kharsawan district is listed as a backward region and receives financial support from the Backward Regions Grant Fund. The fund, created by the Government of India, is ”designed to redress regional imbalances in development”. As of 2012, 272 districts across the country were listed under this scheme. The list includes 21 districts of Jharkhand.

== Education ==
Kuchai CD block had 13 villages with pre-primary schools, 87 villages with primary schools, 48 villages with middle schools, 7 villages with secondary schools, 4 villages with senior secondary schools, 11 villages with no educational facility.
.*Senior secondary schools are also known as Inter colleges in Jharkhand

== Healthcare ==
Kuchai CD block had 5 villages with primary health centres, 18 villages with primary health subcentres, 26 villages with maternity and child welfare centres, 1 village with allopathic hospital, 2 villages with dispensaries, 1 village with family welfare centre, 14 villages with medicine shops.
.*Private medical practitioners, alternative medicine etc. not included
