= Ichagarh block =

Ichagarh
- Community development block
- Coordinates: 23.0681°N 85.9356°E
- Country: India
- State: Jharkhand
- District: Seraikela Kharsawan

Government
  - Type: Federal democracy

Area
  - Total: 271.82 km^{2} (104.95 sq mi)

Population (2011)
  - Total: 83,099
  - Density: 305.71/km^{2} (791.79/sq mi)

Languages
  - Official: Hindi, Urdu
- Time zone: UTC+5:30 (IST)
- PIN: 832404
- Telephone/STD code: 06591
- Vehicle registration: JH 22
- Literacy: 61.02%
- Lok Sabha constituency: Ranchi
- Vidhan Sabha constituency: Ichagarh
- Website: seraikela.nic.in

Ichagarh block is a CD block that forms an administrative division in the Chandil subdivision of Seraikela Kharsawan district, in the Indian state of Jharkhand.

== History ==
The British conquered Kolhan in 1837 and consequently formed a new district Singhbhum with headquarters at Chaibasa. In 1854, Singhbhum “became a non-regulation district under the jurisdiction of the Lt. Governor of Bengal”. The Rajas of Porhat/ Singhbhum, Seraikela and Kharswan held sway over their kingdoms under British protection. The native states of Seraikela and Kharsawan acceded to the Indian Union in 1948. Subsequently, Singhbhum district was divided into three subdivisions – Sadar, Dhalbhum and Seraikela. In 1956, along with the reorganisation of the states, three police stations of Manbhum district, namely Patamda, Ichagarh and Chandil were transferred to Singhbhum district. While Patamda was added to Dhalbhum subdivision, Ichagarh and Chandil to Seraikela Sadar subdivision. Seraikela Kharsawan district was carved out of West Singhbhum district in 2001. The district has two subdivisions – Seraikela Sadar and Chandil. The headquarters of the district is at Seraikela town.

== Maoist activities ==
According to a PIB release in 2018, Seraikela Kharswan was not included in the list of the thirty districts most affected by Left wing extremism in the country. The list includes thirteen districts of Jharkhand.

Jharkhand Police has mentioned “Nimdih, Chandil, Chowka, Ichagarh, Tiruldih, Kharsawan and Kuchai” police station areas of Seraikela Kharsawan district as Naxalite affected.

Hemant Soren, Chief Minister of Jharkhand, has claimed, in September 2021, that as a result of the effective action against left wing extremism, the “presence of hardcore Maoists has been limited to mainly four regions, namely Parasnath Pahar, Budha Pahar, Tri-junction of Seraikela-Khunti-Chaibasa district in Kolhan division and some of the areas along the Bihar border”.

== Geography ==
Ichagarah is located at 23.0681°N 85.9356°E.

The old and undivided Singhbhum district, of which the present Seraikela Kharsawan district was a part, has been described as “part of the southern fringe of the Chotanagpur plateau and is a hilly upland tract. There are hills alternating with valleys, steep mountains, deep forests on the mountain slopes, and, in the river basins, some stretches of comparatively level or undulating country.”

It has an elevation range of 178–209 metres (584–686 ft). Subarnarekha and Kharkai are important rivers in the district.Chandil Dam has been built across the Subarnarekha, after Karkari River joins it.

Ichagarh CD block is bounded by Kukru CD block on the north, Nimdih CD block on the east, Chandil CD block on the south and Tamar and Sonahatu CD blocks in Ranchi district on the west.

Ichagarh CD block has an area of 271.82 km^{2}.Ichagarh police station serves Ichagarh CD block. The headquarters of Ichagarh CD block is located at Ichagarh village.

== Demographics ==
=== Population ===
According to the 2011 Census of India, Ichagarh CD block had a total population of 83,099, all of which were rural. There were 42,391 (51%) males and 40,708 (49%) females. Population in the age range 0–6 years was 12,766. Scheduled Castes numbered 6,357 (7.65%) and Scheduled Tribes numbered 26,804 (32.26%).

=== Literacy ===
According to the 2011 census, the total number of literate persons in Ichagarh CD block was 42,916 (61.02% of the population over 6 years) out of which males numbered 26,887 (74.98% of the male population over 6 years) and females numbered 16,029 (46.50% of the female population over 6 years). The gender disparity (the difference between female and male literacy rates) was 28.48%.

As of 2011 census, literacy in Seraikela Kharsawan district was 68.85%. Literacy in Jharkhand was 67.63% in 2011. Literacy in India in 2011 was 74.04%.

Literacy in CD Blocks of
Seraikela Kharsawan district
Seraikela Sadar subdivision
Kuchai – 52.97%
Kharsawan – 65.34%
Adityapur – 71.32%
Seraikela – 64.61%
Gobindpur – 63.19%
Chandil subdivision
Chandil – 66.74%
Ichagar – 61.02%
Kukru – 62.54%
Nimdih – 64.22%
Source: 2011 Census: CD block Wise
Primary Census Abstract Data

=== Language and religion ===
Languages in Ichagarh CD block (2011)
1. Bengali (73.7%)
2. Santali (12.3%)
3. Kurmali (9.31%)
4. Mundari (3.47%)
5. Others (1.25%)

According to the Population by Mother Tongue 2011 data, in the Ichagarh subdistrict, Bengali was the mother-tongue of 61,255 persons forming 73.71% of the population, followed by (number of persons and percentage of population in brackets) Santali (16,780/ 20.19%), Mundari (2,722/ 3.28%), Hindi (1,873/ 2.25%), and persons with other languages as mother-tongue (469/ 0.56%). Persons with Hindi as their mother-tongue included 925 persons having Purani/Puran bhasa, 220 persons having Panchpargania as mother-tongue. (Note: Note: An attempt has been made to include all language groups each with at least 500 persons as their mother-tongue and only those groups with less than 500 persons as their mother-tongue are included in the “other languages” category. Comparatively smaller language groups with 200+ persons as their mother-tongue are mentioned in the text. Many languages have sub-groups. Those who are interested can see the reference for more details.)

Hindi is the official language in Jharkhand and Urdu has been declared as an additional official language.

Religion in Ichagarh CD block (2011)
Hinduism	78.02%
Sarna	18.14%
Islam	2.68%
Christianity	0.61%
Other or not stated	0.55%

According to the Population by Religious Communities 2011 data, in the Ichagarh subdistrict, Hindus numbered 64,832 and formed 78.02% of the population, followed by (number of persons and percentage of population in brackets) Muslims (2,228/ 2.68%), Other religious communities (15,100/18.17), Christians (506/ 0.61%), and persons who did not state their religion (433/ 0.52%).

In Seraikela Kharsawan district, Scheduled Tribes numbered 255,626 and formed 24.00% of the total population. The larger groups within the scheduled tribes, with percentage of the ST population, were Santals 50.80%, Ho 34.87%, Mundas, Patars 17.60% and Oraons, Bhangar Oraons 4.12%.

== Economy ==
=== Overview ===
70-80% of the population of Seraikela Kharsawan district were in the BPL category in 2004–2005. In 2011-12, the proportion of BPL population in Seraikela Kharsawan district came down to 33.6%. According to a study in 2013 (modified in 2019), "the incidence of poverty in Jharkhand is estimated at 46%, but 60% of the scheduled castes and scheduled tribes are still below poverty line.”

=== Livelihood ===
Livelihood
in Ichagarh CD block
1. Cultivators (38.7%)
2. Agricultural labourers (49.1%)
3. Household industries (3.10%)
4. Other Workers (9.15%)

In Ichagarh CD block in 2011, amongst the class of total workers, cultivators numbered 16,482 and formed 38.69%, agricultural labourers numbered 20,897 and formed 49.06%, household industry workers numbered 1,321 and formed 3.10% and other workers numbered 3,896 and formed 9.15%. Total workers numbered 42,596 and formed 51.26% of the total population, and non-workers numbered 40,503 and formed 48.74% of the population.

=== Infrastructure ===
There are 107 inhabited villages in Ichagarh CD block. In 2011, 18 villages had power supply. 3 villages had tap water, 107 villages had well water (covered/ uncovered), 106 villages had hand pumps, and all villages have drinking water facility. 13 villages had post offices, 5 villages had sub post offices, 10 villages had telephone (land line), 26 villages had mobile phone coverage. 104 villages had pucca (paved) village roads, 6 villages had bus service (public/ private), 1 village had autos/ modified autos, 7 villages had taxi/ vans, 49 villages had tractors. 3 villages had bank branches, 2 villages had agricultural credit societies, 1 village had public library and reading room, 13 villages had availability of newspapers, 41 villages had ration shops, 11 villages had weekly haat, 63 villages had assembly polling stations.

=== Backward Regions Grant Fund ===
Seraikela Kharsawan district is listed as a backward region and receives financial support from the Backward Regions Grant Fund. The fund, created by the Government of India, is ”designed to redress regional imbalances in development”. As of 2012, 272 districts across the country were listed under this scheme. The list includes 21 districts of Jharkhand.

== Education ==
Ichagarh CD block had 14 villages with pre-primary schools, 91 villages with primary schools, 37 villages with middle schools, 4 villages with secondary schools, 3 villages with senior secondary schools, 15 villages with no educational facility.
.*Senior secondary schools are also known as Inter colleges in Jharkhand

== Healthcare ==
Ichagarh CD block had 1 village with primary health centre, 11 villages with primary health subcentres, 2 villages with maternity and child welfare centres, 1 village with family welfare centre, 2 villages with medicine shops.
.*Private medical practitioners, alternative medicine etc. not included
