= Chandil block =

Chandil
- Community development block
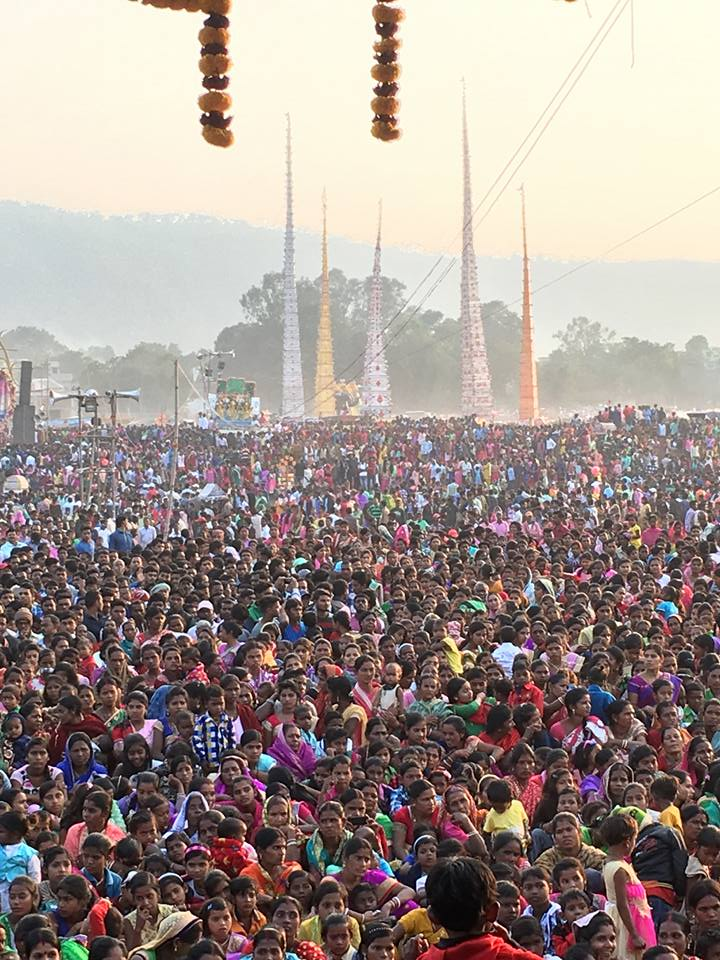
- The crowd at Tusu festival at Chandil. The tall structures in the background are called 'choudals'.

- Coordinates: 22.9681°N 86.0656°E
- Country: India
- State: Jharkhand
- District: Seraikela Kharsawan

Government
  - Type: Federal democracy

Area
  - Total: 375.68 km^{2} (145.05 sq mi)

Population (2011)
  - Total: 157,949
  - Density: 420.43/km^{2} (1,088.9/sq mi)

Languages
  - Official: Hindi, Urdu
- Time zone: UTC+5:30 (IST)
- PIN: 832401
- Telephone/STD code: 06591
- Vehicle registration: JH 22
- Literacy: 66.74%
- Lok Sabha constituency: Ranchi
- Vidhan Sabha constituency: Ichagarh
- Website: seraikela.nic.in

Chandil block is a CD block that forms an administrative division in the Chandil subdivision of Seraikela Kharsawan district, in the Indian state of Jharkhand.

== History ==
The British conquered Kolhan in 1837 and consequently formed a new district Singhbhum with headquarters at Chaibasa. In 1854, Singhbhum “became a non-regulation district under the jurisdiction of the Lt. Governor of Bengal”. The Rajas of Porhat/ Singhbhum, Seraikela and Kharswan held sway over their kingdoms under British protection. The native states of Seraikela and Kharsawan acceded to the Indian Union in 1948. Subsequently, Singhbhum district was divided into three subdivisions – Sadar, Dhalbhum and Seraikela. In 1956, along with the reorganisation of the states, three police stations of Manbhum district, namely Patamda, Ichagarh and Chandil were transferred to Singhbhum district. While Patamda was added to Dhalbhum subdivision, Ichagarh and Chandil to Seraikela Sadar subdivision. Seraikela Kharsawan district was carved out of West Singhbhum district in 2001. The district has two subdivisions – Seraikela Sadar and Chandil. The headquarters of the district is at Seraikela town.

== Maoist activities ==
According to a PIB release in 2018, Seraikela Kharswan was not included in the list of the thirty districts most affected by Left wing extremism in the country. The list includes thirteen districts of Jharkhand.

Jharkhand Police has mentioned “Nimdih, Chandil, Chowka, Ichagarh, Tiruldih, Kharsawan and Kuchai” police station areas of Seraikela Kharsawan district as Naxalite affected.

Hemant Soren, Chief Minister of Jharkhand, has claimed, in September 2021, that as a result of the effective action against left wing extremism, the “presence of hardcore Maoists has been limited to mainly four regions, namely Parasnath Pahar, Budha Pahar, Tri-junction of Seraikela-Khunti-Chaibasa district in Kolhan division and some of the areas along the Bihar border”.

== Geography ==
Chandil is located at 22.9681°N 86.0656°E.

The old and undivided Singhbhum district, of which the present Seraikela Kharsawan district was a part, has been described as “part of the southern fringe of the Chotanagpur plateau and is a hilly upland tract. There are hills alternating with valleys, steep mountains, deep forests on the mountain slopes, and, in the river basins, some stretches of comparatively level or undulating country.”

It has an elevation range of 178–209 metres (584–686 ft). Subarnarekha and Kharkai are important rivers in the district.Chandil Dam has been built across the Subarnarekha, after Karkari River joins it.

Chandil CD block is bounded by Ichagarh and Nimdih CD blocks on the north, Golmuri-cum-Jugsalai CD block in East Singhbhum district on the east, Adityapur, Seraikela and Kharsawan CD blocks on the south and Tamar CD block in Ranchi district on the west.

Chandil CD block has an area of 375.68 km^{2}.Chandil and Chowka police stations serve Chandil CD block. The headquarters of Chandil CD block is located at Chandil town.

== Demographics ==
=== Population ===
According to the 2011 Census of India, Chandil CD block had a total population of 157,949, of which 109,854 were rural and 48,095 were urban. There were 81,000 (51%) males and 76,949 (49%) females. Population in the age range 0–6 years was 25,357. Scheduled Castes numbered 7,755 (4.91%) and Scheduled Tribes numbered 47,748 (30.23%).

Census towns in Chandil CD block are (2011 population figure in brackets): Chandil (4,839) and Kopali (43,256).

=== Literacy ===
According to the 2011 census, the total number of literate persons in Chandil CD block was 88,493 (66.74% of the population over 6 years) out of which males numbered 52,645 (77.51% of the male population over 6 years) and females numbered 35,848 (55.43% of the female population over 6 years). The gender disparity (the difference between female and male literacy rates) was 22.09%.

As of 2011 census, literacy in Seraikela Kharsawan district was 68.85%. Literacy in Jharkhand was 67.63% in 2011. Literacy in India in 2011 was 74.04%.

See also – List of Jharkhand districts ranked by literacy rate

Literacy in CD Blocks of
Seraikela Kharsawan district
Seraikela Sadar subdivision
Kuchai – 52.97%
Kharsawan – 65.34%
Adityapur – 71.32%
Seraikela – 64.61%
Gobindpur – 63.19%
Chandil subdivision
Chandil – 66.74%
Ichagar – 61.02%
Kukru – 62.54%
Nimdih – 64.22%
Source: 2011 Census: CD block Wise
Primary Census Abstract Data

=== Language and religion ===
Languages in Chandil CD block (2011)
1. Bengali (53.1%)
2. Santali (15.6%)
3. Urdu (15.3%)
4. Hindi (9.41%)
5. Mundari (3.35%)
6. Others (3.24%)

According to the Population by Mother Tongue 2011 data, in the Chandil subdistrict, Bengali was the mother-tongue of 83,952 persons forming 53.15% of the population, followed by (number of persons and percentage of population in brackets) Santali (25,194/ 15.95%), Urdu (24,143/ 15.29), Hindi (16,809/ 10.64%), Mundari (5,295/ 3.35%), Malto (803/ 0.51%),Odiya (572/ 0.36%), and persons with other languages as mother-tongue (1,181/ 0.75%). ‘Other languages‘ included 202 persons having Maithili, 243 persons having Ho as mother-tongue. Persons with Hindi as their mother-tongue included 972 persons having Bhojpuri, 257 persons having Magadhi/Magahi, 282 persons having Purani/ Puran Bhasa as mother-tongue.

Note: An attempt has been made to include all language groups each with at least 500 persons as their mother-tongue and only those groups with less than 500 persons as their mother-tongue are included in the “other languages” category. Comparatively smaller language groups with 200+ persons as their mother-tongue are mentioned in the text. Many languages have sub-groups. Those who are interested can see the reference for more details.

Hindi is the official language in Jharkhand and Urdu has been declared as an additional official language.

Religion in Chandil CD block (2011)
Hinduism	55.45%
Islam	25.19%
Sarna	18.07%
Christianity	1.06%
Other or not stated	0.23%

According to the Population by Religious Communities 2011 data, in the Chandil subdistrict, Hindus numbered 87,584 and formed 59.20% of the population, followed by (number of persons and percentage of population in brackets) Muslims (39,784/ 26.89%), Other religious communities (18,655/12.61), Christians (1,667/ 1.13%), and persons who did not state their religion (259/ 0.18%).

In Seraikela Kharsawan district, Scheduled Tribes numbered 255,626 and formed 24.00% of the total population. The larger groups within the scheduled tribes, with percentage of the ST population, were Santals 50.80%, Ho 34.87%, Mundas, Patars 17.60% and Oraons, Bhangar Oraons 4.12%.

== Economy ==
=== Overview ===
70-80% of the population of Seraikela Kharsawan district were in the BPL category in 2004–2005. In 2011-12, the proportion of BPL population in Seraikela Kharsawan district came down to 33.6%. According to a study in 2013 (modified in 2019), "the incidence of poverty in Jharkhand is estimated at 46%, but 60% of the scheduled castes and scheduled tribes are still below poverty line.”

=== Livelihood ===
Livelihood
in Chandil CD block
1. Cultivators (18.9%)
2. Agricultural labourers (27.6%)
3. Household industries (1.80%)
4. Other Workers (51.6%)

In Chandil CD block in 2011, amongst the class of total workers, cultivators numbered 10,999 and formed 18.94%, agricultural labourers numbered 16,060 and formed 27.65%, household industry workers numbered 1,048 and formed 1.80% and other workers numbered 29,976 and formed 51.61%. Total workers numbered 58,083 and formed 36,77% of the total population, and non-workers numbered 99,866 and formed 63.23% of the population.

=== Infrastructure ===
There are 104 inhabited villages in Chandil CD block. In 2011, 77 villages had power supply. 9 villages had tap water, 103 villages had well water (covered/ uncovered), 102 villages had hand pumps, and 1 village did not have drinking water facility. 14 villages had post offices, 9 villages had sub post offices, 23 villages had telephone (land line), 37 villages had mobile phone coverage. 103 villages had pucca (paved) village roads, 26 villages had bus service (public/ private), 8 villages had autos/ modified autos, 8 villages had taxi/ vans, 54 villages had tractors. 7 villages had bank branches, 13 villages had agricultural credit societies, 25 villages had availability of newspapers, 39 villages had ration shops, 11 villages had weekly haat, 55 villages had assembly polling stations.

=== Backward Regions Grant Fund ===
Seraikela Kharsawan district is listed as a backward region and receives financial support from the Backward Regions Grant Fund. The fund, created by the Government of India, is ”designed to redress regional imbalances in development”. As of 2012, 272 districts across the country were listed under this scheme. The list includes 21 districts of Jharkhand.

== Transport ==
At Chandil railway station, the Barkakana-Muri-Chandil line meets the Asansol-Tatanagar-Kharagpur line.

== Education ==
Chandil CD block had 17 villages with pre-primary schools, 101 villages with primary schools, 49 villages with middle schools, 7 villages with secondary schools, 1 village with senior secondary school, 3 villages with no educational facility.
.*Senior secondary schools are also known as Inter colleges in Jharkhand

Singhbhum College was established at Chandil in 1973. It is affiliated with the Kolhan University.

== Culture ==
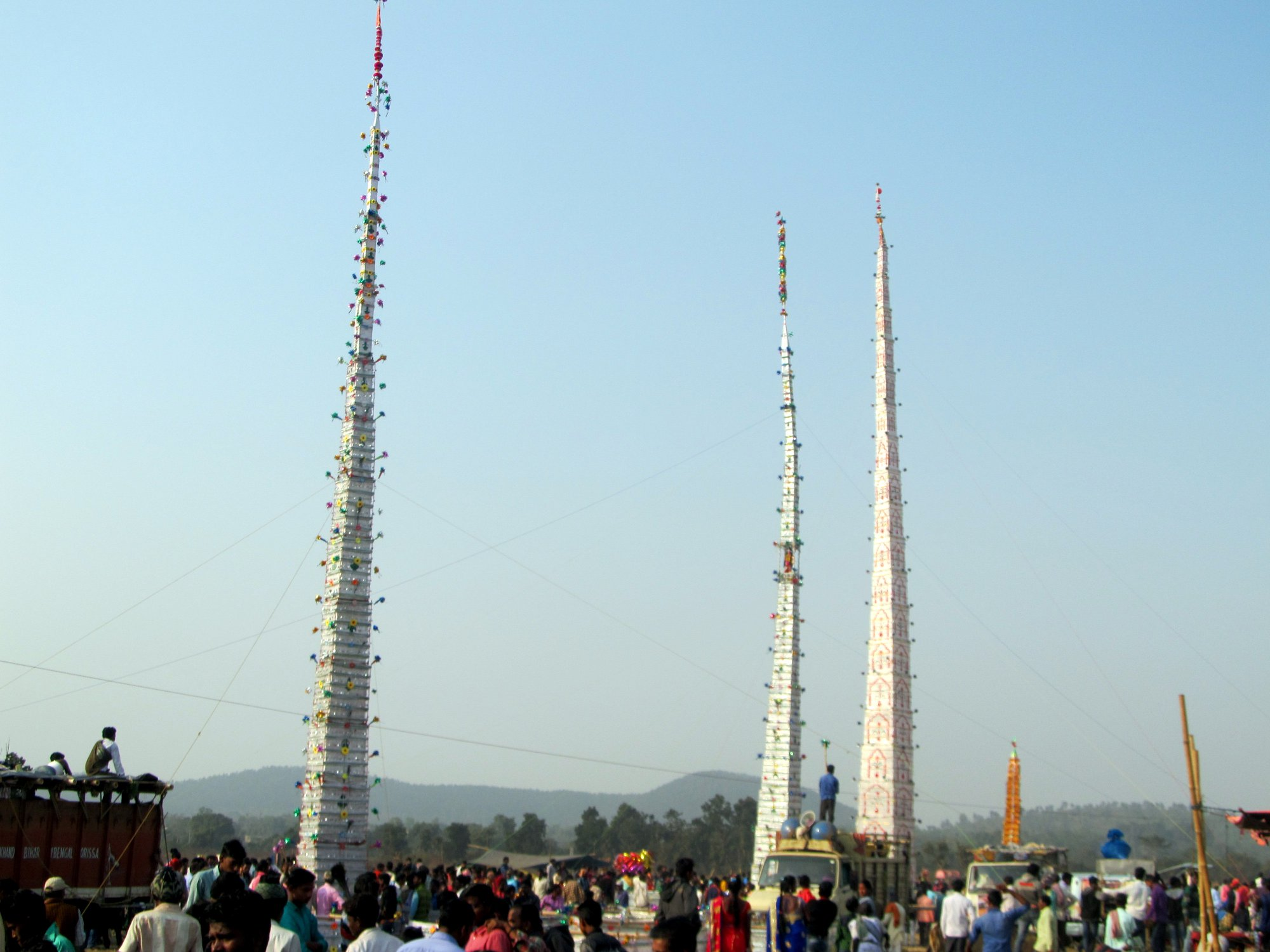
Choudals on display at Chandil

Tusu Festival is a rural harvest festival widely celebrated in the Chotanagpur area, in the month of Poush (December–January). The festival does not involve any idol worship but is a thanks-giving festival for the new harvest. Dinimai, the last stub remaining in the field after reaping, is brought home and established as Tusu. For a month the house is decorated and home-made sweets are distributed. On the Makar Sankranti day, Tusu is carried in a choudal (decorated bamboo framework) and immersed in a nearby water body.

== Healthcare ==
Chandil CD block had 2 villages with primary health centres, 10 villages with primary health subcentres, 6 villages with maternity and child welfare centres, 6 villages with allopathic hospitals, 5 villages with dispensaries, 2 villages with family welfare centres, 18 villages with medicine shops.
.*Private medical practitioners, alternative medicine etc. not included
