= Chandil subdivision =

- Subdivision
- Location in Jharkhand, India Chandil subdivision (India)
- Coordinates: 22.9681°N 86.0656°E
- Country: India
- State: Jharkhand
- District: Seraikela Kharsawan
- Headquarters: Seraikela

Area
  - Total: 1,019.23 km^{2} (393.53 sq mi)

Population
  - Total: 372,663
  - Density: 365.632/km^{2} (946.982/sq mi)

Languages
  - Official: Hindi, Urdu
- Time zone: UTC+5:30 (IST)
- Website: seraikela.nic.in

Chandil subdivision is an administrative subdivision of the Seraikela Kharsawan district in the Kolhan division in the state of Jharkhand, India.

== Administrative set up ==
Seraikela Kharsawan district has two subdivisions – (1) Seraikela Sadar subdivision with Seraikela, Kharsawan, Kuchai, Adityapur and Gobindpur CD blocks, and (2) Chandil subdivision with Chandil, Ichagarh, Kukru and Nimdih CD blocks.

The subdivisions of Seraikela Kharsawan district have the following distinctions:

Subdivision	Headquarters	Area km^{2}	Population (2011)	Rural population % (2011)	Urban population % (2011)
Seriakela Sadar	Seraikela	1,644.32	692,393	96.82	3.18
Chandil	Chandil	1,019.23	372,663	87.09	12.91

Note: Calculated on the basis of block-wise data available.

Cities, towns and locations in Seraikela Kharsawan district in Kolhan Division
M: municipality, R: rural/ urban centre, CT: census town, T: tourist centre
Owing to space constraints in the small map, the actual locations in a larger map may vary slightly

== Police stations ==
Police stations in the Chandil subdivision are at:

1. Chandil
2. Chowka
3. Ichagarh
4. Nimdih
5. Tiruldih

== Blocks ==
Community development blocks in the Chandil subdivision are:

CD Block	Headquarters	Area km^{2}	Population (2011)	SC %	ST %	Literacy rate %	CT
Chandil	Chandil	375.68	157,949	4.91	30.23	66.74	Chandil, Kopali
Ichagarh	Ichagarh	271.82	83,099	7.65	32.26	61.02	-
Kukru	Kukru	136.81	52,976	6.31	15.98	62.54	-
Nimdih	Nimdih	234.92	78,639	5.15	37.41	64.22	-

== Education ==
In 2011, in Chandil subdivision out of a total 318 inhabited villages there were 44 villages with pre-primary schools, 298 villages with primary schools, 163 villages with middle schools, 24 villages with secondary schools, 11 villages with senior secondary schools, 20 villages with no educational facility.
.*Senior secondary schools are also known as Inter colleges in Jharkhand

=== Educational institutions ===
The following institution is located in Chandil subdivision:

- Singhbhum College was established at Chandil in 1973.

== Healthcare ==
In 2011, in Chandil subdivision there were 6 villages with primary health centres, 45 villages with primary health subcentres, 31 villages with maternity and child welfare centres, 12 villages with allopathic hospitals, 8 villages with dispensaries, 1 village with a veterinary hospital, 4 villages with family welfare centres, 56 villages with medicine shops.
.*Private medical practitioners, alternative medicine etc. not included
