= Rajnagar, Seraikela Kharsawan =

Rajnagar
- Village
- Location in Jharkhand, India Rajnagar (India)
- Coordinates: 22.6273°N 86.0076°E
- Country: India
- State: Jharkhand
- District: Seraikela Kharsawan

Government
  - Type: Federal democracy

Population (2011)
  - Total: 1,806

Languages *
  - Official: Hindi, Santali
- Time zone: UTC+5:30 (IST)
- PIN: 831002
- Telephone/ STD code: 06597
- Vehicle registration: JH 22
- Literacy: 69.82%
- Lok Sabha constituency: Singhbhum
- Vidhan Sabha constituency: Seraikella
- Website: seraikela.nic.in

Rajnagar is a census town in the Gobindpur CD block in the Seraikela Sadar subdivision of the Seraikela Kharsawan district in the Indian state of Jharkhand.

== Geography ==
Cities, towns and locations in Seraikela Kharsawan district in Kolhan Division
M: municipality, R: rural/ urban centre, CT: census town, T: tourist centre
Owing to space constraints in the small map, the actual locations in a larger map may vary slightly

=== Location ===
Rajnagar is located at 22.6273°N 86.0076°E.

=== Area overview ===
The area shown in the map has been described as "part of the southern fringe of the Chotanagpur plateau and is a hilly upland tract". 75.7% of the population lives in the rural areas and 24.3% lives in the urban areas.

Note: The map alongside presents some of the notable locations in the district. All places marked in the map are linked in the larger full screen map.

== Civic administration ==
There is a police station at Rajnagar.

The headquarters of Gobindpur CD block are located at Rajnagar town.

== Demographics ==
According to the 2011 Census of India, Rajnagar had a total population of 1,806, of which 900 (50%) were males and 906 (50%) were females. Population in the age range 0–6 years was 222. The total number of literate persons in Rajnagar was 1,106 (69.82% of the population over 6 years).

(*For language details see Gobindpur block#Language and religion)

== Education ==
Government S.S.High School, Rajnagar, is a Hindi-medium coeducational institution established in 1959. It has facilities for teaching from class IX to class XII. The school has a playground and a library with 212 books.

Kasturba Gandhi Balika Vidyalaya is a Hindi-medium girls only institution established in 2006. It has facilities for teaching in classes VI and XII. The school has a playground, a library with 72 books and has 5 computers for teaching and learning purposes.

Academic English High School is an English-medium coeducational institution established in 1997. It has facilities for teaching from class I to class XII. The school has a playground, a library with 500 books and has 10 computers for teaching and learning purposes.
