= Kukru =

- Village
- Location in Jharkhand, India Kukru (India)
- Coordinates: 23.1181°N 85.9756°E
- Country: India
- State: Jharkhand
- District: Seraikela Kharsawan

Government
  - Type: Federal democracy

Population (2011)
  - Total: 3,292

Languages *
  - Official: Hindi, Urdu
- Time zone: UTC+5:30 (IST)
- PIN: 832402
- Telephone/ STD code: 06591
- Vehicle registration: JH 22
- Literacy: 59.08%
- Lok Sabha constituency: Ranchi
- Vidhan Sabha constituency: Ichagarh
- Website: seraikela.nic.in

Kukru is a village in the Kukru CD block in the Chandil subdivision of the Seraikela Kharsawan district in the Indian state of Jharkhand.

== Geography ==
Cities, towns and locations in Seraikela Kharsawan district in Kolhan Division
M: municipality, R: rural/ urban centre, CT: census town, T: tourist centre
Owing to space constraints in the small map, the actual locations in a larger map may vary slightly

=== Location ===
Kukru is located at 23.1181°N 85.9756°E.

=== Area overview ===
The area shown in the map has been described as "part of the southern fringe of the Chotanagpur plateau and is a hilly upland tract". 75.7% of the population lives in the rural areas and 24.3% lives in the urban areas.

Note: The map alongside presents some of the notable locations in the district. All places marked in the map are linked in the larger full screen map.

== Civic administration ==
The headquarters of Kukru CD block are located at Kukru village.

== Demographics ==
According to the 2011 Census of India, Kukru had a total population of 3,292, of which 1,718 (52%) were males and 1,574 (48%) were females. Population in the age range 0–6 years was 540. The total number of literate persons in Kukru was 1,626 (59.08% of the population over 6 years).

(*For language details see Kukru block#Language and religion)

== Education ==
Saheed Nirmal Mahato High School is a Hindi-medium coeducational institution established in 1993. It has facilities for teaching from class VI to class X.
