= Chowka, Seraikela Kharsawan =

Chowka Chauka
- Village
- Location in Jharkhand, India Chowka (India)
- Coordinates: 22.9672°N 85.9695°E
- Country: India
- State: Jharkhand
- District: Seraikela Kharsawan

Government
  - Type: Federal democracy

Population (2011)
  - Total: 1,492

Languages *
  - Official: Hindi, Urdu
- Time zone: UTC+5:30 (IST)
- PIN: 832404
- Telephone/ STD code: 06597
- Vehicle registration: JH 22
- Literacy: 80.96%
- Lok Sabha constituency: Ranchi
- Vidhan Sabha constituency: Ichagarh
- Website: seraikela.nic.in

Chowka (also spelled as Chauka) is a village in the Chandil CD block in the Chandil subdivision of the Seraikela Kharsawan district in the Indian state of Jharkhand.

== Geography ==
Cities, towns and locations in Seraikela Kharsawan district in Kolhan Division
M: municipality, R: rural/ urban centre, CT: census town, T: tourist centre
Owing to space constraints in the small map, the actual locations in a larger map may vary slightly

=== Location ===
Chauka is located at 22.9672°N 85.9695°E.

=== Area overview ===
The area shown in the map has been described as "part of the southern fringe of the Chotanagpur plateau and is a hilly upland tract". 75.7% of the population lives in the rural areas and 24.3% lives in the urban areas.

Note: The map alongside presents some of the notable locations in the district. All places marked in the map are linked in the larger full screen map.

== Civic administration ==
There is a police station at Chowka.

== Demographics ==
According to the 2011 Census of India, Chauka had a total population of 1,492, of which 780 (52%) were males and 712 (48%) were females. Population in the age range 0–6 years was 200. The total number of literate persons in Chauka was 1046 (80.96% of the population over 6 years).

(*For language details see Chandil block#Language and religion)

== Education ==
Government High School Chowka is a Hindi-medium coeducational institution established in 1958. It has facilities for teaching in classes IX and X.
