= Chandil =

- Census Town
- Location in Jharkhand India Chandil (India)
- Coordinates: 22.97°N 86.05°E
- Country: India
- State: Jharkhand
- District: Seraikela Kharsawan

Area
  - Total: 1.11 km^{2} (0.43 sq mi)
- Elevation: 246 m (807 ft)

Population (2011)
  - Total: 4,839
  - Density: 4,360/km^{2} (11,300/sq mi)

Languages*
  - Official: Hindi, Urdu
- Time zone: UTC+5:30 (IST)
- PIN: 832401
- Telephone code: +91 6591
- Vehicle registration: JH 22
- Literacy: 78.83%
- Lok Sabha constituency: Ranchi
- Vidhan Sabha constituency: Ichagarh
- Website: seraikela.nic.in

Chandil is a census town in the Chandil CD block in the Chandil subdivision of Seraikela Kharsawan district in the state of Jharkhand, India.

== Geography ==
Cities, towns and locations in Seraikela Kharsawan district in Kolhan Division
M: municipality, R: rural/ urban centre, CT: census town, T: tourist centre
Owing to space constraints in the small map, the actual locations in a larger map may vary slightly

=== Location ===
Chandil is located at 22.97°N 86.05°E. It has an average elevation of 246 metres (807 feet).

=== Area overview ===
The area shown in the map has been described as “part of the southern fringe of the Chotanagpur plateau and is a hilly upland tract”. 75.7% of the population lives in the rural areas and 24.3% lives in the urban areas.

Note: The map alongside presents some of the notable locations in the district. All places marked in the map are linked in the larger full screen map.

== Civic administration ==
There is a police station at Chandil.

The headquarters of Chandil CD block are located at Chandil town. Chandil also houses the headquarters of the Chandil subdivision.

The revenue headquarters of Chandil sub-division is located near Chandil Dam.

== Demographics ==
According to the 2011 Census of India, Chandil had a total population of 4,839, of which 2,500 (52%) were males and 2,339 (48%) were females. Population in the age range 0–6 years was 701. The total number of literate persons in Chandil was 3,262 (78.83% of the population over 6 years).

(*For language details see Chandil block#Language and religion)

As of 2001 India census, Chandil had a population of 4,341. Males constitute 52% of the population and females 48%. Chandil has an average literacy rate of 63%, higher than the national average of 59.5%; with male literacy of 71% and female literacy of 53%. 14% of the population is under 6 years of age.

== Infrastructure ==
According to the District Census Handbook 2011, Seraikela Kharsawan, Chandil covered an area of 1.11 km^{2} (0.43 sq mi). It has an annual rainfall of 1,132.9 mm (44.60 in). Among the civic amenities, it had eleven km (6.8 mi) of roads with both closed and open drains, the protected water supply involved tap water from treated sources, hand pump, pressure tank. It had 786 domestic electric connections, 10 road lighting points. Among the medical facilities, it had 6 hospitals, 2 dispensaries, 2 health centres, 1 family welfare centre, 1 maternity and child welfare centre, 1 maternity home, 1 nursing home, 1 charitable hospital/ nursing home, 1 veterinary hospital, 6 medicine shops. Among the educational facilities it had 5 primary schools, 3 middle schools, 3 secondary schools, 2 senior secondary schools, 1 general degree college. It had 1 non-formal education centre (Sarva Shiksha Abhiyan), 1 special school for the disabled. Among social, cultural and recreational facilities, it had 1 cinema theatre, 1 auditorium/ community hall. Three important commodities it produced were ready-made clothes, furniture, medicines. It had the branch offices of 2 nationalised banks, 1 agricultural credit society, 1 non-agricultural credit society.

== Industry ==
The first commercial sponge iron plant in India is located at Umesh Nagar in Chandil.

== Transport ==
At Chandil railway station, the Barkakana-Muri-Chandil line meets the Asansol-Tatanagar-Kharagpur line.

== Media ==
A number of Hindi, Bengali, and English newspapers are published from the Jamshedpur city and circulated here. Out of these, Hindustan, Prabhat Khabar and Dainik Jagran have the highest readership. City centric TV programming is provided by the 24-hour news channel Sahara Samay (Jamshedpur) and several other channels are telecast by local cable operators.

== Tourism ==
- Chandil Dam - Chandil Dam, standing on the Subarnarekha River, is 220 meter in height and the height of its water level is 190 meters. A museum, located close to the dam, has scripts written on rocks, which are 2000 years old. The River Swarnarekha flows through this region. The Karkori River originating from the Hundru falls mingles with the Swarnarekha River here at Chandil.
- Ichagarh Palace - Ichagarh was the capital of erstwhile Patkum state which consisted modern day Chandil, Kukru, Nimdih, Ichagarh, Kandra, and adjoining regions of erstwhile Manbhum district of Bengal. Established by the Scion of King Vikramaditya of Ujjain, the region hosts several ancient temples, relics and an ancient palace on the banks of river Karkari and Swarnarekha.
- Jayda Temple - An ancient temple of Lord Shiva, built by Raja Vikram Aditya Deo of erstwhile Patkum Estate (Ichagarh) one of the pilgrimage of Jharkhand. Situated on the way to Ranchi-Tata. A fair is held here every year on the eve of Makar Sankranti.
- SAI BABA Temple (HUMID) - A temple of Lord SAI BABA situated in the way to Ranchi-Tata.
- MATHIA Temple - also known as Sadhu Baandh mathia is one of the centers of JUNA AKHADA. It is one of the ashrams of SWAMI PRAMANAND and has hosted many Hath Yogis. The only Rath Yatra of Chandil is organized by this temple.
- Dalma Wildlife Sanctuary -The Dalma mountains, which are the "crown of Chandil Block", is a safe haven for wild animals like elephants, deer, wild pigs, sambhar and several species of birds and snakes. Dalma Wild Life Sanctuary is home to elephants and deer.
- Sheesh Mahal Auditorium - the sheesh mahal palace is collection of ancient temple sculpture.

== Education ==
Singhbhum College was established at Chandil in 1973. Affiliated with the Kolhan University it offers honours courses in Hindi, Bengali, Santali, Sanskrit, history, economics, philosophy, political science, psychology, physics, chemistry, mathematics, accountancy, M.Com, and general courses in arts, science and commerce.

Chandil Polytechnic offers diploma courses in engineering.

Singhbhum College is a Hindi-medium co-educational institution established in 1965. It has facilities for teaching in classes XI and XII. It has a library with 1,200 books.

Government S.S. High School Chandil is a Hindi-medium coeducational institution established in 1962. It has facilities for teaching from class IX to class XII. The school has a library with 2,078 books.

Vivekananda International High School is an English-medium co-educational institution established in 1998. It has facilities for teaching from class I to class XII. The school has a library with 352 books and has 5 computers for teaching and learning purposes.

== Gallery ==
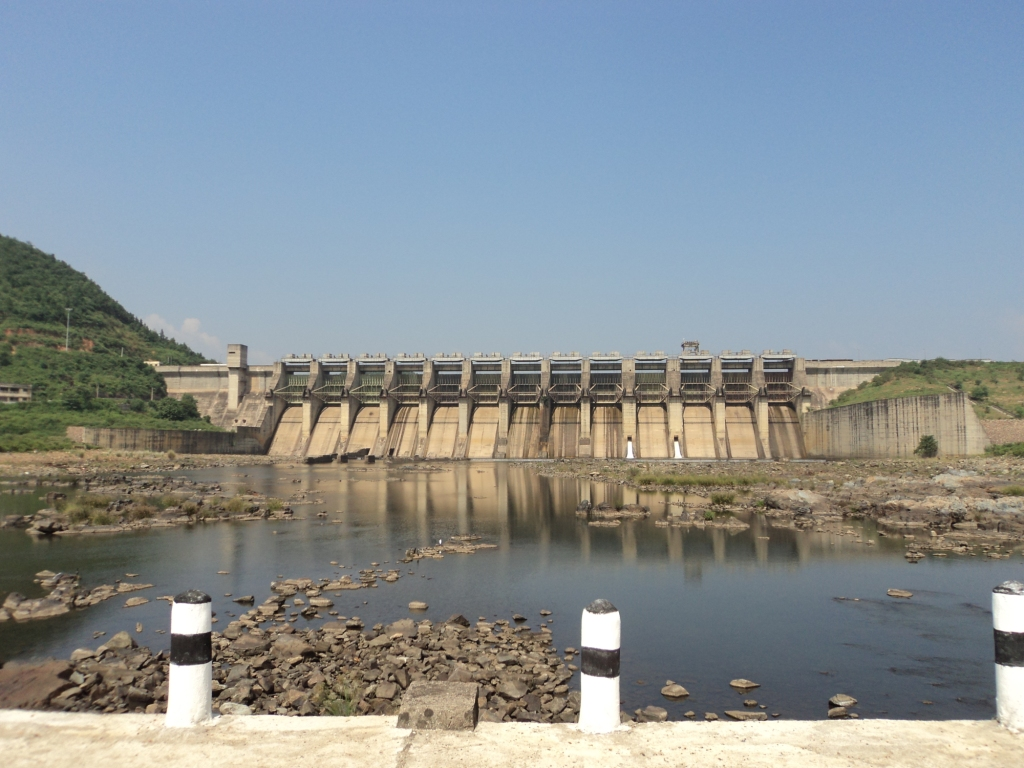
Chandil Dam

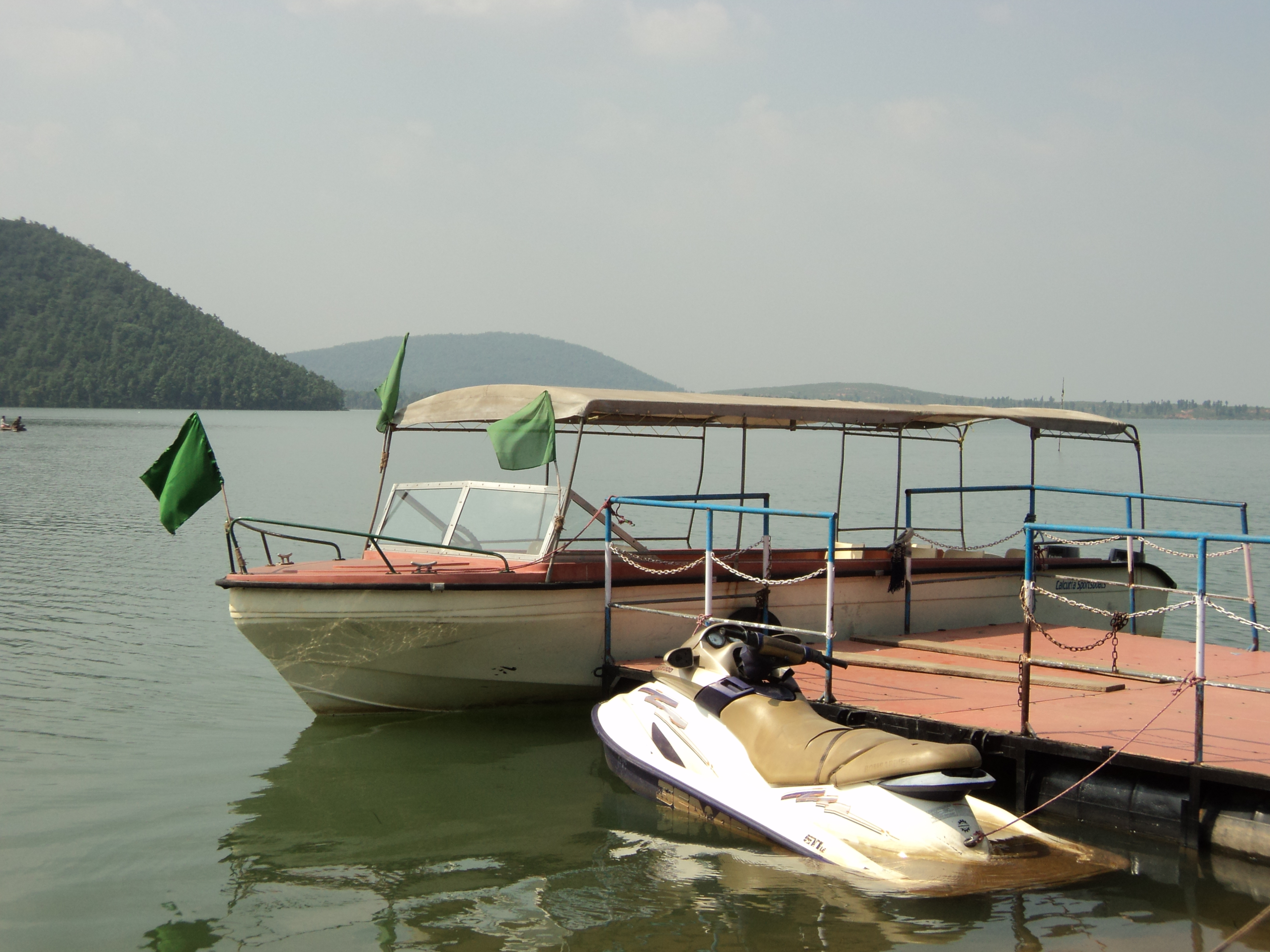
Boats at Dam

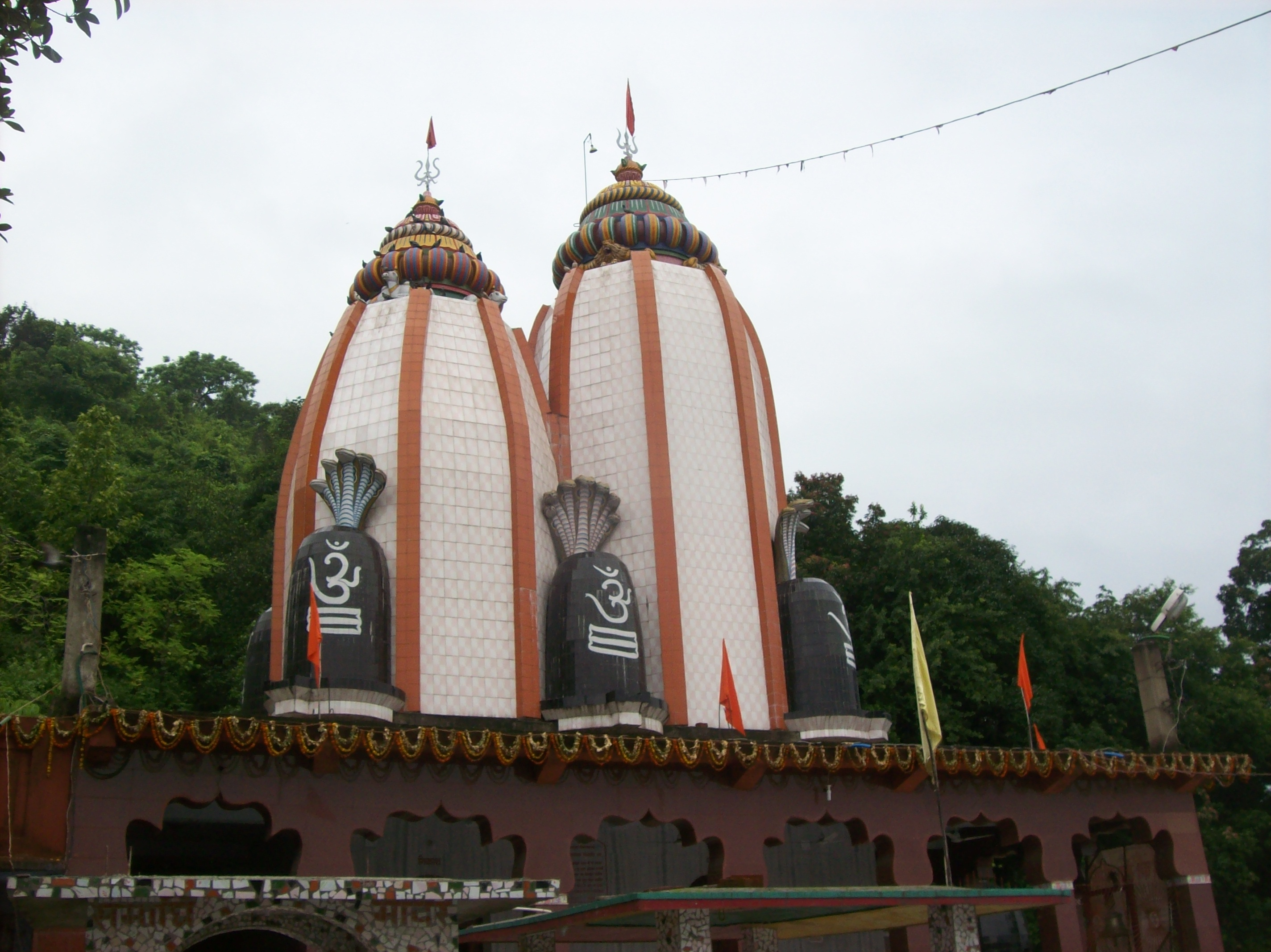
Jayda Temple

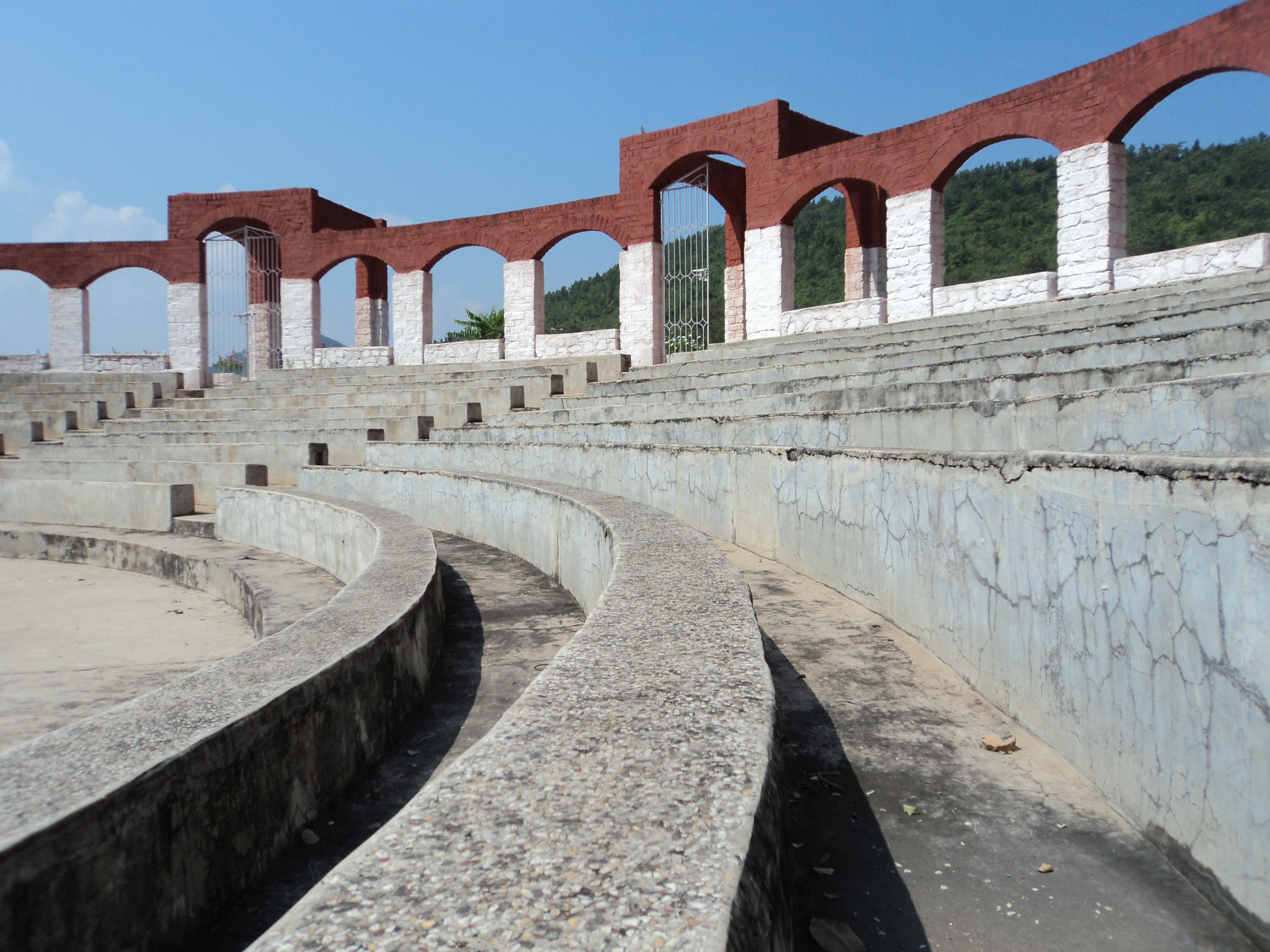
Sheesh Mahal Auditorium(Chandil Dam)

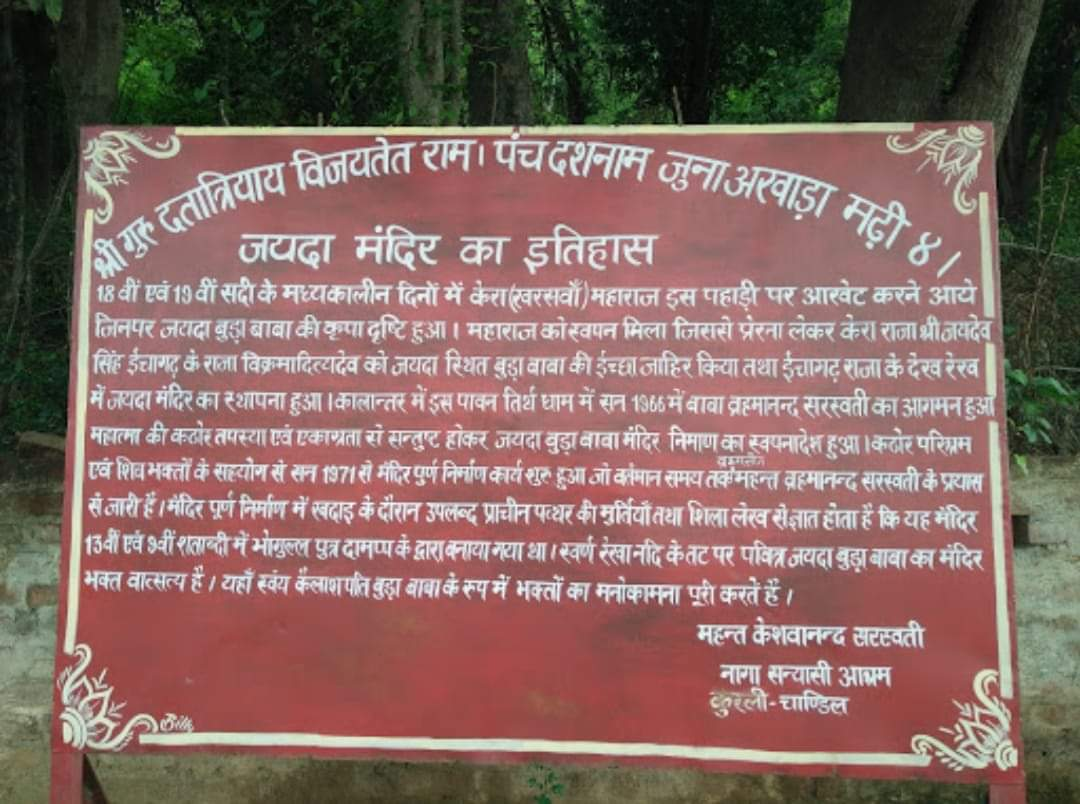
Jayda Mandir
