= Kharsawan State =

Princely state of the British Raj

Coordinates: 22.8°N 85.83°E

Kharsawan State ଖରସୁଆଁ ରାଜ୍ୟ
- Princely State of British India
- 1650–1947
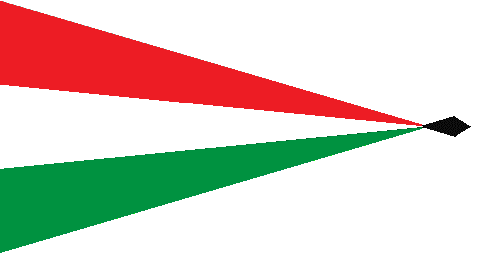
- Flag

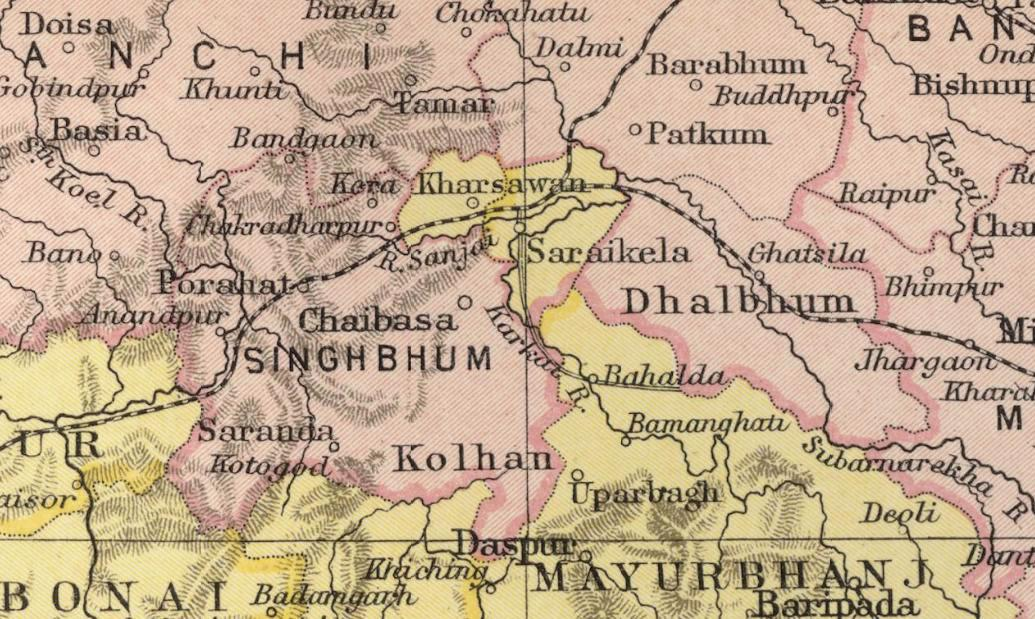
- Kharsawan State in a 1909 Imperial Gazetteer of India map
- Area
  - 1892: 396 km^{2} (153 sq mi)
  - 1941: 410 km^{2} (160 sq mi)
- Population
  - 1892: 31,051
  - 1941: 50,580
- History
  - Established: 1650
  - Independence of India: 1947
Succeeded by
India

Kharsawan State, also spelt Kharsua or kharaswan, was a princely state in India during the British Raj. The state had a privy purse of 33,000 rupees. It was one of the Odia Princely states of India during the period of the British Raj and the major language spoken in the area is Odia.

The capital was the city of Kharsawan and the former area of Kharsawan State is now a part of Jharkhand, where its district is named Seraikela Kharsawan district. Kumar Aditya Narayan Singh Deo and his father Maharaj Kumar Rudra Pratap Singh Deo appreciated the name change of the district.

== History ==
Kharsawan state was founded in 1650. The rulers of Kharsawan are descended from Kunwar Bikram Singh of Porahat, the first ruler of neighbouring Seraikela State and belonged to Rathore clan of Rajputs. His second son, Kunwar Padam Singh was the founder of Kharsawan. In 1857 Kharsawan estate was recognized as a state.

In 1912 Kharsawan came under the authority of the province of Bihar and Orissa, which had been carved from the eastern districts of Bengal. In 1936 the state was placed under the authority of the Orissa Province. Saraikela, along with 24 other princely states of the Eastern States Agency, acceded to the Government of India on 1 January 1948, with a will to merge the princely state with Orissa province of the Indian Republic.

As a result, both Kharsawan and Saraikela princely states were merged with Orissa in 1948. On 1 January 1948 itself, the tribals of these two princely states, who were in a majority, revolted against the merger with Orissa resulting to the thousands of tribes killed by the Orrisa military police . This was supported by Patayet Sahib Maharajkumar Bhoopendra Narayan Singh Deo, third son of Raja Aditya Pratap Singh Deo, as a result of which he was imprisoned to ensure the popular movement died down. The central government appointed a commission under Mr. Baudkar to look into the matter. On the basis of the Baudkar commission report, Saraikela and Kharsawan princely states were merged with Bihar on 18 May 1948. These two princely states became part of Jharkhand when the state was separated from Bihar on 15 November 2000. From 18 May 1948 onward, many non-tribal Odias of the districts of Saraikela Kharsawan, East Singhbhum, and West Singhbhum have migrated and settled permanently in Orissa.

=== Rulers ===
Former rulers bore the title of 'Thakur' until 1917. The title of Raja was granted to Kharsawan rulers in 1902, beginning with Raja Ram Chandra Singh Deo.

The present head of the royal family is Raja Gopal Narayan Singh Deo.

The last ruler of the state, HH Raja Siram Chandra Singh Deo, signed the merger agreement acceding to the Indian Union on 18 May 1948. The Maharaja of Darbhanga used to visit this state to pay respects as the trade route to the east coast ran through the thick jungles of Singhbhum and safety was guaranteed only to those who were in the good books.

==== Thakurs ====
- 1857 – 1863 Gangaram Singh Deo (b. 1836 – d. 18..) (personal style Raja from 1860)
- 1863 – 18.. Ram Narain Singh
- 18.. – 2 March 1884 Raghunath Singh Deo (b. 1841 – d. 1884)
- 2 March 1884 – 6 February 1902 Mahendra Narayan Singh Deo (b. 1869 – d. 19..)
- 6 February 1902 – 1917 Siram Chandra Singh Deo (b. 1892 – d. 19..)

==== Raja ====
- 1917 – 15 August 1947 Siram Chandra Singh Deo (s.a.)

== Demographics ==
Historical population
Year	Pop.	±%
1891	36,993	—
1901	38,065	+2.9%
1911	40,426	+6.2%
1921	38,864	−3.9%
1931	44,805	+15.3%
1941	50,580	+12.9%
Source: Census of British India

=== Communities and languages ===
According to the 1941 Census, Kharsawan state (area: 157 square miles (410 km^{2})) had a population of 50,580, characterized by an indigenous tribal majority and a multilingual environment.

==== Religion ====
Religious demographics of Kharsawan State (1941)
1. Tribal beliefs (58.0%)
2. Hinduism (22.1%)
3. Islam (2.00%)
4. Sikhism & Christianity (0.04%)
5. Others / Unspecified (17.8%)
Total population: 50,580

Based on the 1941 data, Tribal beliefs constituted 58.03% of the population, with Hinduism (22.14%), Islam (2%), and others forming the remainder. Key tribal groups included the Ho (20.92%), Munda (17.25%), Bhumij (3.99%), Santal (2.65%), and Oraon (2.21%). The overall literacy rate was 6.78%.

==== Language ====
Linguistic breakdown of Kharsawan State (1941)
1. Odia (41.5%)
2. Ho (20.9%)
3. Mundari (17.2%)
4. Hindustani / Magahi (11.2%)
5. Bhumij (3.99%)
6. Santali (2.65%)
7. Kurukh (Oraon) (2.21%)
8. Others (0.28%)
Excludes the neighboring Saraikela State dataset. Total population: 50,580.

Odia was the largest mother tongue spoken by 41.50% of the populace, functioning as the primary language of administration and local trade. This was followed closely by a robust block of Austroasiatic tongues, principally Ho (20.92%) and Mundari (17.25%), reflecting the state's significant tribal population. Hindustani dialects, including Eastern Magahi variations, were spoken by 11.20%, while minor regional clusters spoke Bhumij, Santali, and Kurukh.

== See also ==
- Political integration of India
- Saraikela State
