= Saraikela =

Saraikela Saraikella, Seraikella
- Town
- Location in Jharkhand, India Saraikela (India)
- Coordinates: 22°42′8.091″N 85°55′53.628″E
- Country: India
- State: Jharkhand
- District: Saraikela Kharsawan

Government
  - Type: Municipal governance in India
  - Body: Saraikela Nagar Panchayat

Area
  - Total: 5.62 km^{2} (2.17 sq mi)

Population (2011)
  - Total: 14,252
  - Density: 2,540/km^{2} (6,570/sq mi)

Demographic
  - Literacy rate: 67.70 %
  - Sex ratio: 958

Language
  - Official: Hindi and English
  - Regional: Odia, Ho, Mundari, Bengali and Santali
- Time zone: UTC+5:30 (IST)
- PIN: 833219
- Telephone code: 06597
- Vehicle registration: JH-22
- Literacy: 83.80%
- Lok Sabha constituency: Singhbhum
- Vidhan Sabha constituency: Seraikella
- Website: seraikela.nic.in

Saraikela (also spelled Seraikella) is the district headquarters and a nagar panchayat in the Seraikela Sadar subdivision of the Seraikela Kharsawan district in the Indian state of Jharkhand. It was formerly the capital of Saraikela State, a princely state. The town is a road junction, an agricultural trade centre and upcoming industrial centre. It is situated between Jamshedpur and Chaibasa.

== History ==
=== Saraikela state ===
The Saraikela state was founded in 1620 by Raja Bikram Singh (a fore-runner to the ruling family's current nomenclature of Singh Deo).

== Geography ==
Cities, towns and locations in Seraikela Kharsawan district in Kolhan Division
M: municipality, R: rural/ urban centre, CT: census town, T: tourist centre
Owing to space constraints in the small map, the actual locations in a larger map may vary slightly

=== Location ===
Saraikela is situated on the bank of Kharkai River in southern Jharkhand. It is well connected with Jamshedpur via land route.

=== Area overview ===
The area shown in the map has been described as “part of the southern fringe of the Chotanagpur plateau and is a hilly upland tract”. 75.7% of the population lives in the rural areas and 24.3% lives in the urban areas.

Note: The map alongside presents some of the notable locations in the district. All places marked in the map are linked in the larger full screen map.

== Civic administration ==
There is a police station at Seraikela.

The headquarters of Seraikela CD block are located at Seraikela. The headquarters of the district and subdivision are located at Seraikela.

== Demographics ==
Historical population
Year	Pop.	±%
1941	6,105	—
1951	4,777	−21.8%
1961	5,452	+14.1%
1971	6,290	+15.4%
1981	7,865	+25.0%
1991	11,178	+42.1%
2001	12,270	+9.8%
2011	14,252	+16.2%
Source: Census of India

According to the 2011 Census of India, Seraikela had a total population of 14,252, of which 7,450 (52%) were males and 6,802 (48%) were females. Population in the age range 0–6 years was 1,675. The total number of literate persons in Seraikela was 10,539 (83.80% of the population over 6 years).

Languages spoken in Seraikela census town (2011)
1. Odia (51.4%)
2. Hindi (20.2%)
3. Bengali (13.1%)
4. Ho (9.90%)
5. Santali (2.40%)
6. Other (3.00%)

As of 2001 India census, Seraikela had a population of 12,260. Males constitute 53% of the population and females 47%. Seraikela has an average literacy rate of 70%, higher than the national average of 59.5%: male literacy is 78%, and female literacy is 61%. In Seraikela, 12% of the population is under 6 years of age.

== Infrastructure ==
According to the District Census Handbook 2011, Seraikela Kharsawan, Seraikela covered an area of 5.62 km^{2} (2.17 sq mi). It has an annual rainfall of 1,132.9 mm (44.60 in). Among the civic amenities, it had 12 km (7.5 mi) of roads with open drains. The protected water supply involved tap water from treated sources, hand pump, overhead tank. It had 2,436 domestic electric connections, 150 road lighting points. Among the medical facilities, it had 4 hospitals (with 100 beds), 2 dispensaries, 2 health centres, 1 family welfare centre, 6 maternity and child welfare centres, 2 maternity homes, 1 nursing home, 2 charitable hospital/ nursing homes, 1 veterinary hospital, 9 medicine shops. Among the educational facilities it had 11 primary schools, 8 middle schools, 3 secondary schools, 3 senior secondary schools, 1 general degree college. It had 1 non-formal education centre (Sarva Shikhsha Abhiyan). Among social, cultural and recreational facilities, it had 1 stadium, 1 auditorium/ community hall, 1 public library, 1 reading room. Three important commodities it produced were iron, snacks, mineral water. It had the branch offices of 6 nationalised banks, 2 co-operative banks, 10 agricultural credit societies.

== Business and industry ==
The main business families of Seraikela include the Choudhary, Sekseria and Sahu families, who are involved in various business enterprises in Seraikela. Abhijeet Group (Corporate Ispat & Alloys Ltd.) is setting up its steel & power plant in Seraikela (7 km from Town). Jupiter Cement is also setting up a Portland cement plant nearby. Steel plant of Sesa Goa and Bharat Steel are also proposed in the area.

== Education ==
Kashi Sahu College was established in 1969. Affiliated with the Kolhan University it offers undergraduate courses in arts, science and commerce, and post graduate courses in arts. It has more than 4,000 students.

K.S. College Seraikella is a Hindi-medium coeducational institution established in 1969. It has facilities for teaching in classes XI and XII. It has a playground.

N.R. High School is a Hindi-medium coeducational institution established in 1924. It has facilities for teaching from class IX to class XII. It has a playground, a library with 800 books and has 1 computer for teaching and learning purposes.

Model School Seraikela is an English-medium coeducational institution established in 2012. It has facilities for teaching from class VI to class XII.

== Culture ==
Saraikela is known for its Chhau dance. It is a unique amalgamation of Oriya and Ho tribal culture. The palace of the former Raja, Kudarsai temple, Guest House and the Shiva temple are some cultural places to visit. Rath yatra and Durga puja are some festivals celebrated with much joy. It is also famous for its laddu.

== Sports ==
The 20,000-capacity Birsa Munda Stadium is located in Saraikela. It is used mostly for cricket and football.
