= Ara, Ramgarh =

Ara
- Census Town
- Location in Jharkhand, India Ara (India)
- Coordinates: 23.7431°N 85.5557°E
- Country: India
- State: Jharkhand
- District: Ramgarh District

Population (2011)
  - Total: 13,547

Languages (*For language details see Mandu (community development block)#Language and religion)
  - Official: Hindi, Urdu
- Time zone: UTC+5:30 (IST)
- PIN: 825316
- Telephone/ STD code: 06545
- Vehicle registration: JH
- Lok Sabha constituency: Hazaribagh
- Vidhan Sabha constituency: Mandu
- Website: ramgarh.nic.in

Ara is a census town in the Mandu CD block in the Ramgarh subdivision of the Ramgarh district in the state of Jharkhand, India.

== Geography ==
Cities, towns and locations in Ramgarh district in North Chotanagpur Division
M: municipality, CT: census town, R: rural/ urban centre, T: tourist centre, P: power plant
Abbreviation used- TPP: thermal power project
Owing to space constraints in the small map, the actual locations in a larger map may vary slightly

=== Location ===
Ara is located at 23.7431°N 85.5557°E.

=== Area overview ===
Ramgarh has a coal-mining sector. The map alongside provides links to five operational areas of Central Coalfields spread across South Karanpura Coalfield, Ramgarh Coalfield and West Bokaro Coalfield. Four of the six CD blocks in the district have coal mines – Patratu, Ramgarh, Mandu and Chitarpur. The high concentration of census towns in these blocks are noticeable on the map. Only two blocks, Gola and Dulmi, are totally rural areas. Ramgarh district lies in the central part of the Chota Nagpur Plateau. The Damodar valley covers most of the district. The forested areas in highlands to the north and the south of the valley can be seen in the map (mark the shaded areas). "Chotanagpur has a charm of its own… The entire area forms one of the most charming series of views imaginable. The far-off hills in the background in exquisite tints of blue or purple as the light falls, the nearer hills picturesquely shaped and luxuriant in every shade of green with their bold escarpments in black or grey, and the brown plains below furnishing their quota of colours."

Note: The map alongside presents some of the notable locations in the district. All places marked in the map are linked in the larger full screen map.

== Demographics ==
According to the 2011 Census of India, Ara had a total population of 13,547, of which 7,031 (52%) were males and 6,516 (48%) were females. Population in the age range 0–6 years was 1,840. The total number of literate persons in Ara was 9,069 (77.47% of the population over 6 years).

As of 2001 India census, Ara had a population of 14,181. Males constitute 54% of the population and females 46%. Ara has an average literacy rate of 58%, lower than the national average of 59.5%; with 63% of the males and 37% of females literate. 15% of the population is under 6 years of age.

== Infrastructure ==
According to the District Census Handbook 2011, Ramgarh, Ara covered an area of 8.081 km^{2}. Among the civic amenities, it had 18 km roads with open drains, the protected water supply involved tap water from treated sources, uncovered wells, pressure tanks. It had 2,660 domestic electric connections, 50 road lighting points. Among the medical facilities, it had 8 hospitals, 1 dispensary, 1 health centre, 63 family welfare centres, 63 maternity and child welfare centres, 63 maternity homes, 3 nursing home, 8 medicine shops. Among the educational facilities it had 5 primary schools, 4 middle schools, 1 secondary school, 1 senior secondary school, the nearest general degree college at Ramgarh Cantonment 12 km away. Among the social, recreational and cultural facilities it had 1 stadium, 1 auditorium/ community hall. One important commodity it produced was coal. It had the branch offices of 3 nationalised banks, 1 agricultural credit society, 1 non-agricultural credit society.

== Economy ==
The projects of the Kuju Area of Central Coalfields are: Saruberia underground, Saruberia opencast, Ara open cast, Kuju underground, Topa underground, Topa open cast, Pindra underground, Pindra open cast, Pundi open cast, Karma opencast. The area office is at Hesagarha, Kuju 825316.
