= Dalel Singh (king) =

- Maharaja

Maharaja of Ramgarh
- Reign: 1677–1724 CE
- Predecessor: Ram Singh II
- Successor: Bishan Singh
- Born: Badam
- Died: 1724 CE; Ramgarh
- House: Ramgarh Raj
- Father: Ram Singh
- Religion: Hinduism

Dalel Singh was the king of Karnpura during the 17th century. He shifted his capital from Badam in Barkagaon, which is now in Hazaribagh district, to Ramgarh in 1670 and family has used Ramgarh in official and other work after changing their capitals to other place.

He built a huge palace for protection from the Mughal Empire. He shifted his capital from Badam to Ramgarh for protection from Mughal invasion. He had built famous Kaitha Shiv Mandir dedicated to Lord Shiva in Kaitha, Ramgarh. Temple has been declared as National Monument in 2016. He was also a poet and wrote a book named Shiv Sagar.

Chero king of Palamu Jaikishan Rai and Dalel Singh captured the Tori which was in possession of Nagvanshi. Jaikishan Rai attacked Ramgarh as Dalel Singh gave shelter to Ranjit Rai. Dalel Singh died in battle. Then a descendant of Dalel Singh invaded and captured Palamu.
