= Rajkumar Udaybhan Narain Singh =

Udaybhan Narain Singh
- 'Titular' Rajkumar of Ramgarh Raj

Member of Ramgarh Raj family
- Predecessor: Maharaj Kumar Mayurdhwaja Narain Singh G.S.S.
- Heir apparent: Rajkumar Rudra Narain Singh
- Born: 4 December 1973 (age 52); New Delhi
- Spouse: Kunwarani Divya Devi Singh
- Issue: Rajkumar Rudra Narain Singh
- House: Narain
- Father: Maharaj Kumar Mayurdhwaja Narain Singh G.S.S.
- Mother: Mahakunwarani Shashi Prabha Singh
- Religion: Hinduism

Udaybhan Narain Singh (born 4 December 1973 in New Delhi, India) is an Indian politician who was the Independent Director of JIADA (Jharkhand Industrial Area Development Authority) in the Government of Jharkhand and was one of the leaders of the Jharkhand Vikas Morcha but later joined Bhartiya Janta Party in 2013. Being close to Rajnath Singh, gained popularity in the party also. Belongs to the erstwhile royal family of Ramgarh Raj and has a strong hold over the North Chotanagpur belt (Chatra, Hazaribagh, etc). Singh is grandson of Maharaj Kumar Dr. Basant Narain Singh who served as 4 times MP from Hazaribagh aur also 2 times MLA from Hazaribagh.
