= Shashank Manjari =

- Maharani of Ramgarh Raj

Member of Narain Raj Parivar - Ramgarh Raj
- Period: 1899 – 29 January 1987
- Predecessor: Maharani Rikinath Kauri
- Successor: Maharani Lalita Rajya Lakshmi
- Born: 20 June 1899; Porahat Palace, Chakardharpur, Bihar, British India
- Died: 29 January 1987 (aged 87); Raja Kothi Hazaribagh
- Spouse: Maharaja Lakshmi Narain Singh Bahadur
- Issue: Maharaja Kamakhya Narain Singh Bahadur, Lt.Col.Dr. Maharaj Kumar Basant Narain Singh Ji Sahib
- House: Narain
- Father: H.H. Maharaja Shri Narpath Singh of Porahat
- Religion: Hinduism

Maharani Shashank Manjari Devi Sahiba was an Indian politician. She was elected to the Lok Sabha, lower house of the Parliament of India from Palamu, Bihar as a member of the Swatantra Party. She belonged to the erstwhile royal family (Narain Raj Parivar) of Ramgarh Raj and was also the granddaughter of H.H. Maharaja Shri Raja Arjun Singh of Porahat. She was married to Maharaja Lakshmi Narain Singh Bahadur of Ramgarh Raj. She was also a M.L.A. from Jaridhi Vidhan Sabha and Dumri Vidhan Sabha for three terms and was also the irrigation minister of Bihar during 1969. She was regarded as one of the most powerful women of India as she never lost a singh election in her entire life.
