= Chota Nagpur Santhal Parganas Janata Party =

- Abbreviation: CNSPJP
- Founder: Kamakhya Narain Singh
- ECI Status: Former Party

The Chota Nagpur Santhal Parganas Janata Party (CNSPJP) was a political party in Bihar state in India founded by the Maharaja Bahadur of Ramgarh, Kamakhya Narain Singh.

== History ==
In the 1951–52 general elections the party nominated six candidates. It received 236,094 votes and won one seat, with Ram Narayan Singh elected in Hazaribagh West. In the 1952 Bihar Legislative Assembly elections it won eleven seats.

In the 1957 general elections the party nominated 13 candidates, received 501,359 votes and won three seats; Lalita Rajya Lakshmi in Hazaribagh, Quazi S. A. Matin in Giridih and Vijaya Raje in Chatra. In the Bihar Legislative Assembly elections in the same year it won 23 seats.
