= Topas =

Topas may refer to:

- Topas, Salamanca, a municipality in Spain
- Tópas, a confection produced by the Icelandic company Nói Síríus
- OT-62 TOPAS, a Polish/Czechoslovak series of amphibious tracked armoured personnel carriers
- Topas, an apprentice in a lascar ship's crew
- TOPAS, a software package used in the analysis of powder diffraction data

== See also ==
- Topass, a Portuguese ethnicity in the Indian Ocean
- Topa, a census town in Hazaribag district in the Indian state of Jharkhand
- Topa River, a tributary of the Holod River in Romania
- Sir Thopas, a fictional character in The Canterbury Tales by Geoffrey Chaucer
