= Ramgarh Raj =

Zamindari estate

- 1368–1953
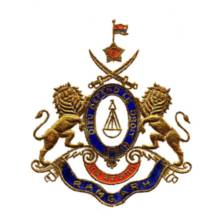
- Coat of arms
- Status: Sovereign monarchy (1368 – 16th century); Tributary state of the Mughal Empire (16th century–1772); Tributary state of the British East India Company (1772–1858) and British India (1858–1947)
- Capital: Urda (1368–1642); Badam (1642–1670); Ramgarh (1670–1772); Ichak (1772–1873); Padma; (1873–1952)
- Common languages: Magahi, Khortha
- Religion: Hinduism
- Government: Monarchy
- Raja (King or Chief)
  - 1368–1402: Baghdeo Singh (first)
  - 1919–1953: Kamakhya Narain Singh (last)
- History
  - Established: 1368
  - Disestablished: 1953
Preceded by	Succeeded by
Nagvanshis of Chotanagpur	Republic of India
- Today part of: India

Ramgarh Raj was the major Zamindari estate in the era of the British Raj in the former Indian province of Jharkahnd. Territories which comprised the Ramgarh Raj presently constitute districts of Ramgarh, Hazaribagh, Chatra, Giridih, Koderma, and Bokaro with 3672 villages. The entire area is rich in minerals like coal and mica and falls under the Indian State of Jharkhand. The First King was Maharaja Baghdeo Singh and the last ruling king was Maharaja Kamakhya Narain Singh of this estate, until the estate was merged to the Republic of India. The revenue of the estate was about 3600000.

== History ==
The areas that would later comprise the Ramgarh Raj (estate) had initially belonged to the Raja of Chhota Nagpur. Around 14th century Ghatwar King of Karnpura Karpurdeo rebelled against Nagvanshi Kings. Baghdeo suppressed rebellion, killed the King of Karnpura. Nagvanshi king sought help of Baghdeo Singh and his brother Singhdeo Singh. The ancestors of the Ramgarh rulers were Rathore Rajputs who traced their descent for Maharaja Manikchand, brother of Maharaja Jayachandra of Kannauj. They came from Khairagarh Kantit which is located in present day Allahabad district of Uttar Pradesh. Baghdeo Singh, who was anyway in control of the area after quelling rebellion, simply stayed on and declared himself Raja of that area, which is said to have been 22 parganas (districts) in extent.

During 17th century, Dalel Singh built a palace for defence against the Mughal Empire and shifted his capital from Badam to Ramgarh. He built Kaitha Shiv Mandir dedicated to Lord Shiva in Kaitha, Ramgarh which was declared as a National Monument in 2016. He also wrote a book named Shiv Sagar.

During rule of Mughal Empire, Ramgarh Raj was paying tributes to Mughal. In 1772, Mukund Singh was not accepted suzerainty of East India company due to high amount of taxes. He made alliance with Maratha and defeated forces of Tej Singh Thakurai, Nagvanshis and Palamu with the help of Maratha forces. But later he surrendered before company forces as he didn't get help from Maratha and accepted suzerainty of the East India Company. Then Tej Singh Thakurai was made king of Ramgarh Raj by Company.

Maharaja Bahadur Kamakhya Narain Singh (b. 1916, ruled 1919–47, d.1970) was the last ruling chief of the Ramgarh Raj. In 1945, he ceded control to the Indian government. His son, Maharaja Bahadur Indra Jitendra Narain Singh (1938–2008) had been the head of the family from 1970 to 2008. Maharaja Bahadur Saurabh Narain Singh has been head of family from 2008.

== Rulers ==
Following is the list of King of Ramgarh Raj.

- Maharaja Baghdeo Singh 1368–1402
- Maharaja Kirat Singh 1402–1459
- Maharaja Ram Singh I 1459–1537
- Maharaja Madho Singh 1537–1554
- Maharaja Jagat Singh 1554–1604
- Maharaja Himmat Singh 1604–1661
- Maharaja Ram Singh II 1661–1677
- Maharaja Dalel Singh 1677–1724
- Maharaja Bishan Singh 1724–1763
- Maharaja Mukund Singh 1763–1772
- Maharaja Tej Singh 1772–1774
- Maharaja Paras Nath Singh 1774–1784
- Maharaja Mani Nath Singh 1784–1811
- Maharaja Sidh Nath Singh 1811–1835
- Maharaja Lakshmi Nath Singh 1835–1841
- Maharaja Shambhu Nath Singh 1841–1862
- Maharaja Ram Nath Singh 1862-1866
- Maharaja Trilok Nath Singh 1866
- Maharaja Nam Narain Singh 1866–1899
- Maharaja a Ram Narain Singh 1899–1913
- Maharaja Lakshmi Narain Singh 1913–1919
- Maharaja Kamakhya Narain Singh Bahadur 1919–1953 (+1970)

== Erstwhile Ruling Family Genealogy ==
- Maharaja a Lakshmi Narain Singh, married Rajmata Shashank Manjari Devi, 1914, a daughter of Raja Narpat Singh of Porahat
  - Maharaja Kamakhya Narain Singh, married Maharani Lalita Rajya Lakshmi Devi, 26 February 1917, daughter of Supradipta Manyabara Lt.Gen. Maharajkumar Singha Shumsher Jung Bahadur Rana of Nepal
    - Maharaja Indrajitendra Narain Singh, married Maharani Rewa Singh, daughter of Raja Dinesh Singh of Kalakankar
      - Maharaja Saurabh Narain Singh Bahadur married, Maharani Ujvala Prabha
      - Rajkumar Vaibhav Narain Singh
  - Lt.Col.Dr. Maharajkumar Basant Narain Singh Bahadur, married Kunwarani Vijaya Raje Sahiba
    - Maharajkumar Mayurdhwaja Narain Singh, married Kunwarani Nivedita Shashi Prabha Singh
      - Rajkumar Udaybhan Narain Singh, married Kunwarani Divya Devi Singh
        - Rajkumar Rudra Narain Singh
      - Rajkumar Adhiraj Narain Singh, married Kunwarani Devyani Singh
