= Kamakhya Narain Singh =

Indian politician

- Maharaja Bahadur of Ramgarh Raj

Ramgarh Raj
- Period: 1919 – 7 May 1970
- Predecessor: Maharaja Lakshmi Narain Singh
- Born: 10 August 1916; Padma, Ramgarh Raj, India
- Died: 7 May 1970 (aged 53); Kolkata
- Spouse: Maharani Lalita Rajya Lakshmi
- Father: Maharaja Lakshmi Narain Singh Bahadur
- Mother: Rajmata Shashank Manjari Devi
- Religion: Hinduism

Maharaja Kamakhya Narain Singh Bahadur (10 August 1916 – 7 May 1970) of Ramgarh, Jharkhand was the Maharaja Bahadur of Ramgarh Raj and later a politician. He belonged to the Rathore clan of Rajput.

== Early life and family ==
He was educated at Rajkumar College, Raipur and at Mayo College, Ajmer. He became the Raja of Ramgarh in 1919 upon death of his father, Raja Lakshmi Narain Singh. He was married to Maharani Lalita Rajya Lakshmi Devi, daughter of Supradipta Manyabara Lt. Gen. Maharajkumar Singha Shumsher Jung Bahadur Rana of Nepal in 1936. They had a son, Indra Jitendra Narain Singh.

== Career ==
He formed his own political party called the Chota Nagpur Santhal Parganas Janata Party and was a prominent leader in Bihar at that time. His family was the first family in India to use helicopters in election campaign. He served as the vice-president of the Bihar Landholder's Association. He served as president of Akhil Bharatiya Kshatriya Mahasabha in 1942 and 1953. He was also Member of the Managing Committee and General Council of Rajkumar College; Member of the Executive Body of the Bihar War Committee.

Immediately after assuming charge of Ramgarh Raj in August 1937, he diverted his full attention to the interest of estate and his manifold benevolent activities became extremely popular among his subjects. He tried to keep himself in direct touch with all his subjects especially poorer section and was accessible to all. He mostly visited interior parts of his estate and everytime inaugurated some new scheme to foster the growth of a healthy and progressive peasantry.During his tenure, Ramgarh Raj has made good progress in all directions and brought a remarkable change in the life of Ramgarh people. In 1944, he waived the taxes of farmers.

With the wish of freedom fighter Babu Ram Narayan Singh popularly known as "Chhotanagpur Kesari" and efforts of Dr. Rajendra Prasad the historic 53rd Session of INC was held at Ramgarh in he contribution whole heartedly to the success of this session.Even the important Congress leader were full of praise at cordial relations existing between the Maharaja and his subjects. In same year, Netaji Subhash Chandra Bose left Congress and held Samantar Adhiveshan which was supported by Maharaja Saheb and local zamindar Gorinath Singh. In 1946, he left Congress due to differences with Pt Jawaharlal Nehru and formed his own political party Chota Nagpur Santhal Parganas Janata Party.He entered politics in 1946 following the formal accession of the Ramgarh state into the Indian Republic. In 1952 Bihar Assembly elections, he contested from Dhanbad as a candidate of Swatantra Party but was defeated by a noted freedom-fighter and labor rights leader, Purushottam K. Chauhan of Congress Party. In late 1960s, Kamakhya Narayan Singh was popularly an aspirant for Rajput supremacy in Bihar against Rajput stalwart, Sri Satyendra Narayan Sinha (then known as "Coming Chief Minister of Bihar") but was outmanoeuvred. His party later merged with the Swatantra Party. Many of his family members became important political functionaries and legislators.

He joined the Congress in 1966 but left soon due to opposition from KB Sahay.

Later in the Bihar Assembly Elections of 1967, serious opposition was offered by the Raja Bahadur's Jan Kranti Dal to the ruling Congress government and He was instrumental in making Mahamaya Prasad Sinha, Chief Minister of Bihar, although SSP leader Karpoori Thakur had a better stake in the post of Chief Minister. The Raja Bahadur and his younger brother, Dr. Basant Narain Singh, became Cabinet Ministers in the government. However, the government couldn't last even for a year. He again became minister in Bhola Paswan Shastri's ministry, but withdrew support leading to fall of the government.

He revived his Janata Party which won 14 seats in 1969 bihar elections. He again became a minister in Harihar Singh cabinet but the government lost majority when Shoshit Dal withdrew support primarily on allegations of Raja pressuring the government to withdraw old cases against him.

== Last days and death ==
Singh died of cardiac arrest at 12:25 a.m. (IST) on 7 May 1970 at his residence in Calcutta. In the days preceding his death, he had complained of an abdomen problem. He was cremated on the banks of a river two miles from his Padma, his place of birth near Hazaribagh in Bihar (today in Jharkhand).
