= Basant Narain Singh =

- Maharaj Kumar of Ramgarh Raj

Ramgarh Raj
- Period: 1918 – 3 February 1984
- Predecessor: Maharaj Kumar Rameshwar Narain Singh
- Successor: Maharaj Kumar M. Narain Singh Gazi Sarkar Sahib
- Born: 9 April 1918; Padhma Palace, Ramgarh Raj, India
- Died: 3 February 1984 (aged 65); Hazaribagh, Bihar
- Spouse: Kunwarani Vijaya Raje
- Issue: Maharaj Kumar M. Narain Singh Gazi Sarkar Sahib and Kunwarani Bhavna Raje
- Father: Maharaja Lakshmi Narain Singh Bahadur
- Mother: Maharajmata Shashank Manjiri Devi
- Religion: Hinduism

Maharaj Kumar Dr. Basant Narain Singh (b. at Padma Lakshmi Nivas Palace, Hazaribagh District, April 9, 1918) was an Indian politician and a member of the 7th Lok Sabha representing Hazaribagh (Lok Sabha constituency) of Bihar State.

== Education and career ==
Singh was educated at Rajkumar College, Raipur and at Mayo College, Ajmer.

He was also elected as a member of the 3rd, 4th, and 6th Lok Sabha of the Indian Parliament. He was a member of the Bihar State Legislative Assembly during 1952-62 and 1967–74 and Cabinet Minister in Bihar from 1967 to 1972 holding various portfolios such as forest, excise, jail, revenue, public works, and irrigation. He was the general secretary of the Janta Party which was formed by Maharaja of Ramgarh Raj.

== Personal life and family ==
He belonged to the royal family of Ramgarh Raj. He married Kuwarani Vijaya Raje, the daughter of H.R.H. Maharaja Sir Udaji Rao II Parmar (Honorary A.D.C. to King of England) of Dhar State. They had two children, Maharaj Kumar Mayurdhwaja Narain Singh Gaji Sarkar Sahib and Kuwarani Bhawna Raje. Their residence was at Raja Kothi in Hazaribagh.

He was the younger brother of Maharaja Kamakhya Narain Singh Bahadur of Ramgarh Raj, son of the late Raja Lakshmi Narain Singh Bahadur and maternal great-grandson of Maharaja Raja Arjun Singh (freedom fighter) of Porahat Raj (Kolhan Estate).
