= Mukund Singh =

- Raja

Raja of Ramgarh
- Reign: c.1763–1772 CE
- Predecessor: Bishan Singh
- Successor: Tej Singh Thakurai
- Born: Ramgarh
- Dynasty: Ramgarh Raj
- Religion: Hinduism

Mukund Singh was king of Ramgarh in 18th century India. He succeeded Bishan Singh. He ruled from 1763 to 1772 CE. He had made alliance with Maratha against East India Company. He defeated forces of claimant king of Ramgarh, Tej Singh Thakurai, Nagvanshis and Palamu. But In 1772, he accepted suzerainty of the East India Company as he didn't get support of Maratha in battle against East India Company. Then he disposabed from throne and Tej Singh Thakurai became new king of Ramgarh.

Mukund Singh previously supported Captain Jabcob of East India Company in conquering Palamu. He also attacked the Zamindars of six neighbouring Pargana. All were ready to assist the East India Company against Mukund Singh. Mukund Singh was not ready to accept suzerainty of East India Company, but he accepted to pay tribute to East India Company. Company ordered Mukund Singh to pay 63000 rupee in three year and 23,228 rupee of previous payment. This tax was more than other estates and he was not in a state to pay such a huge amount, so he refused to obey the order of Company. He sought help of the Marathas against East India Company. Maratha detached a force to Ramgarh. Many other kings such as Tori, Kunda and Kendi came in support of him. They prepared to face the Company force.

Knowing about this alliance, Captain Jacob attacked Kunda and conquered Kunda. King of Kendi accepted to pay tribute to Company by fear. Jacob declared Tej Singh Thakurai as new king of Ramgarh. He gave him leadership to lead the battle. The joint forces of Tej Singh, Nagvanshis, Chero of Palamu attacked Ramgarh and Mukund Singh got anxious. But In front of Maratha forces the forces of opponents were proved ineffective and Tej Singh Thakurai had to flee from the battle. The fear of Mukund Singh slowly disappeared with the result of battle and anxiety of East India company grow.

Patna council of East India company ordered Captain Jacob to defeat Ramgarh. Captain Jacob recalled Tej Singh Thakurai and with large company forces attacked Ramgarh. Due to some reason Maratha forces didn't able help Mukund Singh. Later Mukund Singh surrendered without battle and accepted suzerainty of East India company. Then East India Company disposed him from throne and made Tej Singh Thakurai new king of Ramgarh.
