= Baghdeo Singh =

Rajput King

- Raja

Raja of Karnpura
- Reign: 14th century
- Successor: Kirat Singh
- Dynasty: Ramgarh Raj
- Religion: Hinduism

Baghdeo Singh was founder of Ramgarh Raj in North Chotanagpur. He was descendant of Maharaja Manikchand, brother of Maharaja Jayachandra of Kannauj. He was made Fauzdar of Karra under the Nagvanshi. He suppressed rebellion in Tamar for Nagvanshi ruler. Nagvanshi send him to extract taxes from Karpurdeo the king of Karnpura. Baghdeo killed Karpurdeo and he declared himself as the King of that region.

Baghdeo defeated king of Kapardeo and killed him. He also destroyed their fort Mahudigarh. Baghdeo Singh, who was anyway in control of the area after quelling rebellion, simply stayed on and declared himself Raja of that area, which is said to have been 22 parganas (districts) in extent.
