= Kuju Area =

- Location in Jharkhand Kuju Area (India)
- Location: West Bokaro Coalfield; 23.7203°N 85.5028°E
- Company: Central Coalfields Limited
- Website: centralcoalfields.in/cmpny/hstry.php

Kuju Area is one of the operational areas of the Central Coalfields Limited located mainly in the Ramgarh district in the state of Jharkhand, India.

== Projects and area office ==
The projects of the Kuju Area are: Saruberia underground, Saruberia opencast, Ara open cast, Kuju underground, Topa underground, Topa open cast, Pindra underground, Pindra open cast, Pundi open cast, Karma open cast. The area office is at Hesagarha, Kuju 825316.

== Mining activity ==
Collieries in the CCL Kuju Area (West Bokaro Coalfield)
U: Underground colliery, O: Open Cast colliery, M: Mixed colliery, W: Washery, S: Facility, A: Administrative headquarters, CT: census town
Owing to space constraints in the small map, the actual locations in a larger map may vary slightly

=== Mines and projects ===
Mourpa, Kuju, Hesagora and Banwar collieries were regrouped in 1973 after nationalisation of the coal industry in a single unit named Kuju colliery. Mining was carried out in a number of sections by underground and opencast systems. In 2016-17 the total production from the mine was 5,526 tonnes. As of 2017, all underground mines were closed. As of 31/3/2017, the total mineable reserve in 5 seams (XIII, XII, XI, XA, X) was 9.03 million tonnes. The Kuju opencast project has been planned for a nominal production capacity of 1.30 million tonnes per year of coal and peak production 1.50 million tonnes of coal. The project will sustain a quarry life of eight years. Feasibility of extracting coal up to 140 metres (460 ft) depth including developed area of underground workings by opencast method is studied and it is found technically feasible to convert the underground mine to opencast mine up to seam X.

The Karma opencast project will have, as in 2010, a normal production of 1.0 million tonnes per year and a peak production of 1.2 million tonnes per year. The life of the project was estimated to be 26 years. The project is located on the bank of the Damodar River and a protective embankment was planned.

== Illegal mining activities ==
According to the Report on Prevention of Illegal Coal Mining and Theft, “The main source of illegal mining of coal and theft is abandoned mines. After economic extraction is over, the remaining coal in an abandoned mine is stolen by coal mafias, villagers leading to roof falling, water flooding, poisonous gas leaking, leading to the death of many labourers.” In the Kuju Area of CCL illegal mining activities are taking place in Pindra, Topa, Ara and Saruberia non-working mines, and Kuju-Morpa, Banwar, Pundri non-working quarries. Illegal mining also takes place in the fringe areas and outside the leasehold areas of CCL.

Cities, towns and locations in Ramgarh district in North Chotanagpur Division
M: municipality, CT: census town, R: rural/ urban centre, T: tourist centre, P: power plant
Abbreviation used- TPP: thermal power project
Owing to space constraints in the small map, the actual locations in a larger map may vary slightly

== Educational facilities for employees’ children ==
Central Coalfields Limited provides support for reputed institutions/ trusts for setting up 10+2 pattern CBSE schools for children of CCL employees. It provides 109 buses to employees' children to schools and back. Among the schools in the West Bokaro Coalfield that receive financial help or structural support are: DAV Ara, Kuju, DAV Kedla, DAV Taping, DAV Topa.

== Medical facilities ==
In the West Bokaro Coalfield, CCL has the following facilities:

S.C.Taping Regional Hospital at Premnagar, Taping with 20 beds, has 1 general duty medical officer. Among the facilities it has are: x-ray, laboratory. It has 1 ambulance.

JRH Kedla Colliery Hospital at Kedla has 32 beds.

There are central facilities in the Central Hospital, Gandhinagar at Kanke Road, Ranchi with 250 beds and in the Central Hospital, Naisarai at Ramgarh with 150 beds.

There are dispensaries at GM unit, Topa, Saruberia composite and Kuju colliery in the Kuju Area, and GM Unit and Jharkhand in the Hazaribagh Area.

Note: For Hazaribagh district map please see Hazaribagh Area
