= Padma, Hazaribagh =

Padma
- Village
- Location in Jharkhand, India Padma (India)
- Coordinates: 24.2113°N 85.3624°E
- Country: India
- State: Jharkhand
- District: Hazaribagh
- Elevation: 398 m (1,306 ft)

Population (2011)
  - Total: 7,896

Languages (*For language details see Padma, Hazaribagh (community development block)#Language and religion)
  - Official: Hindi, Urdu
- Time zone: UTC+5:30 (IST)
- PIN: 825411 (Padma)
- Telephone/ STD code: 06543
- Vehicle registration: JH 02
- Website: hazaribag.nic.in

Padma is a village in the Padma CD block in the Barhi subdivision of the Hazaribagh district in the Indian state of Jharkhand. Padma is historically known for the Padma Fort (also called Padma Kila or Hawamahal), which served as the seat of the Ramgarh Raj family during the British Raj. The estate was largely managed by Bhumihar Zamindar families, who played a significant role in local administration and revenue collection in Hazaribagh region.

== History ==
The Padma Palace (also referred to as Padma Fort) of Ramgarh Raj is located at Padma. The Shivgarh gate is one of its main attractions. There is a photo gallery displaying the history of Ramgarh Raj. The erstwhile estate now houses a police academy. The boundary wall and the main gate are on the Patna-Ranchi highway. This is the reaction of a boy, travelling in a bus, looking at the compound wall: "This wall is not like those that people in the town surround their homes with: it's sculpted, carved and carries little domes on its pillars. In all fairness, it looks heartbreakingly ancient, and the boy wonders if respectable grandeur is always a property of the past."

== Geography ==
Cities, towns and locations in Hazaribagh district in North Chotanagpur Division
Some census towns and locations around Hazaribagh city are shown on the Hazaribagh City map.
M: municipality, CT: census town, R: rural/urban centre, T: tourist centre, D: dam, HS: hot spring.
Owing to space constraints in the small map, the actual locations in a larger map may vary slightly.

=== Location ===
Padma is located at 24.2113°N 85.3624°E.

Hazaribag Wildlife Sanctuary is 5 kilometres (3.1 mi) from Padma.

=== Area overview ===
Hazaribagh district is a plateau area and forests occupy around about 45% of the total area. It is a predominantly rural area with 92.34% of the population living in rural areas against 7.66% in the urban areas. There are many census towns in the district, as can be seen in the map alongside. Agriculture is the main occupation of the people but with the extension of coal mines, particularly in the southern part of the district, employment in coal mines is increasing. However, it has to be borne in mind that modern mining operations are highly mechanised. Four operational areas of Central Coalfields are marked on the map. All these areas are spread across partly this district and partly the neighbouring districts.

Note: The map alongside presents some of the notable locations in the district. All places marked in the map are linked in the larger full screen map. Urbanisation data calculated on the basis of census data for CD blocks and may vary a little against unpublished official data.

== Civic administration ==
=== Police outpost ===
Padma police outpost serves the Padma CD block.

=== CD block HQ ===
The headquarters of Padma CD block are located at Padma.

== Demographics ==
According to the 2011 Census of India, Padma had a total population of 7,896, of which 4,326 (55%) were males and 3,570 (45%) were females. Population in the age range 0-6 years was 1,113. The total number of literate persons in Padma was 5,340 (78.73% of the population over 6 years).

== Transport ==
There is a railway station at Padma on the Koderma-Hazaribagh-Barkakana-Ranchi line.

Padma is on the National Highway 20. The Padma-Itkhori Road links Padma to Itkhori.
