= Vijaya Raje =

- Kunwarani of Ramgarh Raj

Member of Narain Raj Parivar – Ramgarh Raj
- Dhar State: 16 September 1919 – 12 December 1995
- Predecessor: Maharajmata Shashank Manjiri Devi
- Successor: Kunwarani Shashi Prabha Singh
- Born: 16 September 1919; Dhar, India
- Died: 21 December 1995 (aged 76); Hazaribagh
- House: Narain
- Religion: Hinduism

Vijaya Raje (16 September 1919, in Dhar – 21 December 1995) was a member of royal family from Ramgarh in Hazaribagh district of Bihar State of India.

She was member of the 1st Rajya Sabha during 1952–1957 from Bihar State of the Janta Party of Ramgarh Raj. Later she was elected to Lok Sabha from Chatra (Lok Sabha constituency) of Bihar State in 1957, 1962 and 1967 for 2nd, 3rd and 4th Lok Sabha.
