= Kuju, Ramgarh =

Kuju
- Census Town
- Location in Jharkhand, India Kuju (India)
- Coordinates: 23.72°N 85.5°E
- Country: India
- State: Jharkhand
- District: Ramgarh

Area
  - Total: 13.483 km^{2} (5.206 sq mi)
- Elevation: 426 m (1,398 ft)

Population (2011)
  - Total: 21,356
  - Density: 1,583.9/km^{2} (4,102.3/sq mi)

Languages (*For language details see Mandu (community development block)#Language and religion)
  - Official: Hindi, Urdu
- Time zone: UTC+5:30 (IST)
- PIN: 829150
- Telephone/ STD code: 06545
- Vehicle registration: JH
- Lok Sabha constituency: Hazaribagh
- Vidhan Sabha constituency: Mandu
- Website: ramgarh.nic.in

Kuju is a census town in the Mandu CD block in the Ramgarh subdivision of the Ramgarh district in the Indian state of Jharkhand.

== Geography ==
Cities, towns and locations in Ramgarh district in North Chotanagpur Division
M: municipality, CT: census town, R: rural/ urban centre, T: tourist centre, P: power plant
Abbreviation used- TPP: thermal power project
Owing to space constraints in the small map, the actual locations in a larger map may vary slightly

=== Location ===
Kuju is located at 23.72°N 85.5°E. It has an average elevation of 426 metres (1397 feet).

=== Area overview ===
Ramgarh has a coal-mining sector. The map alongside provides links to five operational areas of Central Coalfields spread across South Karanpura Coalfield, Ramgarh Coalfield and West Bokaro Coalfield. Four of the six CD blocks in the district have coal mines – Patratu, Ramgarh, Mandu and Chitarpur. The high concentration of census towns in these blocks are noticeable on the map. Only two blocks, Gola and Dulmi, are totally rural areas. Ramgarh district lies in the central part of the Chota Nagpur Plateau. The Damodar valley covers most of the district. The forested areas in highlands to the north and the south of the valley can be seen in the map (mark the shaded areas). "Chotanagpur has a charm of its own… The entire area forms one of the most charming series of views imaginable. The far-off hills in the background in exquisite tints of blue or purple as the light falls, the nearer hills picturesquely shaped and luxuriant in every shade of green with their bold escarpments in black or grey, and the brown plains below furnishing their quota of colours."

Note: The map alongside presents some of the notable locations in the district. All places marked in the map are linked in the larger full screen map.

== Demographics ==
According to the 2011 Census of India, Kuju had a total population of 21,356, of which 11,246 (53%) were males and 10,110 (47%) were females. Population in the age range 0-6 years was 3,123. The total number of literate persons in Kuju was 14,365 (78.79% of the population over 6 years).

As of 2001 India census, Kuju had a population of 18,049. Males constitute 54% of the population and females 46%. Kuju has an average literacy rate of 60%, higher than the national average of 59.5%: male literacy is 69%, and female literacy is 50%. In Kuju, 15% of the population is under 6 years of age.

== Civic administration ==
There is a Police Outpost at Kuju.

== Infrastructure ==
According to the District Census Handbook 2011, Ramgarh, Kuju covered an area of 13.483 km^{2}. Among the civic amenities, it had 10 km roads with open drains, the protected water supply involved uncovered wells, hand pumps. It had 3,526 domestic electric connections, 10 road lighting points. Among the medical facilities, it had 1 hospital, 2 dispensaries, 2 health centres, 1 family welfare centre, 11 maternity and child welfare centres, 11 maternity homes, 5 nursing homes, 14 medicine shops. Among the educational facilities it had 8 primary schools, 5 middle schools, 2 secondary schools, 1 senior secondary school, the nearest general degree college at Ramgarh Cantonment 11 km away. It had 6 non-formal educational centres (Sarva Siksha Abhiyan). Among the social, recreational and cultural facilities it had 1 stadium, 1 auditorium/ community hall. Three important commodities it produced were coal, chuna, spunz. It had the branch offices of 3 nationalised banks, 1 agricultural credit society, 1 non-agricultural credit society.

== Economy ==
Projects in the Kuju Area of Central Coalfields Limited (as in 2015) were: Surubera Underground and Open Cast, Ara OC, Kuju UG, Topa UG & OC, Pindra UG & OC, Pundi OC and Karma OC.

== Transport ==
There is a station at Kuju on the Koderma–Hazaribagh–Barkakana–Ranchi line.

Kuju is on National Highway 33.

== Healthcare ==
Medistyle pain clinic & diagnostics located on the Main Road is integral healthcare service provider in the region.

== Famous people ==
In Kuju, there are prominent people, famous, amongst the locals.

- Indra Prasad Gupta.
- Baijnath Prasad Gupta
- Kishori Lal Mehta
- Lalit Narayan Mishra
- Ramkant Jha
- Sunil Kumar Singh

IP Gupta is famous amongst the locals, for --

"Solving the dispute amongst people, and being good at his work."

BP Gupta is famous amongst the locals for creating a girls' school, for underprivileged girls.

Kishori Lala Mehta was an Indian Independence activist, and politician. He was alive from 1888 - 1965. He was part of the Quit India Movement.

Remakant Jha was an Indian politician, and was born in 1945, and is currently the Member of Parliament for Ramgarh.

Sunil Kumar Singh is an Indian Politician, and Lawyer. He was born in Kuju in 1955, and is currently the Member of the Legislative Assembly for Kuju.
