= Kaitha village =

Kaitha is a village in Ramgarh district of Jharkhand state of India.
