= Ramgarh district =

Coordinates: 23°37′12″N 85°31′12″E

- District of Jharkhand
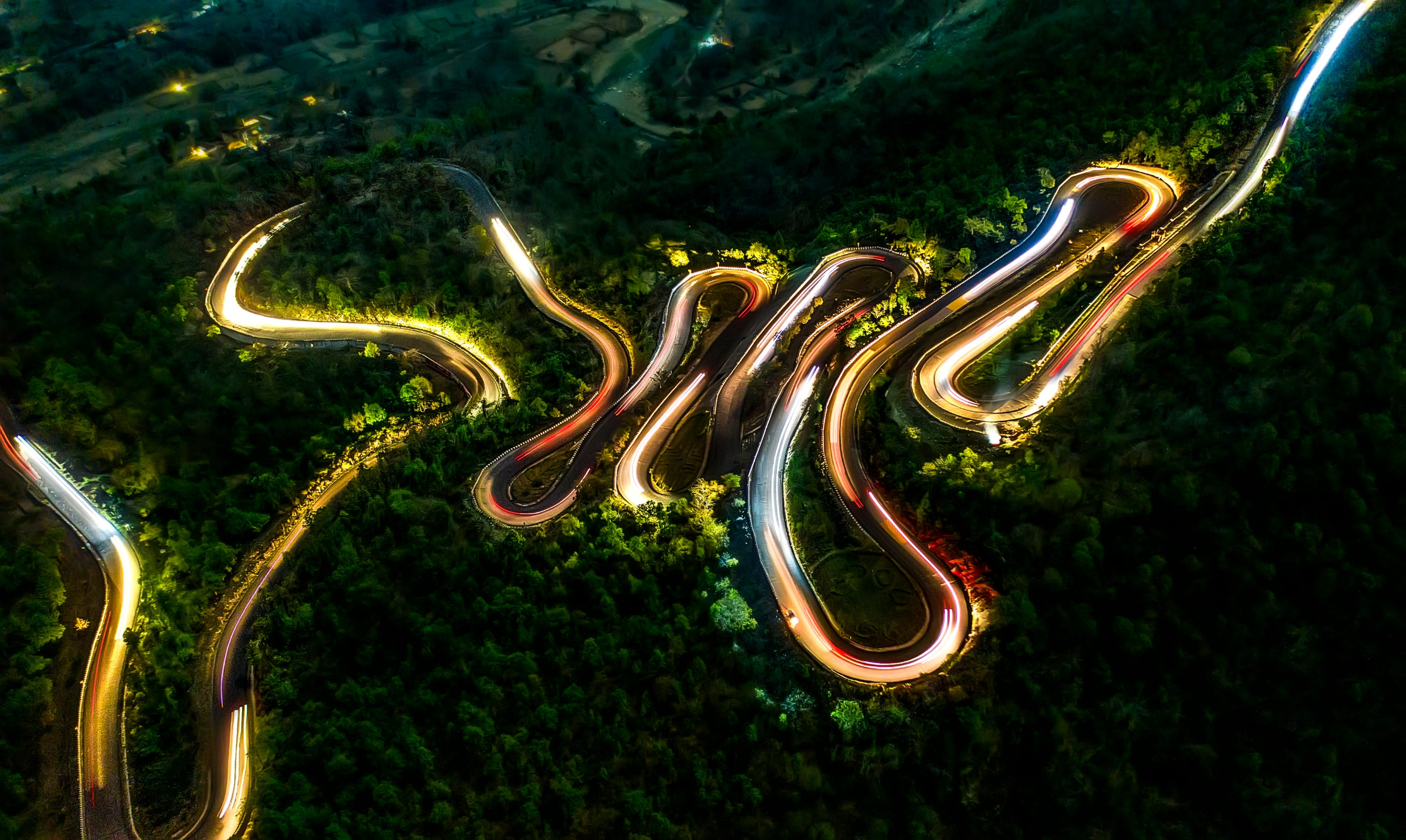
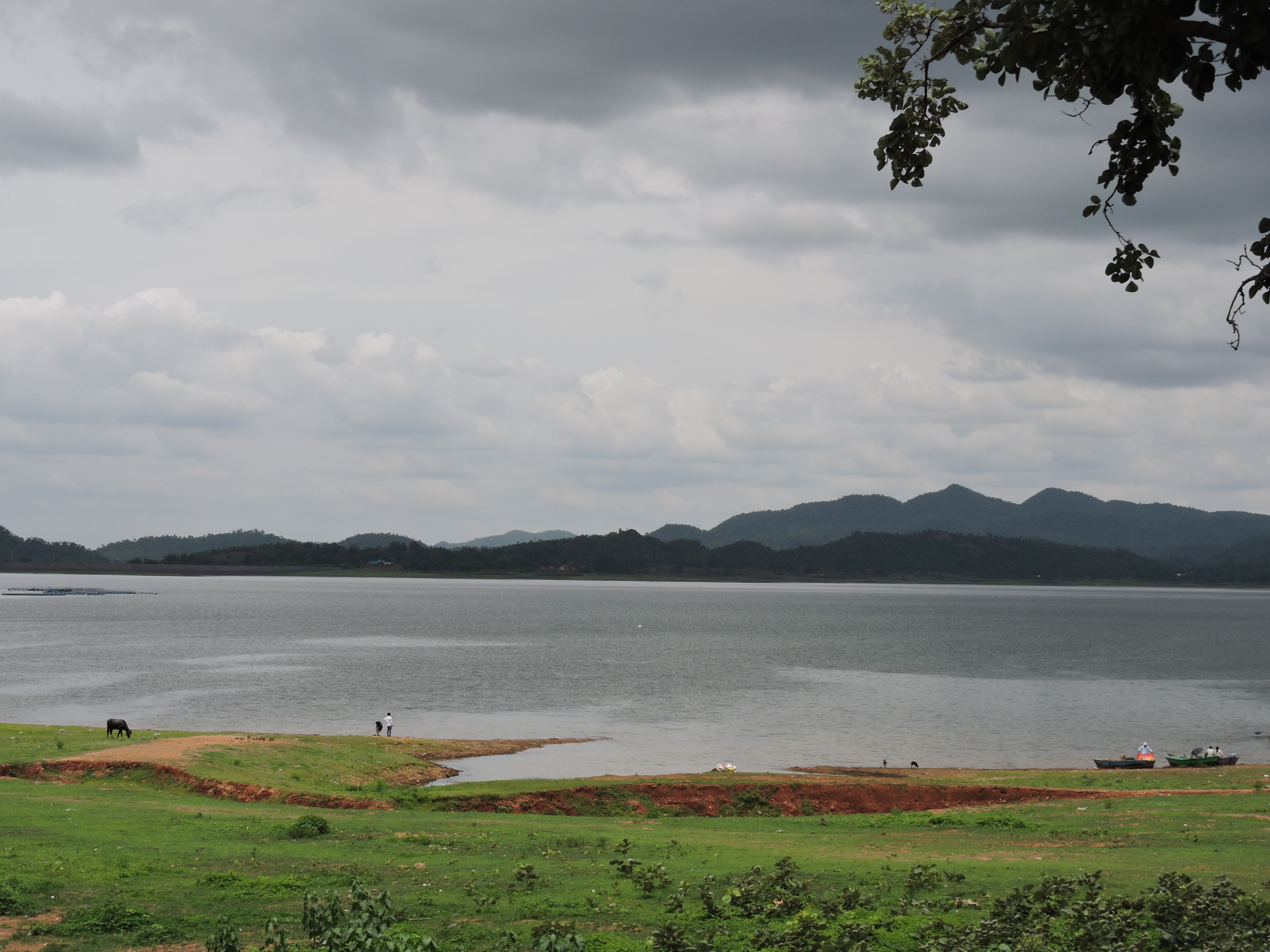
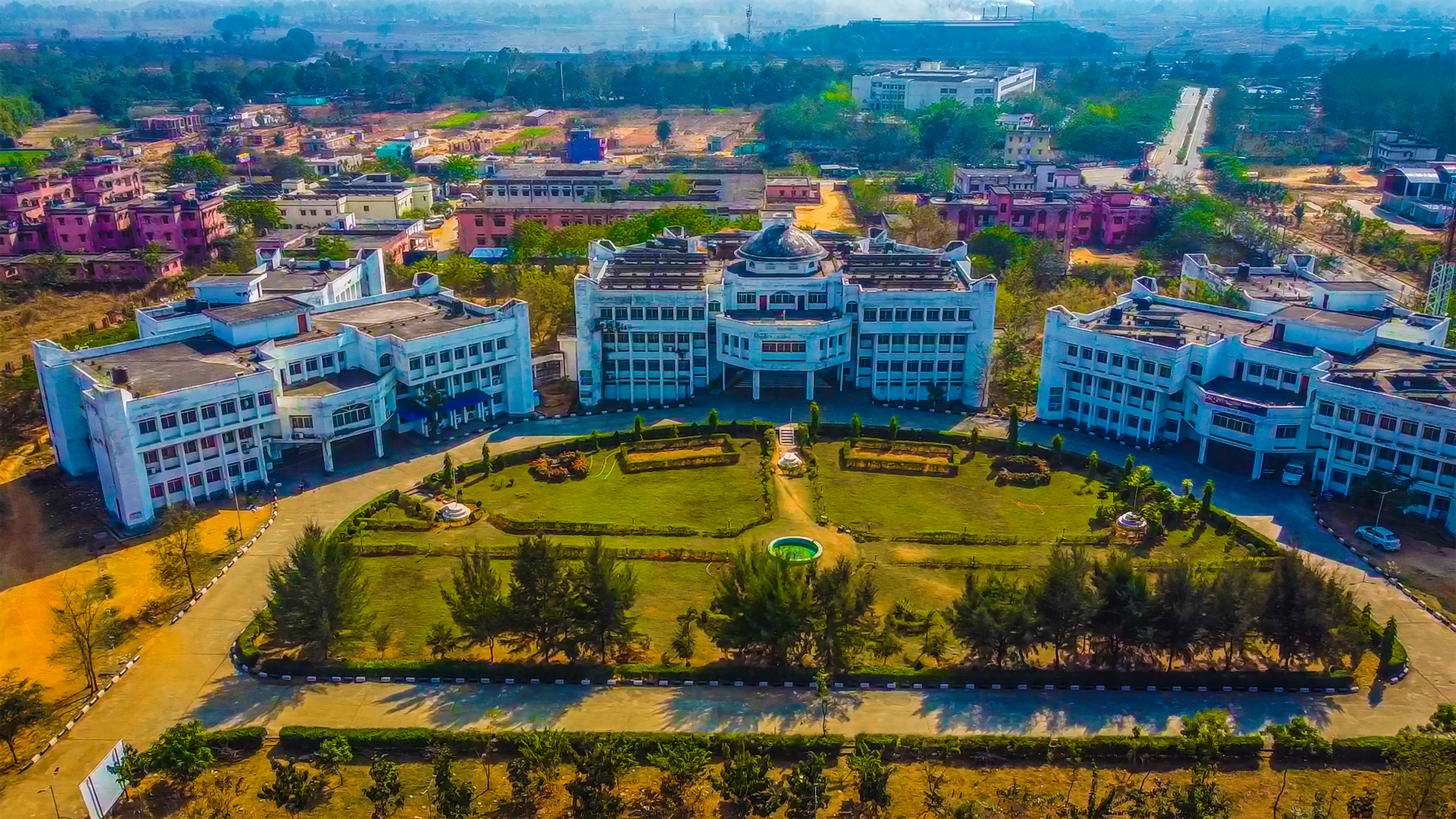
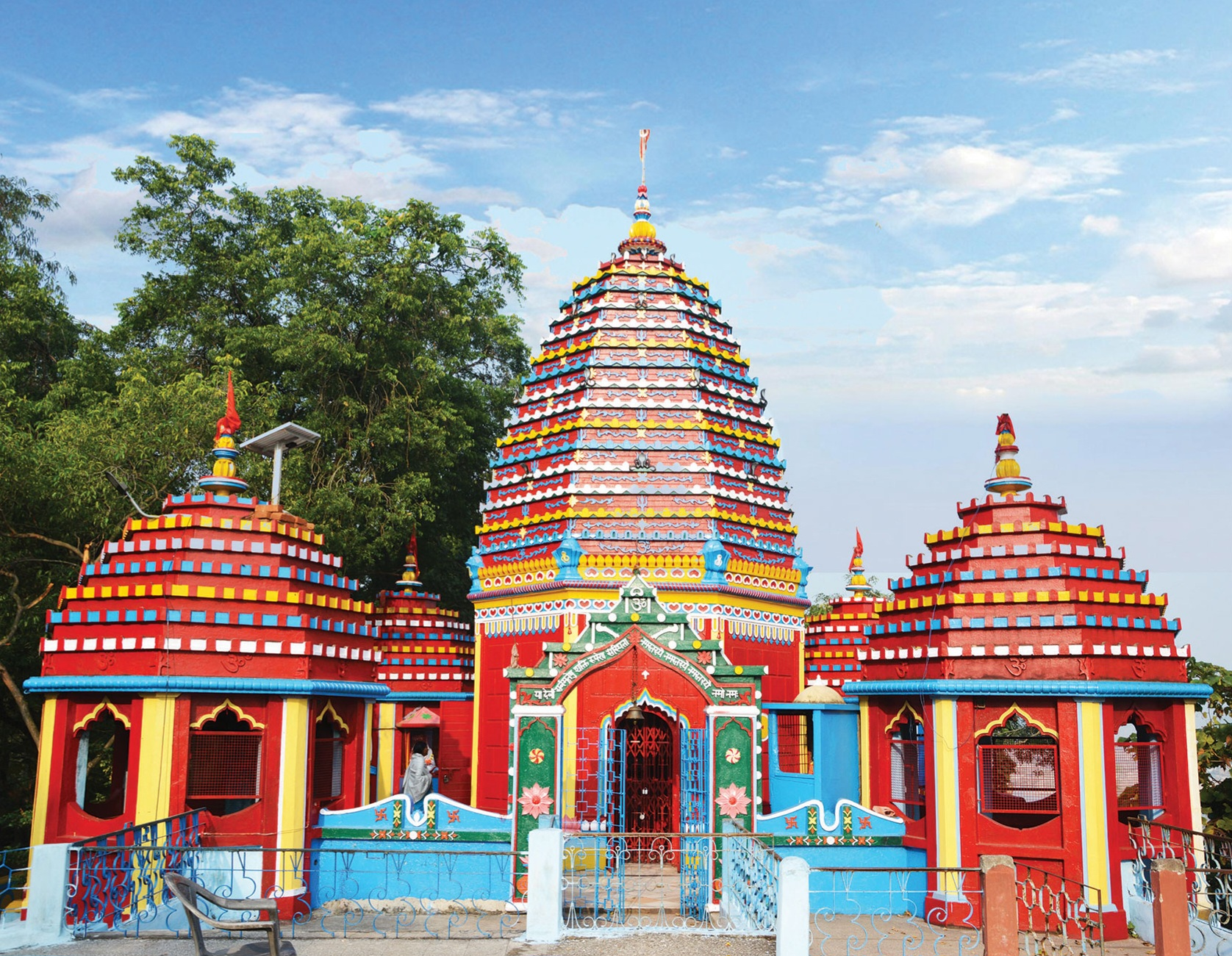
- Top to bottom: Patratu Valley at night, Patratu Dam, District Collectorate, Ramgarh, Chhinnamasta Temple
- Interactive map of Ramgarh district
- Country: India
- State: Jharkhand
- Division: North Chotanagpur
- Headquarters: Ramgarh Cantonment
- Tehsils: Ramgarh

Government
  - Deputy Commissioner: Shri Chandan Kumar (IAS)
  - Lok Sabha constituencies: Hazaribagh
  - Vidhan Sabha constituencies: Ramgarh,Barkagaon

Area
  - Total: 1,341 km^{2} (518 sq mi)
  - Rank: 23

Population (2011)
  - Total: 949,443
  - Rank: 24
  - Density: 708.0/km^{2} (1,834/sq mi)
  - Urban: 4,372

Demographics
  - Literacy: 73.17%
  - Sex ratio: 921
- Time zone: UTC+05:30 (IST)
- Vehicle registration: JH-24
- Major highways: NH 20 and NH 23
- Website: ramgarh.nic.in

Ramgarh district is one of the 24 districts in the Indian state of Jharkhand. It was also a military district during the British Regime, referred to then as Ramgarh district. It is the part of State Capital Region (SCR).

Ramgarh was made a district on 12 September 2007. It was carved out of erstwhile Hazaribagh District. Ramgarh lies at the heart of the Jharkhand state. It is a mining, industrial and cultural hub with the Maa Chhinnamasta Temple. In 1670s, the king Dalel Singh shifted the capital of Ramgarh Raj to Ramgarh and named it after his father Ram Singh. The district of Ramgarh has been named after the town Ramgarh, its present headquarters.

== Etymology ==
The word Ram is derived from Murram and Gadh is derived from Beluagadha. In Hazaribagh district, there is Sitagadha and Vishnugadha. Thus, the name Ramgarh must have been derived by using syllables of these places.

== History ==
=== Ancient history ===
Stone age: Along the river Damodar in Ramgarh, early Stone Age (Lower Paleolithic) tools were found.

Mahajanapadas: The gigantic king Jarasandh was very powerful. Chotanagpur was in his jurisdiction; probably the Chhotanagpur was under sub-ordination of Mahapadam of Magadh Nand Ugrasen of Nagwanshi's.

Maurya Empire: It is also said that entire Chhotanagpur was under sub-ordination of Ashoka the Great (c. 273 – c. 232 BC) so that in Buddha period.

Buddhism and Jainism: It is certified by the symbolic relics of Buddha period in the temple of Gola. Probably in the 8th century BC. (3) Jain Trithankar was constructed in Parasnath.

Gupta Empire: King Samudragupta (c. 385 – c. 380 AD) had invaded Eastern Deccan by passing through this area.

=== Medieval period ===
In Turk-Afghan period (1206-1526 AD.), Jharkhand the forest country was under subordination of ruler of that time. The Ramgarh Raj was established in 1368. The founder King of Ramgarh regime was King Bagdeo Singh. At that time the capital of Ramgarh was in Sira. The headquarters of the capital was moved to Urda, Badam, Ramgarh and Padma one by one. In 1670 the headquarters of Ramgarh regime was moved to Ramgarh. The Ramgarh Regime is also known as Padma Raja or Regime.

=== British regime ===
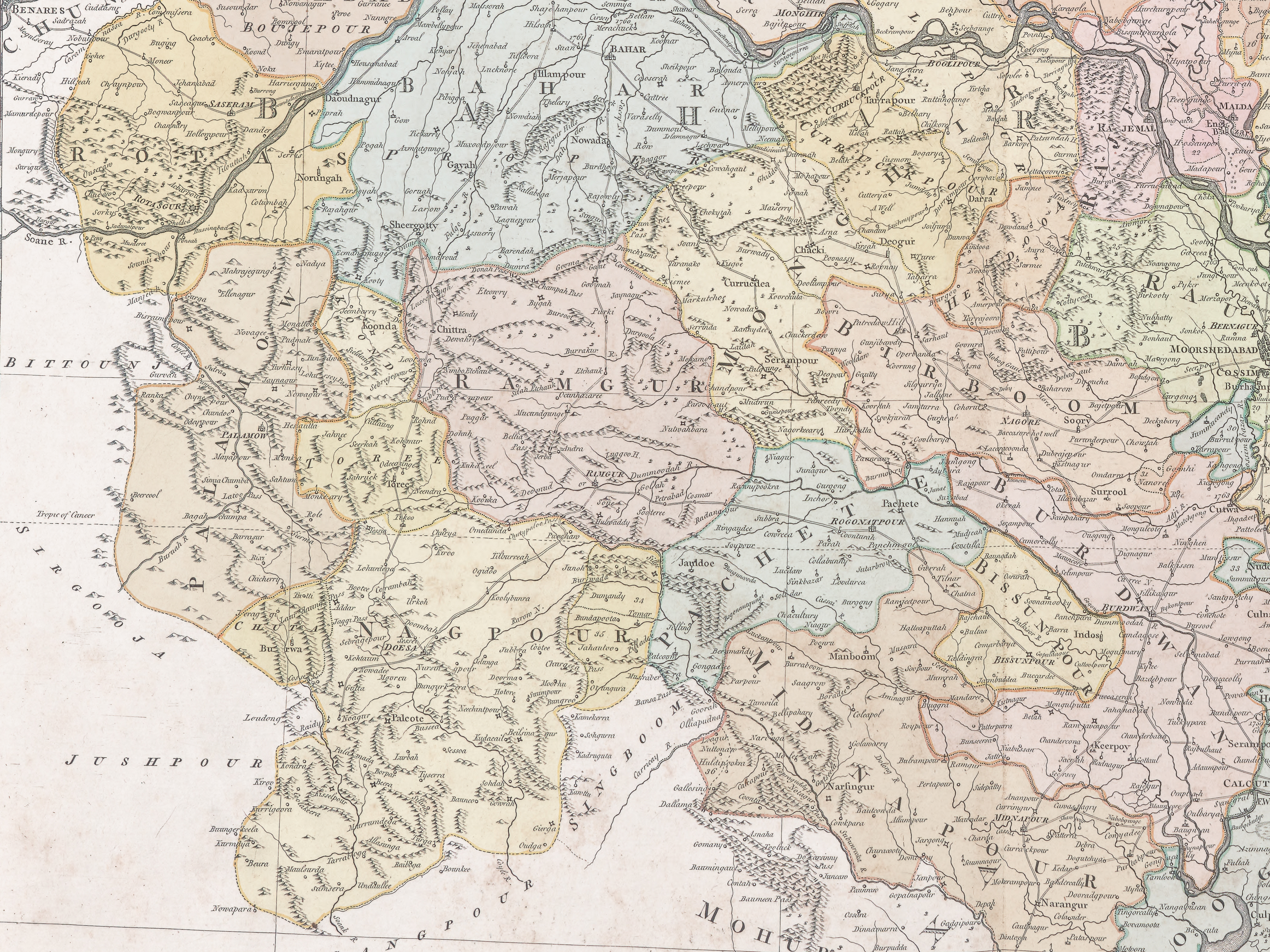
Greater Ramgarh in the 1770s, map by James Rennell.

The power of obtaining reference from Ramgarh regime was given to East India Company by King Shah Alam II.

In 1771, Captain Comac was made Military Collector of Ramgarh District, whose headquarters was in Chatra. The military district of Ramgarh contained Nagpur, Palamu, Hazaribagh, Chatra, Giridih and Kodarma. At that the headquarters of Ramgarh Battalion was Hazaribagh, whose commander was a European. The district name is often spelled "Ramghur" in English documents of the time.

In 1811, Ramgarh Battalion was used for suppressing the Munda, Uraon and Tamad Revolt and Kol revolt. In 1837, Ramgarh was a police station for the British government. In 1938, a new G.T. road was built and Banaras road was closed. In Sitagarh, coffee was grown. The name of Rupu Manjhi is famous in the first national revolt of 1857.

On 8 January 1856, Sheik Bhikari and Thakur Upraon Singh were hanged on a bunyan tree in Chhuttupalu valley. This valley is also known as lalki Ghaati and that bunyan tree is called Phansiyahi bore.

Ramgarh Cantonment council was structured in 1941. There are two Army training centers, Sikh Regimental Centre (SRC) and Punjab Regimental Centre (PRC).

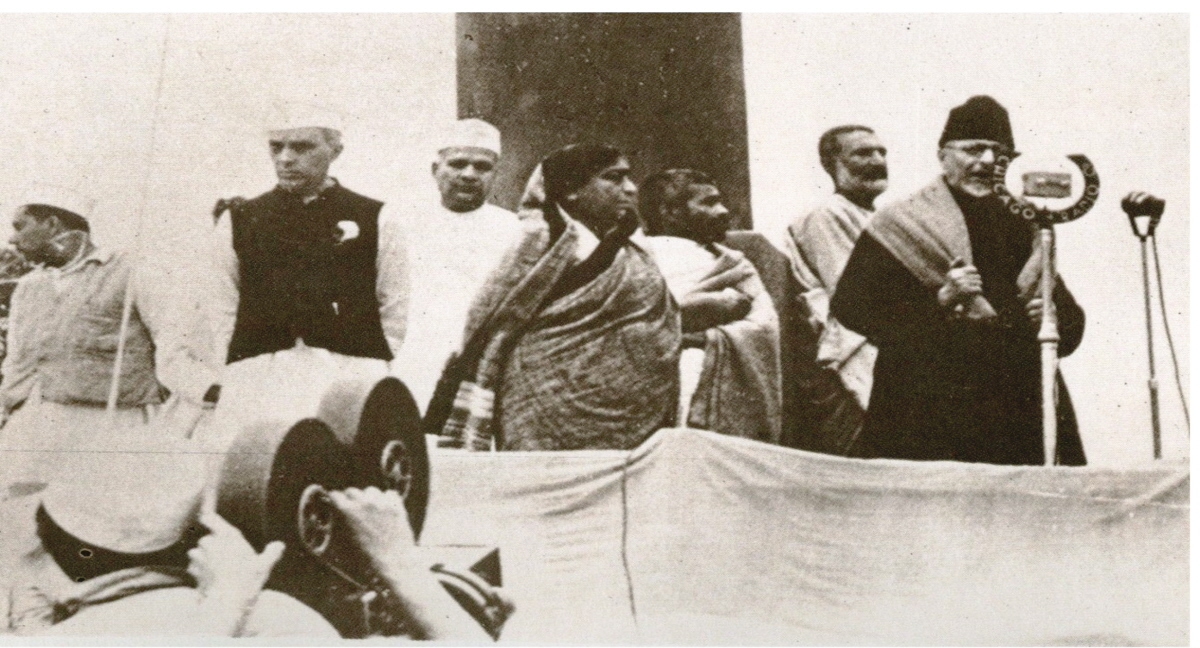
Jawaharlal Nehru, industrialist Jamnalal Bajaj, Sarojini Naidu, Khan Abdul Ghaffar Khan, andMaulana Azad at the 1940 Ramgarh Session of the Indian National Congress

In March 1940, INC 53rd Session was accomplished under the presidency of Maulana Abul Qalam Azad at Jhanda Chowk, Ramgarh now Ramgarh Cantonment Mahatma Gandhi, Jawaharlal Nehru, Sardar Patel, Dr. Rajendra Prasad, Sarojini Naidu, Khan Abdul Ghaffar Khan, Acharya J.B. Kripalani, Industrialist Jamnalal Bajaj and other leaders of the Indian freedom movement attended the Ramgarh Session. Mahatma Gandhi also opened khadi and village Industries Exhibition at Ramgarh.

At that time, under the leadership of Netajee Subhas Chandra Bose, a conference against Samjhauta was also completed. In Ramgarh, Subhsha Chandra Bose was seen as president of All India Forward Block and M.N. Roy was seen as leader of the radical democratic party.

=== Post-independence ===
After independence in 1947, the territory of the present-day Ramgarh district became a part of erstwhile Hazaribagh district. In 1952 Ramgarh Block was created and in 1991 Ramgarh Subdivision was formed. Sikh Regimental Centre was shifted from Merrut to Ramgarh Cantonment in 1976. On 12 September 2007, Ramgarh was made a district consisting of Ramgarh, Gola, Mandu and Patratu Block, taking the total count of districts in the state to 24.

On 13 September 2012, Ramgarh become the first district in the country where payment of government schemes like KCC and Indra Awash was done through UID or Aadhaar cards.

== Administration ==
Ramgarh district consists of six blocks (or 'mandals'). These include Ramgarh, Gola, Mandu, Patratu, Chitarpur, and Dulmi blocks.

=== Panchayats and Villages ===
See: List of villages in Ramgarh district

== Geography ==
=== Physiography ===
The district is a part of Chotanagpur plateau. Important physiographic regions of the district are Damodar Trough or Upper Damodar basin or Damodar Valley. The majority of the district falls in the Damodar Valley. Damodar Valley is bounded by Hazaribag Plateau in north and Ranchi Plateau in south. Ranchi and Hazaribag plateau is separated by east–west running Damodar Valley.

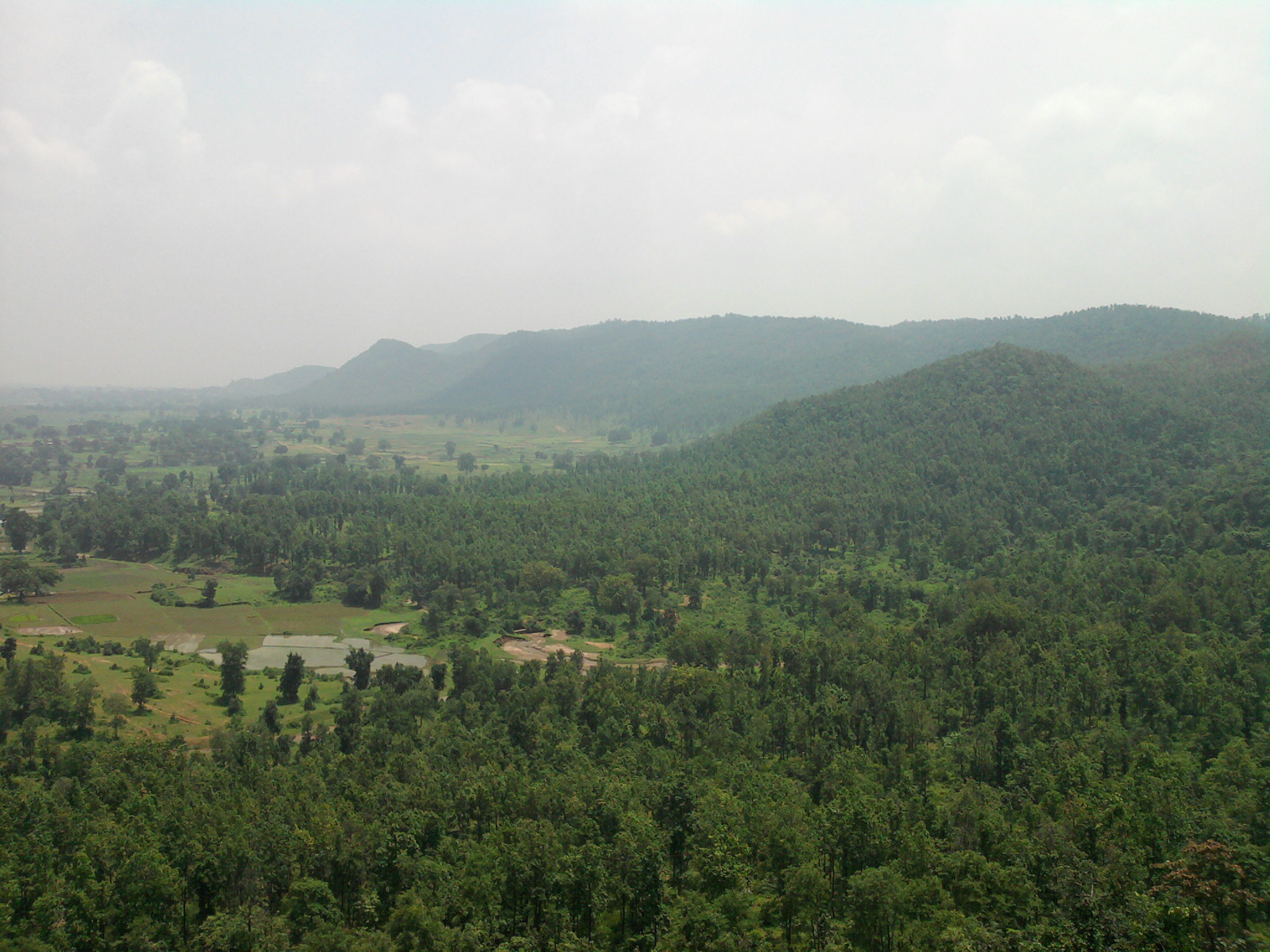
A View of Ranchi Plateau and Damodar Valley, between Ramgarh and Chutupallu

Barka Pahar (Marang Buru) 1,049 m (3,442 ft) high above sea level located along the Ramgarh-Ranchi border is probably the highest peak, and it also separates the districts.

=== Soils and climate ===
There are mainly two types of soil, red soil and sand loam.

In terms of climate, the area lies in the sub-humid region of Chotanagpur Plateau and has a semi-extreme type of climate. The day temperature rises to around 40 °C (104 °F) during the summers and drops to around 10 °C (50 °F) during the winter.

The winter season broadly runs from November to February, the hot season from March to May, and the rainy season from June to October.

=== Forests and wildlife ===
The forest area of the district is 487.93 km^{2} (188.39 sq mi). The district is rich in flora and fauna. The government has planned a deer park in the district. The park will come up on 25 acres (10 ha) on Gola-Muri Road in Gola block. 30 villages in the district are affected by elephants.

=== Rivers and river basins ===
Damodar is the main river of the district and it also forms a major river basin, comprising a number of tributaries. Important amongst them are: Naikari, Bhervi or Bhera and Bokaro river.

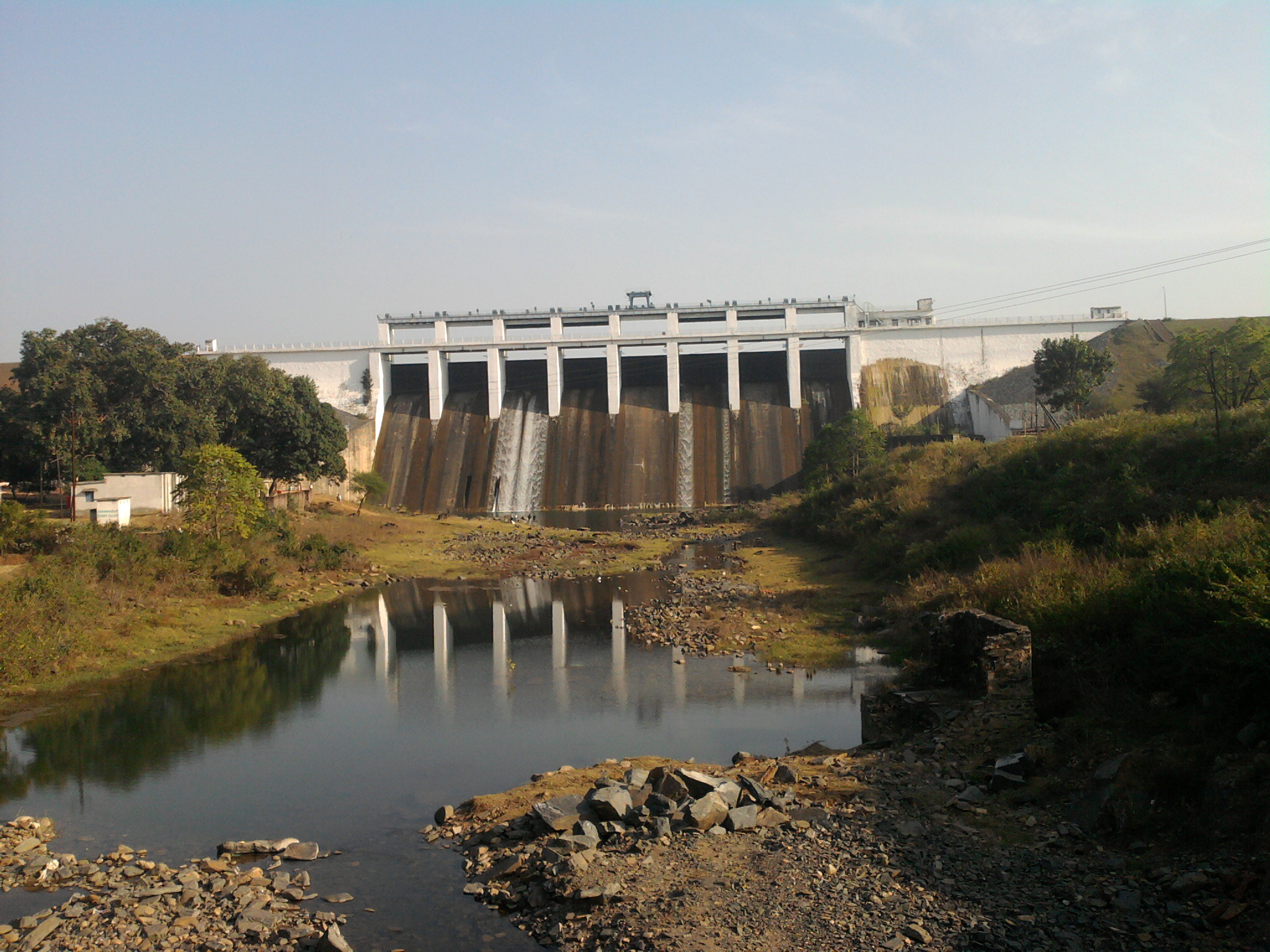
Naikari Dam, Patratu

In Hindu mythology and folklore Damodar is a Nad means Male River.

Small rivers include the Hurhuri, Gomti, Barki, Kurum, Kochi, Sherbhuki, and Dhobdhab rivers.

Suwarn Rekha River flow south eastern part of district. Tributaries of Suwarn Rekha River include Kadamgara and Khatgara.

== Demographics ==
Historical population
Year	Pop.	±%
1901	123,154	—
1911	134,733	+9.4%
1921	133,503	−0.9%
1931	158,638	+18.8%
1941	183,100	+15.4%
1951	202,533	+10.6%
1961	265,261	+31.0%
1971	362,188	+36.5%
1981	544,330	+50.3%
1991	698,081	+28.2%
2001	839,482	+20.3%
2011	949,443	+13.1%
Source: Census of India

Religion in Ramgarh district (2011)
Religion	Percent
Hinduism	81.55%
Islam	13.59%
Sarna	3.41%
Christianity	0.76%
Other or not stated	0.27%

According to the 2011 census, Ramgarh district has a population of 949,443, roughly equal to the nation of Fiji or the US state of Delaware. This gives it a ranking of 459th in India (out of a total of 640). The district has a population density of 708 inhabitants per square kilometre (1,830/sq mi). Its population growth rate over the decade 2001-2011 was 13.06%. Ramgarh has a sex ratio of 921 females for every 1000 males, and a literacy rate of 73.17%. 44.13% of the population lives in urban areas. Scheduled Castes and Scheduled Tribes make up 11.20% and 21.19% of the population respectively.

Languages of Ramgarh district (2011)
1. Khortha (56.6%)
2. Hindi (18.2%)
3. Urdu (8.17%)
4. Santali (3.72%)
5. Bhojpuri (2.91%)
6. Magahi (2.78%)
7. Sadri (1.89%)
8. Bengali (1.59%)
9. Others (4.11%)

At the time of the 2011 Census of India, 56.63% of the population in the district spoke Khortha, 18.2% Hindi, 8.17% Urdu, 3.72% Santali, 2.91% Bhojpuri, 2.78% Magahi and 1.59% Bengali as their first language.

== Transport ==
=== Rail ===
In 1927, Bengal Nagpur Railway (BNR) opened the 72-mile (116 km) Chandil-Barkakana section to traffic. The same year, the Central India Coalfields (CIC) Railway opened the Gomoh-Barkakana line. It was extended to Daltonganj in 1929. Later it was extended to Sonnagar on Howrah-Delhi Grand Chord line and one more branch was extended to Singrauli from Garwa Road.

At present the district railway network is divided between two zone East Central Railways and South Eastern Railway.

Ramgarh Cantonment, Mael, Barkipona, Gola Road, Harubera, Sondimra and Barlanga Station come under Ranchi Division of SER.

Ranchi Road, Chainpur, Argada, Barkakana Junction, Bhurkunda, Patratu and Tokisud station come Under Dhanbad Division of ECR.

Barkakana is a railway sub-division under Dhanbad division of East Central Railway zone. Doubling of Danea-Ranchi Road line has announced in the Railway Budget 2013–14.

==== New rail line project ====
Ranchi-Koderma-Tilaiya Junction railway station (Bihar) new rail line project of the state passes through the district. The district portion between Sidhwar-Barkakana-Kuju and Mandu is already completed. The distance between Ranchi and Barkakana by train will be reduced by half with the new rail line. Completion of this project will also shorten the distance between Barkakana, Patna and Delhi. The Bakhtiyarpur–Rajgir line was extended to Tilaiya in 2010. After completion of the line, Barkakana will be connected to Bakhtiyarpur. Rajgir, Biharsharif, etc. Tilaiya Junction railway station is situated near Rajoli of Nawada district of Bihar, not to be confused with Tilaiya, Tilaiya Dam, or Jhumri Tilaiya of Jharkhand.

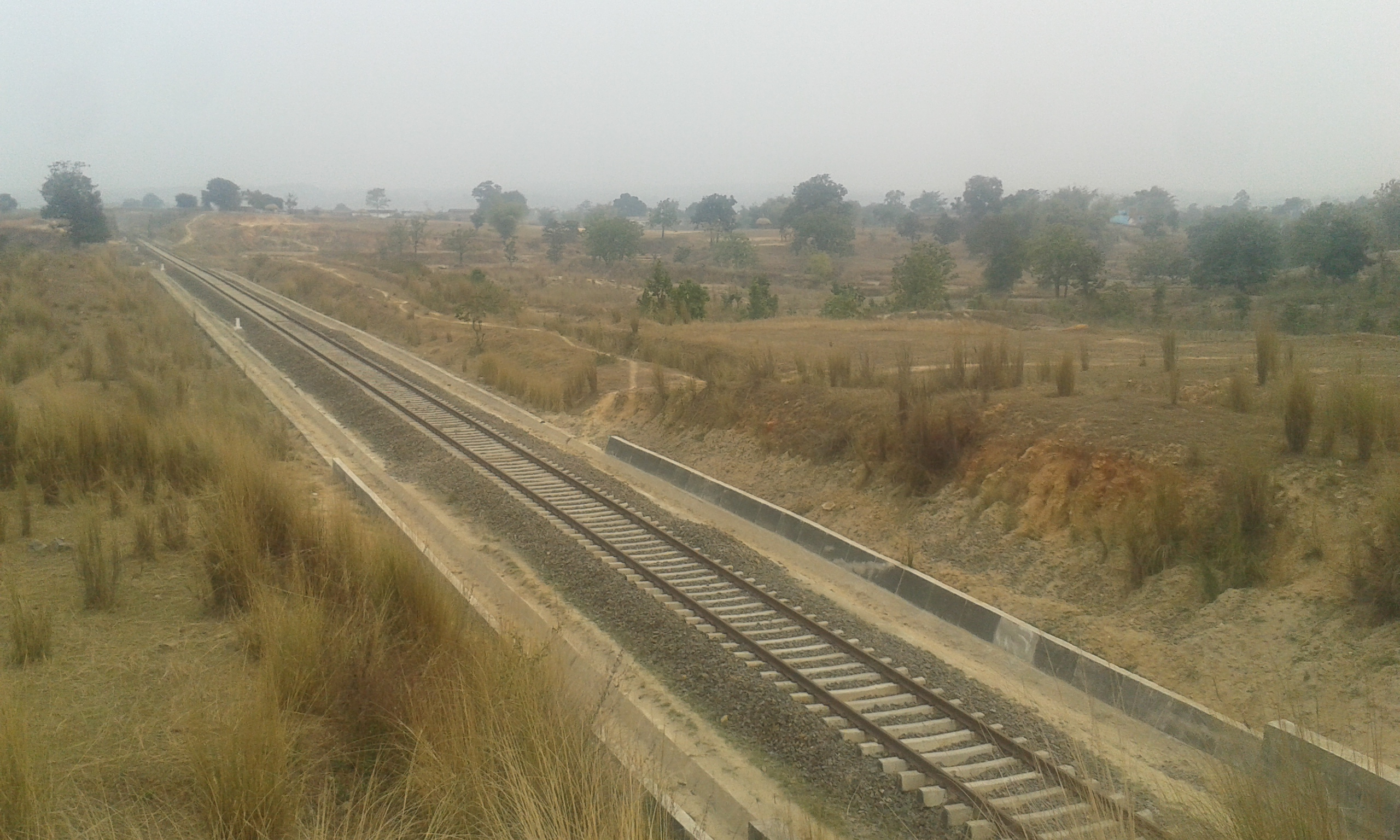
A view of the new rail line between Kuju and Mandu

The 57 km (35 mi)-long Barkakana-Hazaribagh section of the new Koderma-Ranchi line project was inaugurated on 7 December 2016 by Railway Minister Suresh Prabhu in the presence of Chief Minister Raghubar Das.

Special passenger train service started on 31 March 2017 from Barkakana Junction to Sidhwar station of Barkakana–Ranchi new line section.

A trial run of the passenger train between Tatisilwai and Sanki railway stations (31.4 km) on Ranchi Barkakana's new rail line was conducted on 17 January 2018.

The new railway line between Tatisilwai and Sanki was inaugurated by CM Ragubar Das on 29 August 2019. Two new pairs of passenger trains between Hatia and Sanki stations were implemented on 29 August 2019.

=== Roads ===
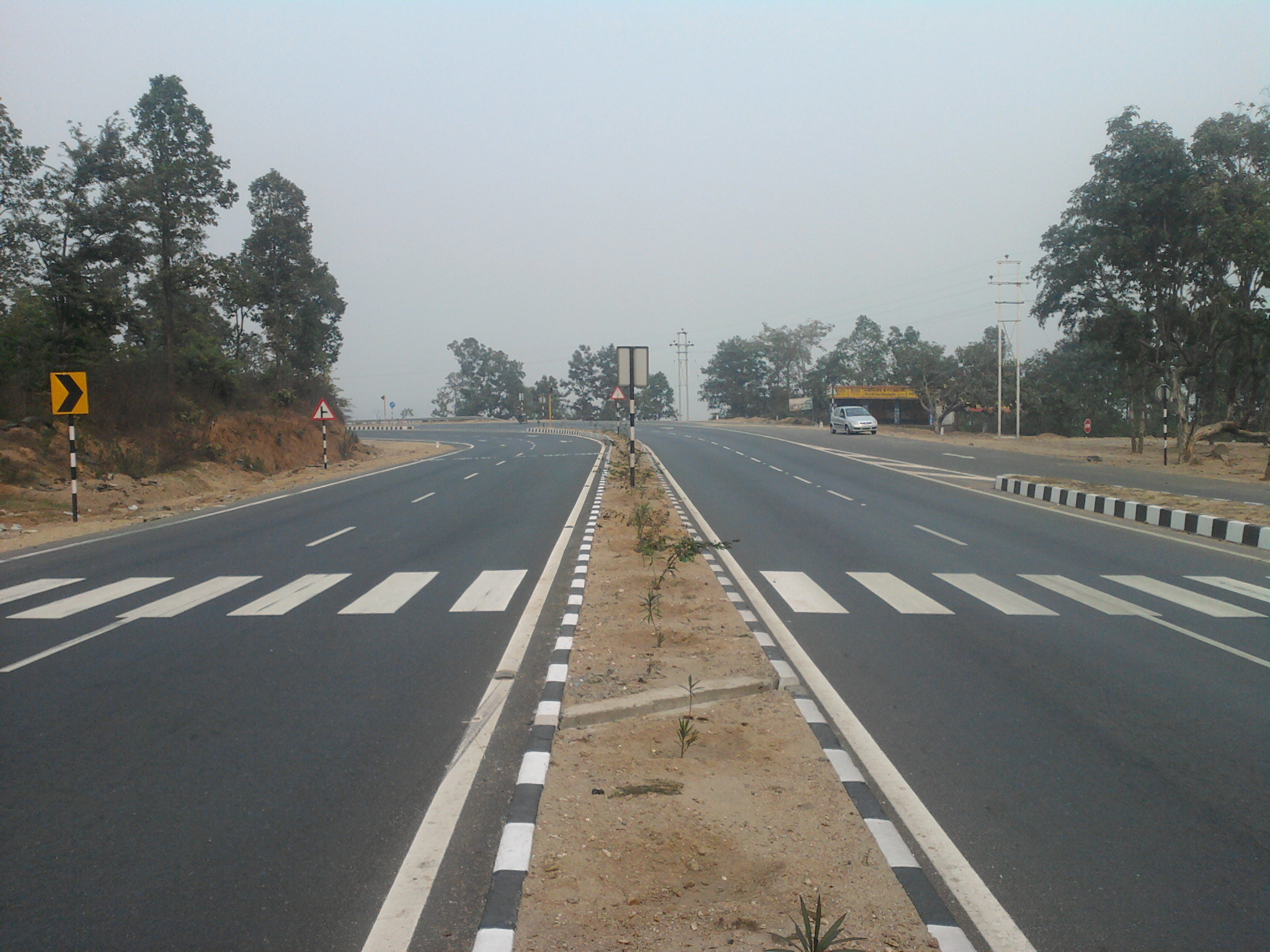
NH 20 Between Ramgarh and Chutupallu

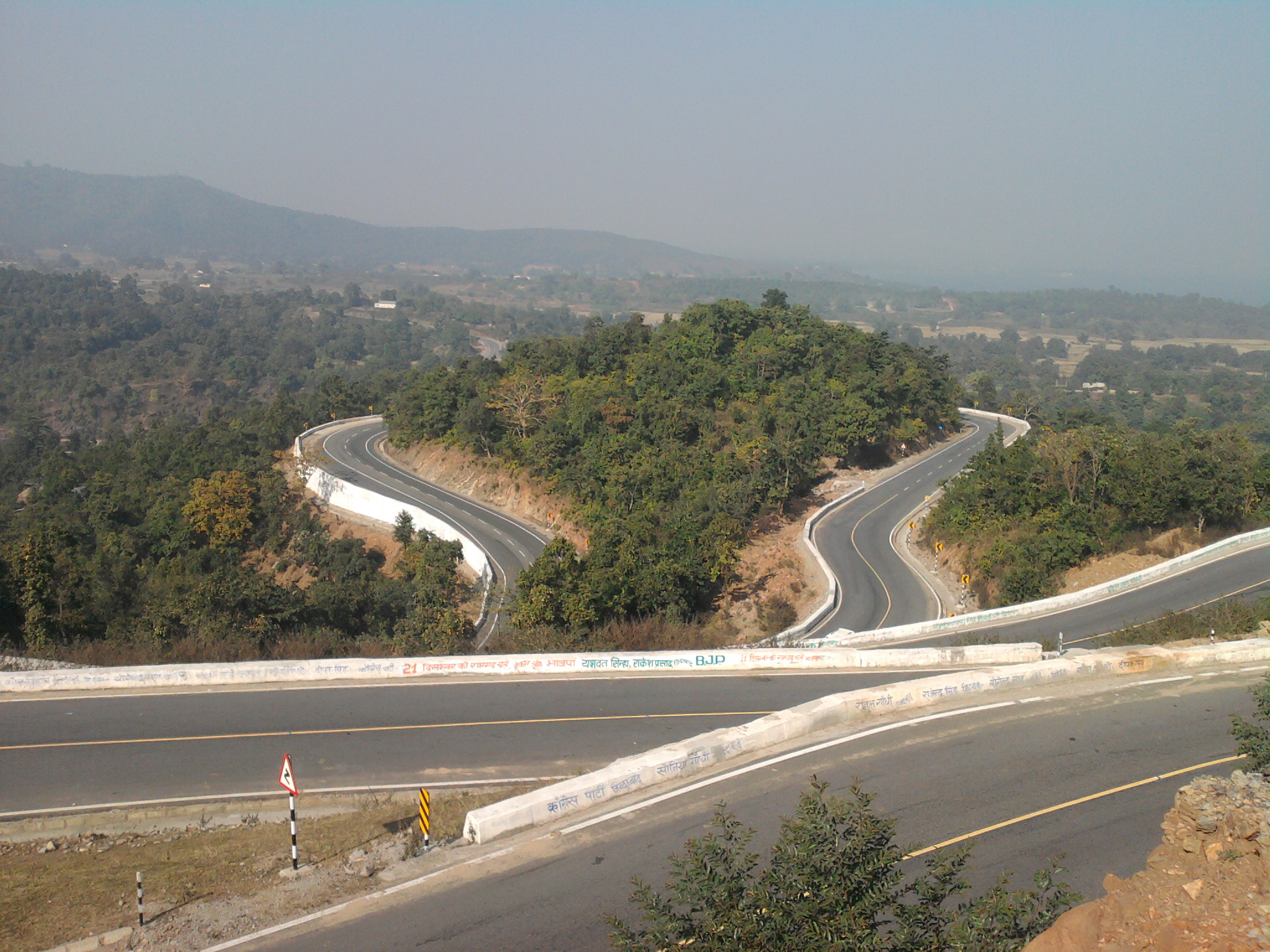
State Highway No.2 between Patratu and Ranchi

Road are the major means of transportation in the district. Three major expressways (NH-20, NH-23 and SH-2) pass through the district. The State Highways Authority of Jharkhand (SHAJ) is planning to construct a four-lane road between Patratu and Dhanbad via Sayal, Naya Mor, Chas Mor and Raj Ganj.

National highway

The main national highways crossing the district are NH-20 and NH-23.

National Highway 23 connects to NH-20 at Mahatma Gandhi Chowk, Ramgarh Cantonment.

State highways serving the area include State Highway No.2.

=== Airport ===
Birsa Munda Airport (45 km (28 mi)) at Ranchi is the nearest airport. Direct links are available to prominent cities such as Delhi, Patna, Mumbai and Kolkata.

== Economy ==
The district holds a strong position on the mineral map of the country. The district is endowed with a large and rich deposit of coal and coalbed methane (CBM) and also possesses various other minerals like limestone as well as fire clay.

The coalfields of the Ramgarh district lie in the Damodar Valley. The important geological formation of the district is the Gondwana System and the rocks of the Damuda Group of Lower Gondwana age comprises the most important coal seams. The district's coal deposits are mainly found in South Karanpura, West Bokaro and Ramgarh coalfields.

=== Industries ===
Ramgarh is an important industrial district of East India. Several mineral-based industries like steel, sponge iron, cement, refractory and thermal power plants are established due to the availability of coal and other minerals.

=== Agriculture ===
The main occupation of the people of Ramgarh is farming. There are three main agricultural seasons in the district: kharif, rabi, and zaid. Rice, maize, ragi, fruits and vegetables are the main crops of the district.

== Education ==
=== Schools ===
- Kendriya Vidyalaya :
- D A V Public School:
- Agrasen D. A. V. Public School, Bharech Nagar, Ramgarh.
- Army Public School, Ramgarh Cantonment. (Army Welfare Education Society)

=== Colleges ===
- Ramgarh College, Ramgarh

Engineering colleges

Ramgarh Engineering College opened in 2013. The government is also planning to open Jharkhand state's first women's engineering college in Ramgarh.

Medical colleges

The government is planning to open a new ESI Medical College in the district.

Management College

Birsa Institute of Technical Education (B.I.T.E. Ramgarh) opened in 2012 in Ramgarh.

== Culture and heritage ==
=== Fairs and festivals ===
The major and most celebrated fairs and festivals include Diwali, Holi, Durga Puja or Navaratri, Dussehra, Ramanavami, Karam or Karma, Sarhul, Tusu, Eid, Sarsawati puja, Chhath, Makar Sankranti, and Jivitputrika or Jitiya (Hindi: जिउतिया). Due to the presence of industry and mining activities, Vishwakarma Puja is also an important festival. Makar Sankranti fair at Rajrappa Mandir also attracts many people. Fairs are also organized during Jitiya, Karma and other festivals.

=== Cuisine ===
Ramgarh has a variety of foods and cuisines. The most well-known and common cuisine in Ramgarh includes roti (chapati) or phulka, rice or bhat, dal, sabzi or tarkari and achar (South Asian pickles). Dhuska and barra are popular local fast foods. Dhuska is made from rice and urad dal. Barra is also prepared using urad dal. Different types of flowers and leaves are used including bamboo shoots (karil), fried pumpkin flower pakora, khukri and mushroom tarkari. Khoya pedas of Rajrappa mandir is also a famous dry sweet.

=== Places of interest ===
==== Pilgrimage sites ====
- Tooti Jharna Temple: Situated about 7 km (4.3 mi) from Ramgarh Cantonment on NH-33 Ranchi-Patna highway, is a temple devoted to Lord Shiva where water from the river falls through a canal on Shivalinga. The Raghu baba of this temple is from the nearby village Digwar and hence most of the Digwar villagers are connected to this temple. It is very near Ranchi road, just 2–3 km (1.2–1.9 mi) ahead towards the way of Village Digwar.
- Mayatungri Temple: It is also known as Daughter of the Hills and is 5 km (3.1 mi) South of Ramgarh in the Chutupalu Valley. Although it is located on a height of 300 ft (91 m), it takes only 15 minutes to march to its peak. Every year the local festival of karma is celebrated here with gaiety and fanfare by the people of the surrounding villages. It is popularly believed that worshipping on the hill brings rain to this area. Nowadays on the occasion of Durgapuja, Nawratra is performed twice a year on this hill.
- Kaitha Shiv Mandir: This ancient temple of Shiva is located on NH-23 and is 3 km (1.9 mi) away from Ramgarh Cantonment. It has been declared a national monument. The temple was built in 1670. The Shivalinga in the temple is located at a height which is accessible by means of two stairs. At present this temple is in a dilapidated condition.
- Khere Math: Khere Math temple of Gautama Buddha is situated at Matwa-tand village near NH-23 of Gola Block.
- Gurudawara Singh Sabha: This Gurudwara was established and inaugurated by the Sikh community of Ramgarh around 1940 in a small room situated on Shivajee road in Ramgarh. Today a grand structure has taken the form of Gurudwara Sri Guru Singh Sabha in place of that small room. It is the centre of attraction for its great tomb and minarets. The interior decoration of the Darbar hall of Gurudwara Sahib is picture squire.

==== Rajrappa Mandir ====
The Maa Chhinmastika temple (मां छिन्नमस्तिका मंदिर) is situated at Rajrappa (रजरप्पा), 28 km (17 mi) away from Ramgarh Cantonment on the confluence of rivers Damodar and Bhairavi (भैरवी) or Bhera (भेड़ा). This temple is noted in the Vedas and Puranas and it has been recognized as an ancient and strong source of Shakti, or divine energy. The Chhinamastika Temple is a place of Hindu pilgrimage. Devotees from all parts of the country visit this holy place throughout the year. The temple is very old and its architectural design is the same as that of other temples of tantrik importance, though its antiquity is yet to be dated. Marriages are also solemnized here on a large scale. The headless statue of the goddess Chhinamastika (छिन्नमस्तिका) stands upon the bodies of Kamdeo and Rati in a lotus bed. A number of other temples have come up around the original temple, particularly, the temples of Mahavidyas (Tara, Shodashi, Bhubneswari, Bhairavi, Bagla, Kamla, Matangi, and Dhumavati) built in a series as well as other temples. These include the Sun God temple, Lord Shiva temple, Hanuman temple, and Ma Kali temple. In Hindu mythology, Damodar is considered an incarnation of the god Shiva and while Bharvi is the goddess Shakti. The confluence of both rivers in Rajrappa is considered a scared union of Damoder (Shiva) and Bharvai (Shakti). The water of the river Bharvi flows down from the top to the river Damoder which flows below, which also shows goddess or devi power. Many take a dip in the river before offering puja. According to the chapter "Ramgarh" from the book East India Gazetteer by Walter Hamilton, published in 1828, as well as Comprehensive History of Bihar by Dr. Bindeshwari Prasad Sinha published in 1974, there is no evidence of pilgrimage places like Rajrappa or existence of the Chhinamastika Temple at Rajrappa in the Ramgarh area of undivided Bihar.

A hundred years ago, the Damodar river was known as Damuda; damu means 'sacred' and da means 'water' in the Mundari language. Rajrappa means 'the burning place of kings' in Mundari; rappa means 'burn'. According to historian G. S. Sardesai, Rajputs from West India came to Bengal in Peshwa Nana Saheb's train. There was a last clash between Peshwa and Raghuji Bhonshle between present-day Gola and the Chitrapur mountain pass of Ramgarh in 1743. Peshwa's advance troops missed their passage to Ramgarh and turned towards the jungle, reaching an area near the confluence of the Bera river near Damuda. The missing unfortunate general was likely the Prince of Jawa (Mewar) Karam Singh with his troops, and they never joined Peshwa due to the dense forest and unknown mountain pass. Some Rajpoots passed away and were burnt there; later, this wild place was recognised as Rajrappa by Mundari-speaking people. After some years the area became prominent due to the daughter of Karam Raja Tusu. She became a sati by sacrificing her life in the Rajrappa waterfall after one day of Makar to get rid of Mirza Ramjani, brother of the deceased Mogul Nawab Siraj. After that, there was a tradition of immersing Tusu's idol at Rajrappa on the anniversary of her death. Later on, her soul was worshiped by her men and local people at Rajrappa in a small mandir by Sabar priest. Still now the Makar mela (fair) is very famous among the local people, but several years ago Tusu's immersion was declined for many reasons described by the natives. Some Bramhin priests from Medinpur settled near Rajrappa due to the gathering of people and the popularity of the small mandir. Tusu's name was later forgotten and her small mandir was shifted some feet above near the waterfall and converted to Chhinamastika Temple recently.

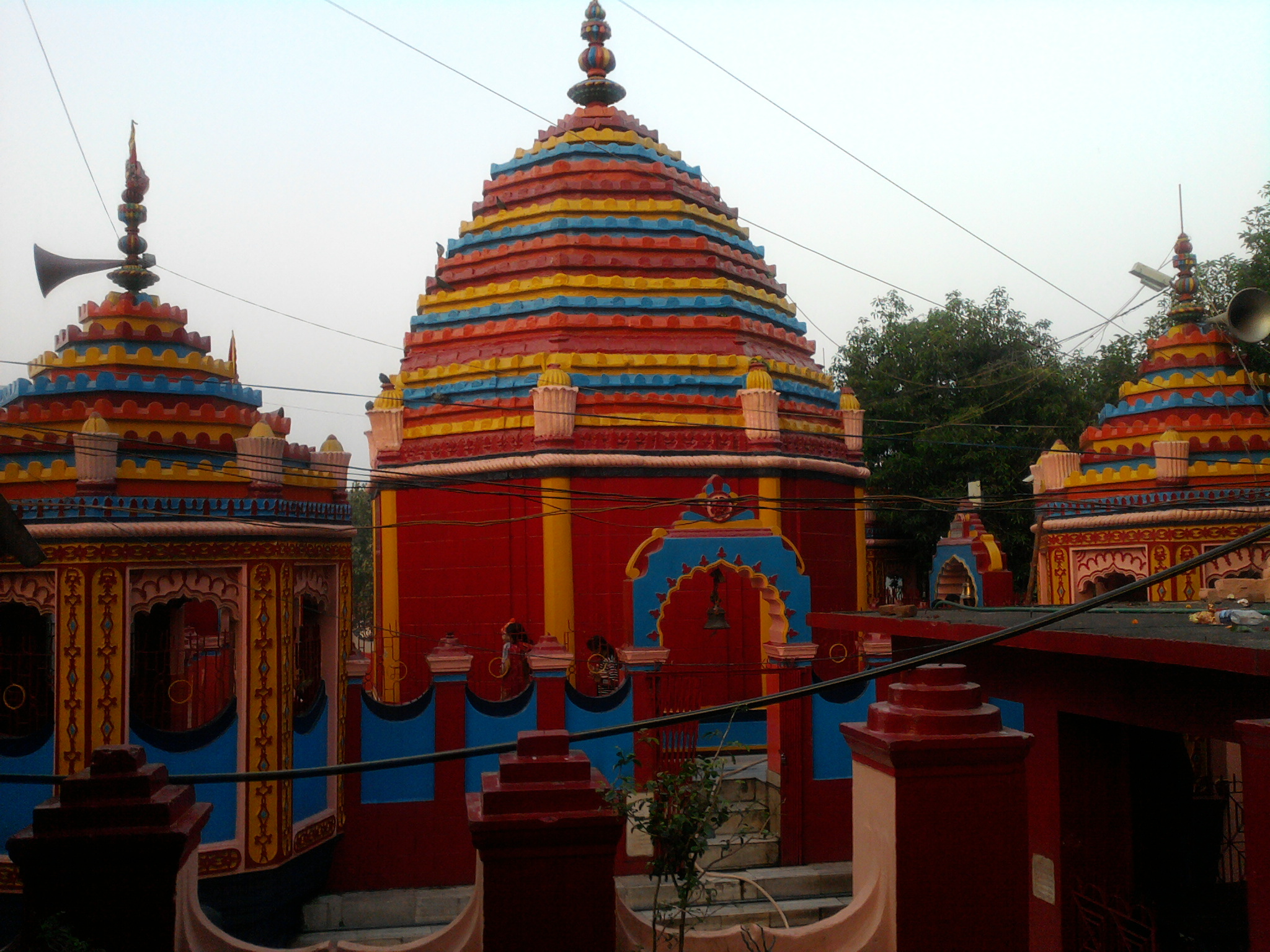
Maa Chhinnamasta Temple

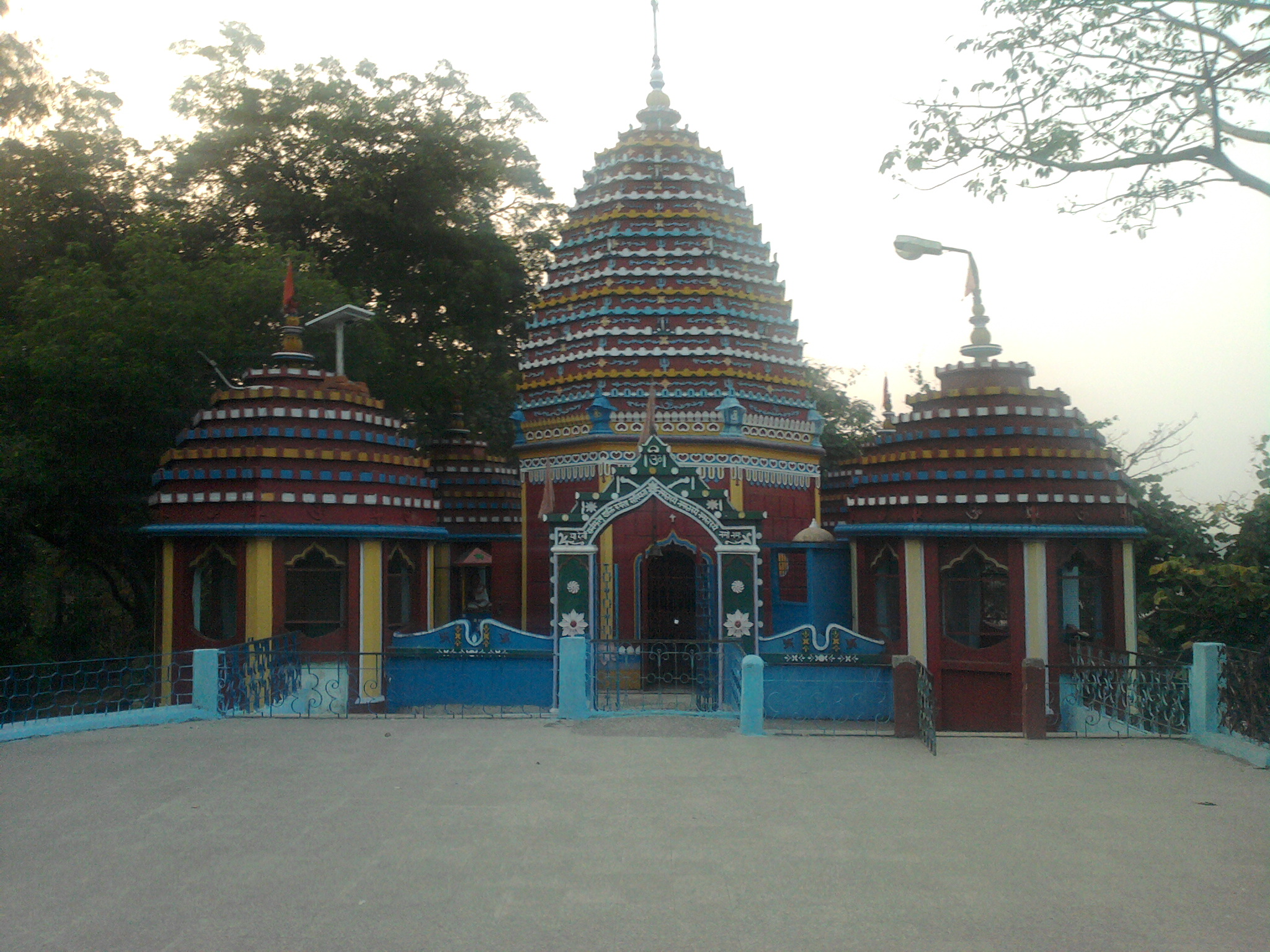
Dakshina Kali temple

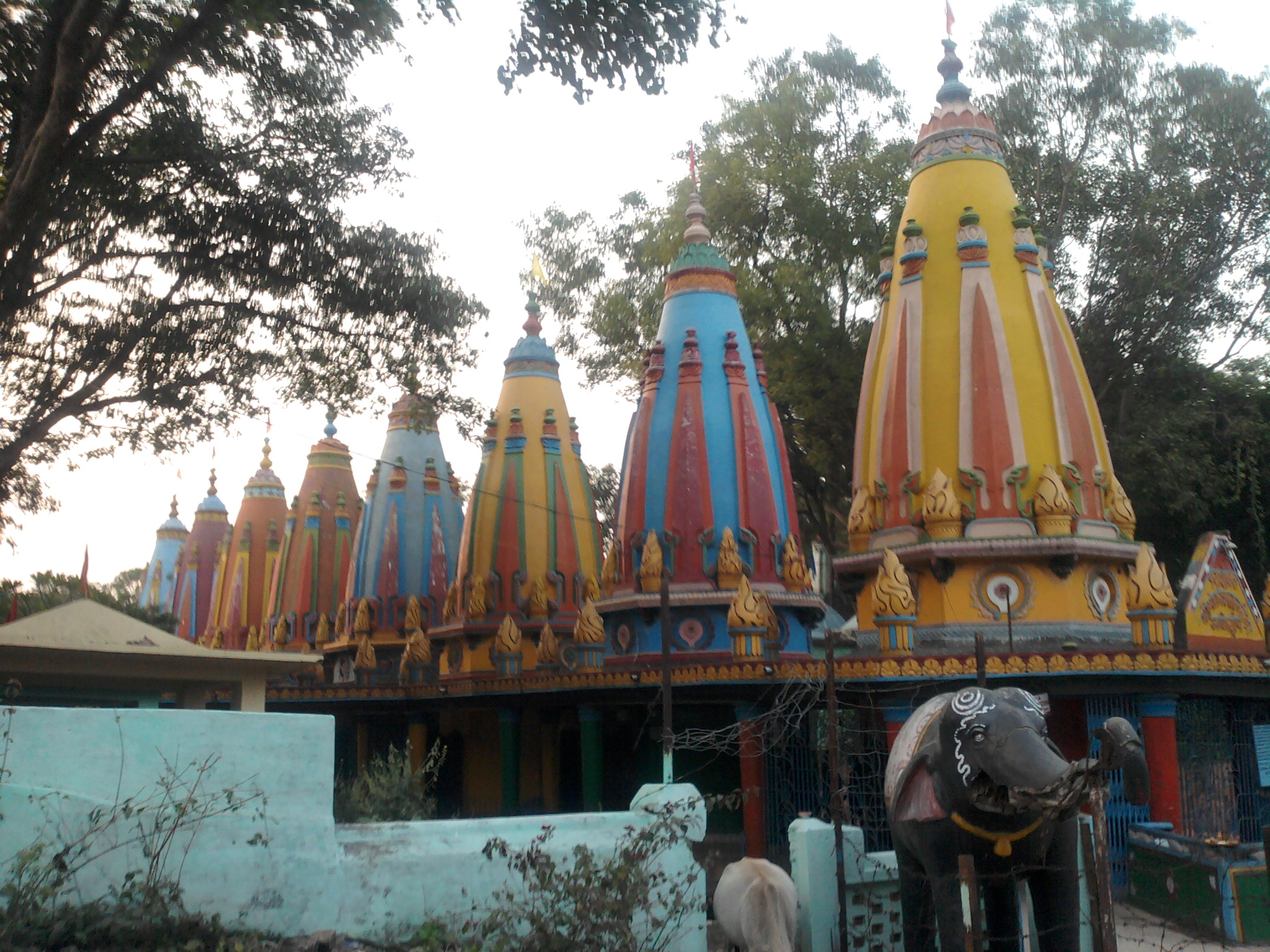
Temples of Mahavidyas built in a series

Rajrappa is not only famous for Shakta pitha (शाफ्त पीठ, shrines) but is also a picnic spot. Food, cooking materials, groceries, milk, fruits and fresh vegetables are also available in the market. One portion of the sand beach by the river Bharvi is prepared for picnics by madir samiti with the help of a caretaker or agent. They will provide space with Chatai, table, etc. after paying a nominal charge. During the rainy season the paid sand beach is submerged with water.

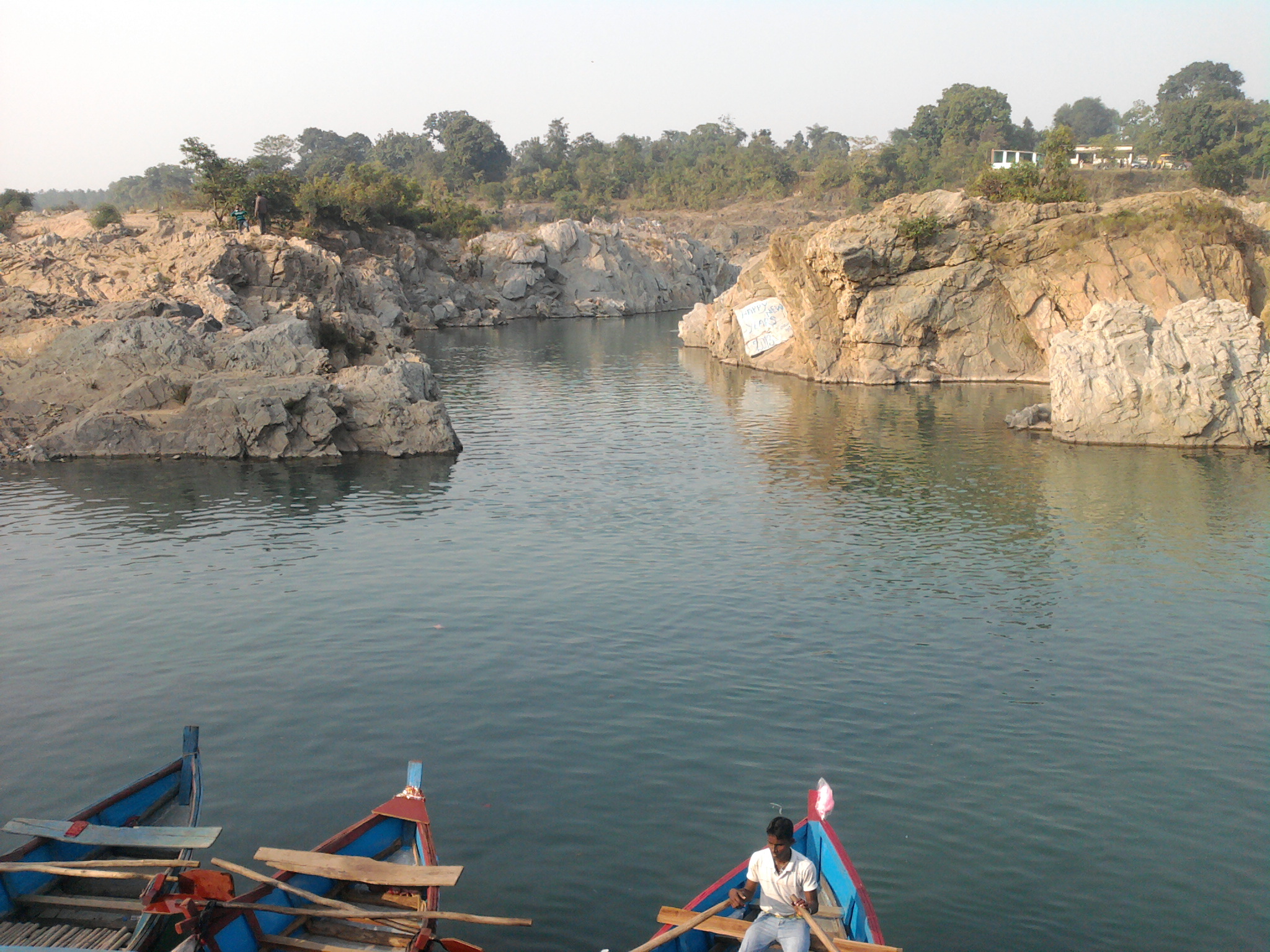
Damodar River (western side) Rajrappa Mandir

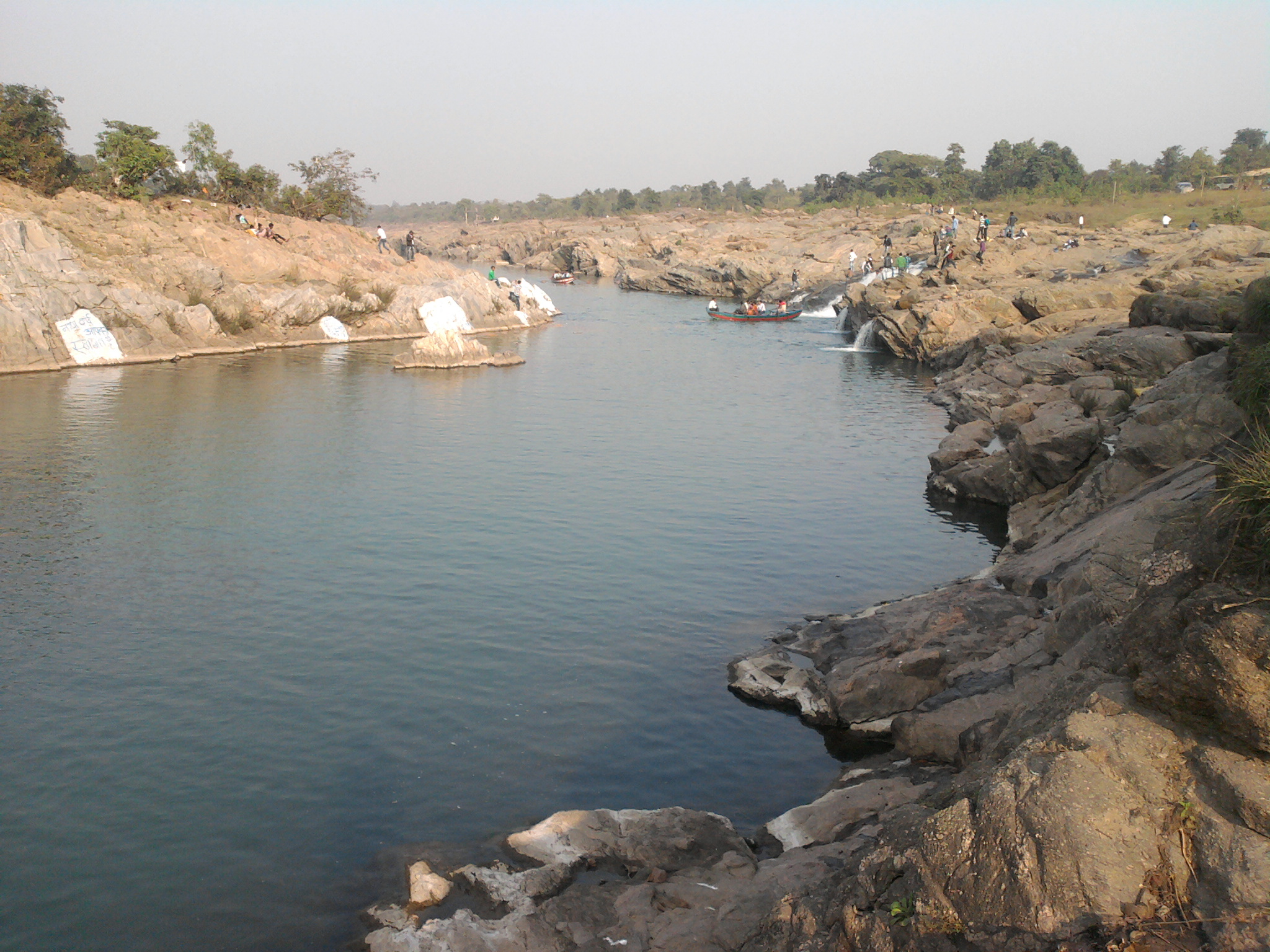
Damodar River (eastern side) Rajrappa Mandir

Event

Rajrappa Mohatsav:

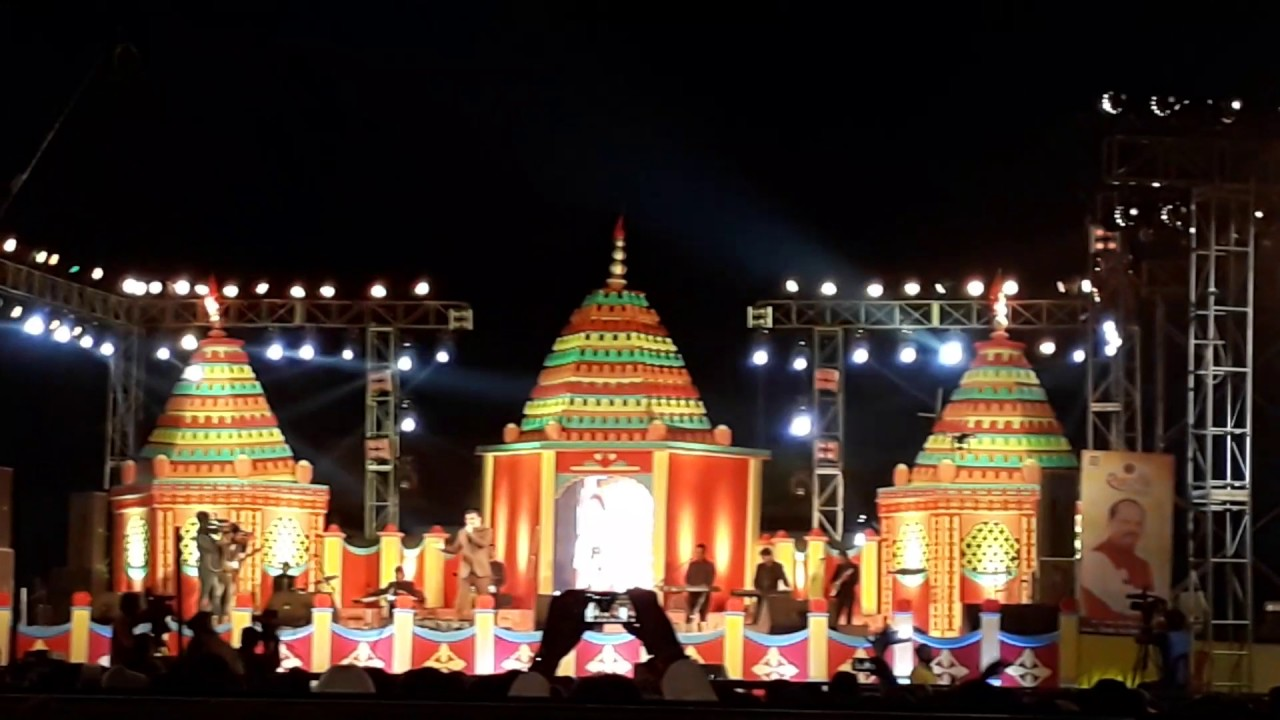
Stage of Rajrappa Mohatsav

The two-day grand Rajrappa Mahatsav is a tourism event organized for the promotion of the historic Rajrappa Temple of Jharkhand. With the joint efforts of Ramgarh District Administration, Central Coalfields Limited (CCL) authorities, CSR of corporate houses and Chinamastika Temple Administration, it was marked as a huge success on the first attempt. Many renowned artists including Abhijit Bhatacharya, Pooja Gaitonde, Chetan Joshi, Padamshree Mukund Nayak, Megha Dalton, and Bharat Sharma performed during the Mohatsav. The event was held for the first time on 25 and 26 February 2017.

=== Historic monuments ===
Mahatama Gandhi Samadhi Sathal:

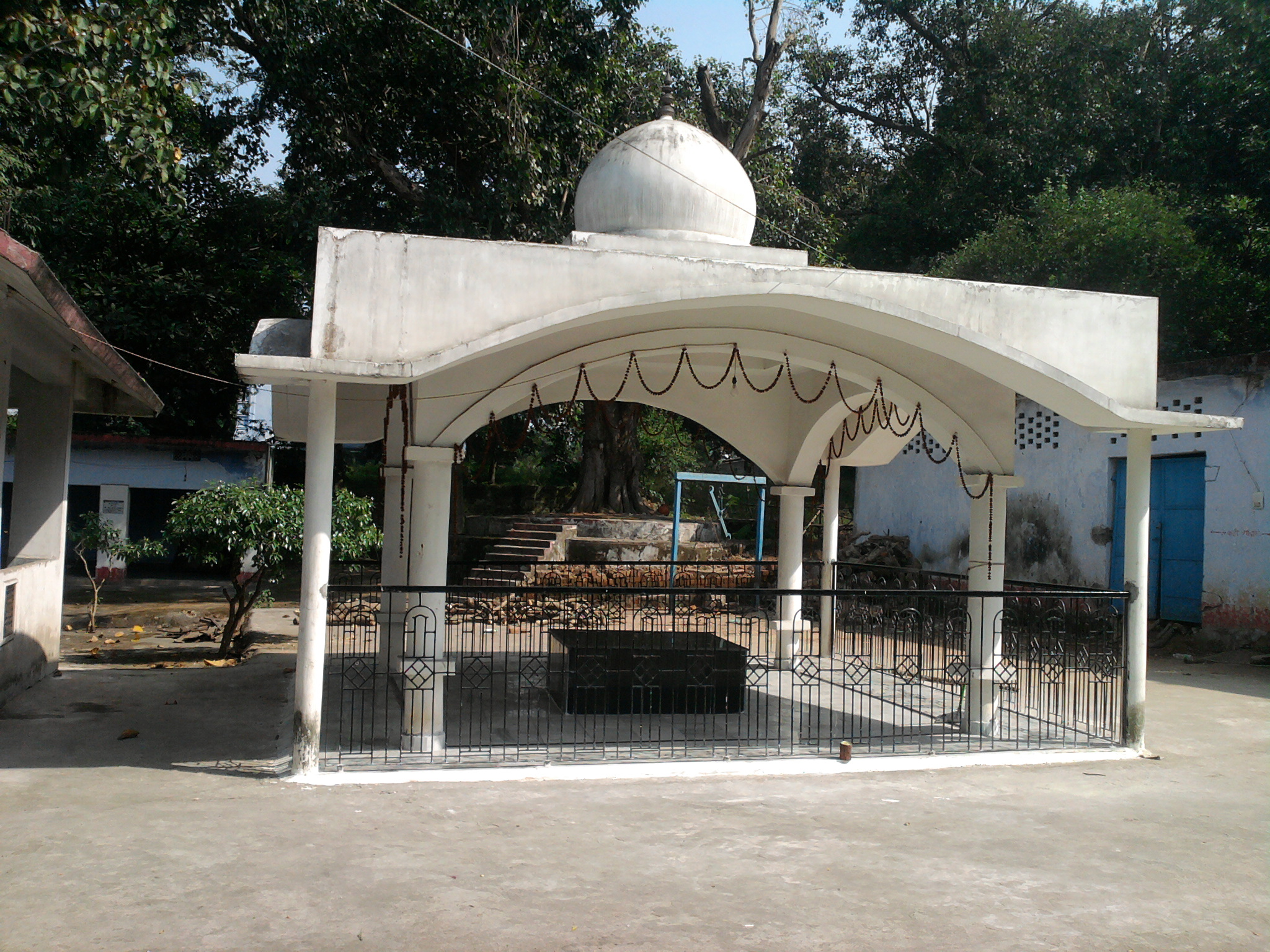
Mahatma Gandhi Samadhi Sathal, Ramgarh

This sthal popularly known as Gandhi Ghat is situated on the bank of river Damodar in Ramgarh. Mohandas K. Gandhi had visited Ramgarh in 1940 at the time of the Indian National Congress session at Ramgarh. After the assassination of Mahatma Gandhi in 1948, the pitcher containing the remains of the departed were dispatched to different places of the country including Ramgarh. A samadhi of Gandhiji was erected on it. Earlier, a fair used to be organized here on the occasion of the birthday and anniversary of Bapu but now this practice has been abandoned. The samadhi is made of black granite stones.

China Cemetery: Situated 5 km (3.1 mi) away from Ramgarh Cantonment, the China Kabristan (cemetery) is a famous historical monument. At the outbreak of World War II, some soldiers who rose up against Mao Zedong, the leader of the Chinese Cultural Revolution and who were also supporters of the friendly states, were captured and imprisoned at Ramgarh. After a few days the soldiers died of hunger and snakebites. A collective burial ground for the soldiers was made; there are a total of 667 graves. In the middle of the graveyard, a pillar in memory of Chiang Kai-shek was erected. The total area covered by the graveyard is around 7 acres (2.8 hectares). There is a Buddhist temple also in its vicinity. Three cantonments have come into existence around the graveyard. Inside the graveyard the pucca roads have been endorsed with rows of flowers. The China Kabristan is a material witness to the annals of the history of Ramgarh.

Megalithic sites of Ramgarh District: Ramgarh district is very rich in ancient and historical sites. Different megalith sites have been identified near Chitarpur, Gola and Kuju.

=== Nature tourism ===
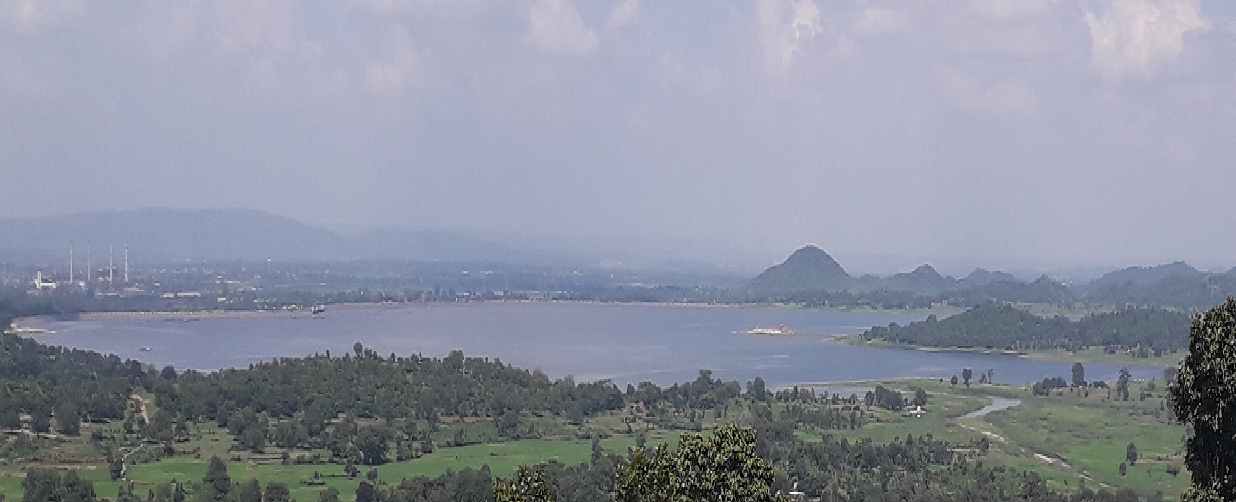
A view of Patratu Dam from the valley

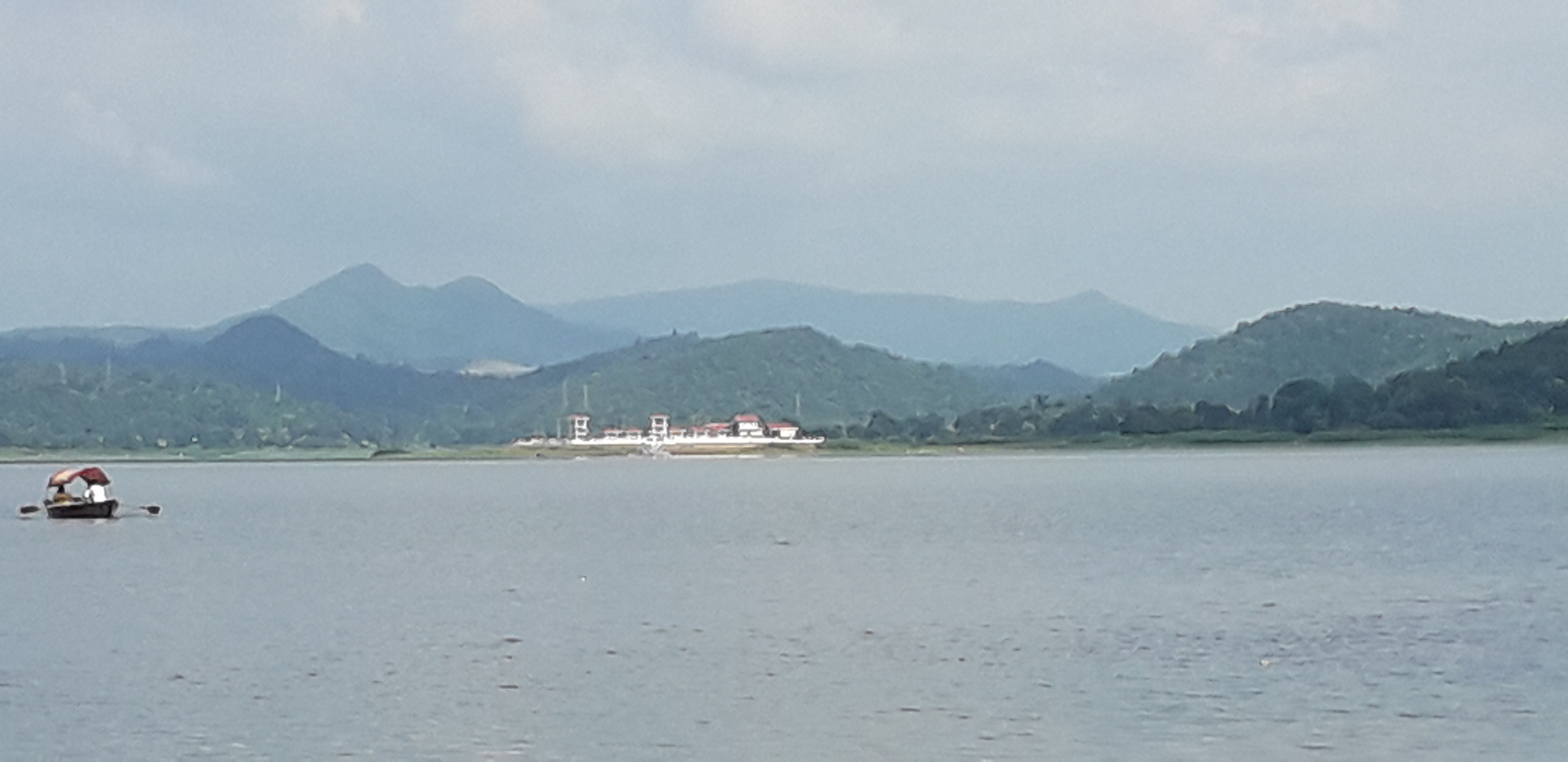
Nakari (Patratu) dam

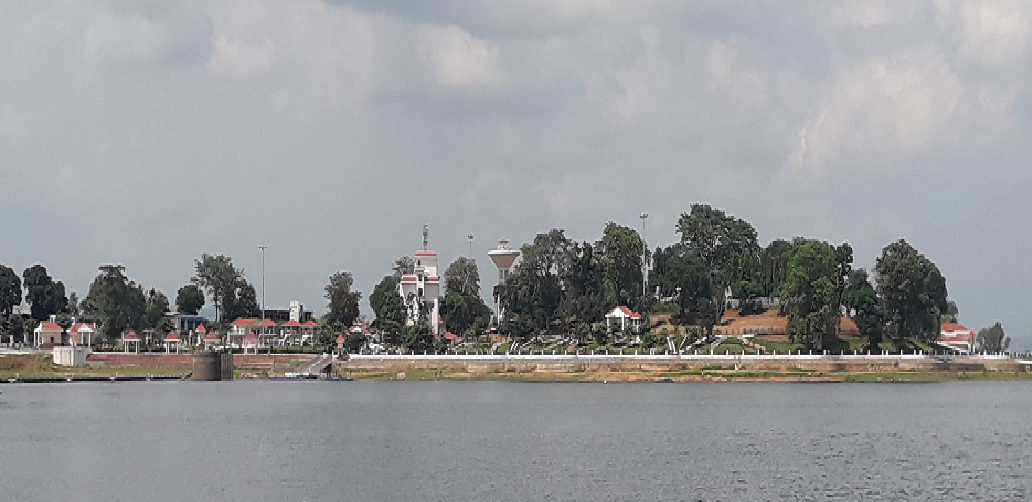
Patratu Dam Ghat

Patratu Dam or Nalkari Dam: Constructed on Nalkari and other small rivers; it is around 5 km (3.1 mi) from Patratu. Surrounded by hills, forest and rivers, Nalkari dam is used for picnicking and boating. The dam was constructed with the purpose of supplying water to Patratu Thermal Power Station. The total storage capacity of this dam is 81 square miles. Boating began on 14 January 2010 on the dam. Patratu dam is located 28 km from Ramgarh Cantonment and 35 km from Ranchi.

Dhur-duria Fall: Dhur-duria Fall is situated near Sidhwar village, about 4 km (2.5 mi) from Ramgarh Cantonment. The fall is created on the course of Sherbhuki river. The road only goes up to Sidhwar village, so an approach road should be constructed from Sidhwar village to fall. The water falls from approximately 50 ft (15 m) height.

Am-Jharia Fall: Situated near the border of Halwadi and Sidhwar village.

Nimi Fall: Nimi Fall is situated near Nimi village and around 5 km (3.1 mi) from Bhurkunda.

Dhara Fall: Dhara Fall is situated near Khakara village under Gola Block. The government is planning to construct an approach road from NH-23 (between Gola and Peterwar) to the fall.

Gandhaunia (Hindi: गंधौनिया (गरम पानी कुंड)): Situated at about 20 km (12 mi). near Mandu. It is a hot water spring (pond).

Chutupallu: Situated about 10 km (6.2 mi) from Ramgarh on the Ramgarh - Ranchi NH 33 is a hill top with many dhabas (roadside eateries) and motels in the way after crossing Chutupallu that offer food.

Bankhetta: Situated near Chutupallu. Water falls from a height giving the feeling of rainfall in a cave when someone claps inside.

Liril Fall: Situated between Ramgarh and Chutupallu, it looks like the fall from the old Liril soap advertisement. It is popularly known as Liril Fall.

Barso Paani: Situated at about 30 km (19 mi) from Ramgarh, near Charhi towards Hazaribagh. Water falls from the ceiling, giving the feeling of rainfall in a cave when someone claps.

Hundru Fall: The Hundru Fall located near the Ranchi-Ramgarh district border is created on the course of the Subarnarekha River.

== Politics ==
Lok Sabha Constituencies: Hazaribagh Vidhan Sabha Constituencies:

1. Ramgarh: Ramgarh Police Station (excluding G.Ps. Terpa, Patratu, Koto, Palani, Hapuhua, Harikarpur, Gegda, Deoria, Bargama, Pali, Salgo, Sanki, Jabo, Chaingari, Chikor, Lapanga, Ghutua, Barkakana and Sidhwar-Kalan) and Gola Police Station.
2. Mandu (Part): Mandu Police Stations.
3. Barkagaon (Part): G.Ps. Terpa, Patratu, Koto, Palani, Hapuhua, Harijarpu Gegda, Deoria, Bargama, Pali, Salgo, Sanki, Jabo, Chaingara, Chikor, Lapanga, Ghutua, Barkakana and Sidhwar-Kalan in Ramgarh Police Station.

District	No.	Constituency	Name	Party	Alliance	Remarks	Ramgarh	22	Barkagaon	Roshan Lal Choudhary
23	Ramgarh	Mamta Devi		INC	MGB		Ramgarh			

== See also ==
- Kaitha village
- List of chief ministers of Jharkhand
- South Karanpura Coalfield
