= List of state highways in Jharkhand =

Jharkhand has 1844.00 km of national highways, 1886.40 km of state highways, 4828.10 km of major district roads and 166.00 km of other roads, totalling 8724.50 km of roads in the state.

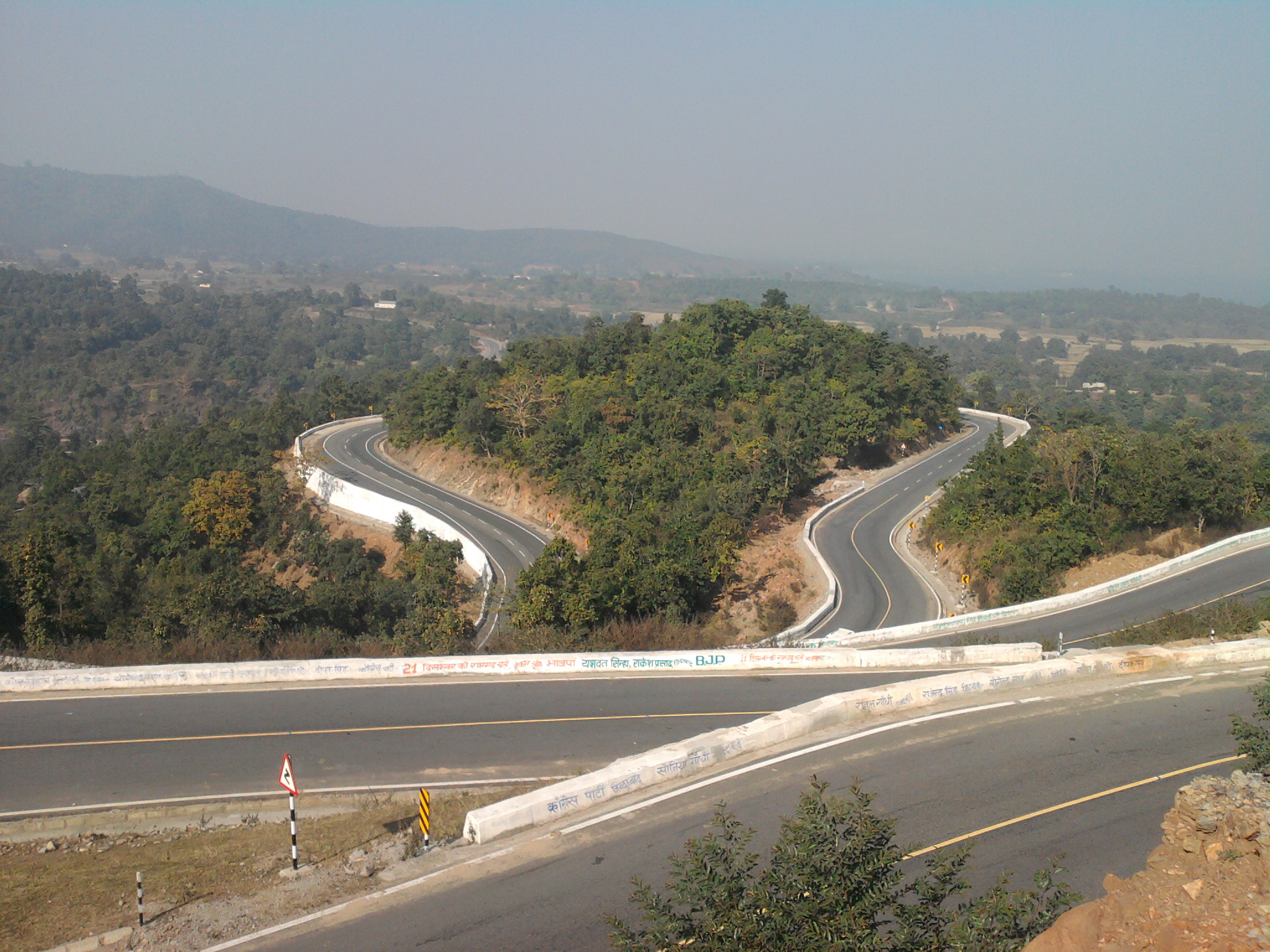
State Highway 2 between Patratu and Ranchi

== Expressways ==
List of expressways in Jharkhand is as follows:

- Six Corridors: DPR was being prepared for these in August 2022.
  - 1. East-West Corridor (Mudisemar-Dumka Expressway), 293 km, from Mudisemar, Chatra, Bengabad, Madhupur, Sarath, Palojori, Dumka.
  - 2. Eastern Corridor (Sahibganj-Chandil Expressway), 121 km, Sahibganj, Jamtara, Nirsa, Sindri, Chandankiyari to Chandil.
  - 3. North-South Corridor (Jhumri Talaiya- Expressway), 275 km, from Kodarma/Jhumri Telaiya, Antkadih, Bishungarh, Peterbar, Kasmar, Barlanga, Silli, Rargaon, Saraikela, Chaibasa to Jaintgrah.
  - 4. Central Corridor (Budhmu-Dobhi Expressway), 140 km, from Budhmu, Tandwa, Chatra, Hunterganj to Dobhi.
  - 5. Tourist Corridor (Milan Chowk-Chama Road Expressway), 270 km, Milan Chowk on Silli-Rangmati Road, Sarjamdih, Tamar, Khunti, Govindpur, Sisai, Gaghra, Netarhat, Garu, Saryu, Latehar, Herganj, Balumath, McCluskieganj to Chama Road.
  - 6. Holy Tourist Corridor (Ranchi-Deoghar Expressway), 170 km, Ranchi-Oramajhi-Gola Expressway continues from Gola to Rajrappa, Dumri, Giridih, Deoghar. It will connect Luguburu Hill, Parasnath Hill and Baidyanath Dham.
- 7. Raipur-Gumla-Ranchi-Dhanbad route (700 km).
  - Oramajhi-Gola-Jaina More Expressway, 28+32 km, Rs. 1214+1007 cr, greenfield
  - Rest brownfield upgrade
- 8. Ranchi-Sambalpur Expressway (Sambalpur-Ranchi Expressway), 206 km, Jharkhand to Odisha industrial corridor from Ranchi Ring Road to Litibeda (142 km) to Sambalpur greenfield, one of 44 economic corridors of NHAI.
- 9. Hazaribagh-Ranchi-Jamshedpur route:
  - 9a. Hazaribagh-Ranchi Expressway, NH-20, 4-lane, operational.
  - 9b. Ranchi–Jamshedpur Expressway, NH-43, 4-lane, operational.
- 10. Varanasi-Kolkata Expressway, greenfield, completion by 2025.
- 11. Haldia–Raxaul Expressway, greenfield, completion by 2025.
- 12. Patna-Kolkata Expressway, 450 km, greenfield, under Bharatmala-II, via Bihar (Rajgir & Nawada), Jharkhand (Giridih & Jamtara) & West Bengal (Durgapur & Bardhaman).

- Planned upgrades, not yet approved by MoRTH as of July 2023.
  - Robertsganj-Ramanujganj-Kusumi-Jashpur Nagar-Boda-Simdega with 2 spurs from Kusumi-Champa-Mahuadanar and Champa-Jairangi
  - Simdega-Tapkara-Pathalgaon
  - Raigarh-Sundergarh-Rourkela-Manoharpur-Chaibasa-Ghatshila-Chakulia-Dahijuri-Midnapore
  - Bhadrashahi-Barbil-Jagannathpur-Kuira-Kumardhungi-Bhagabila-Baida-Rairangpur-Bisoi
  - Jamshedpur-Rairangpur-Karanjia-Thakurmunda-Anandapur

== State highways ==
Jharkhand has a good network of state highways. It is listed below:

State highway No.	Route	Passes through - district(s)	Length (in km)
SH 1	Muri-Tati-Ranchi	Ranchi district	65
SH 2	Ramgarh Cantonment, Barkakana, Bhurkunda, Bhadani Nagar, Balkundra, Patratu, Hesla, Pithuriya, Kanke, Ranchi	Ramgarh district, Ranchi district	57
SH 3	Kolebira-Basia-Kamdara-Torpa-Khunti-Tamar	Simdega district, Gumla district, Khunti district, Ranchi district	109
SH 4	Kolebira-Bano-Barajamda-Noamundi-Haat Gamhariya	Simdega district, West Singhbhum district	112
SH 5	Chaibasa-Kandra-Chowka	Seraikela Kharsawan district	68.70
SH 6	Jugsalai-Purihasa-Hata	East Singhbhum district	21
SH 7	Hazaribagh, Barkagaon, Keredari, Tandwa, Khelari, Tangar/ Bijupada	Hazaribagh district, Chatra district, Ranchi district	130

== See also ==
- Expressways in India
