= Patratu (community development block) =

- Community development block
- Location in Jharkhand Patratu (India)
- Coordinates: 23.6645°N 85.3055°E
- Country: India
- State: Jharkhand
- District: Ramgarh

Government
  - Type: Federal democracy

Area
  - Total: 256.19 km^{2} (98.92 sq mi)
- Elevation: 508 m (1,667 ft)

Population (2011)
  - Total: 247,841
  - Density: 967.41/km^{2} (2,505.6/sq mi)

Languages
  - Official: Hindi, Urdu
- Time zone: UTC+5:30 (IST)
- PIN: 829118
- Telephone/ STD code: 0651
- Vehicle registration: JH
- Lok Sabha constituency: Hazaribagh
- Vidhan Sabha constituency: Ramgarh
- Website: ramgarh.nic.in

Patratu (community development block) is an administrative division in the Ramgarh subdivision of the Ramgarh district in the Indian state of Jharkhand.

== Maoist activities ==
Jharkhand is one of the states affected by Maoist activities. As of 2012, Ramgarh was not among the highly affected districts in the state. According to the Jharkhand Police spokesperson and Inspector General (IG) Saket Singh, as reported on 8 December 2020, "The activities of CPI-Maoist are now confined to small pockets in the state because of our efforts." Civilian fatalities, a key index of security in a region, declined from 20 in 2019, to 8 in 2020, the lowest in this category since 2000, when there were 13 such fatalities. The 28 total fatalities recorded in 2020 are also the lowest overall fatalities recorded in the state in a year since 2000, when they stood at 36.

== Geography ==
Patratu is located at 23.6645°N 85.3055°E. It has an average elevation of 508 metres (1,667 ft).

A major portion of the district is a part of the Damodar trough on the Chota Nagpur Plateau. The Ranchi Plateau, the largest part of the Chotanagpur Plateau is on the south and the Hazaribagh Plateau is on the north. The Damodar is the principal river of the district. The main tributaries of Damodar in the area are Naikari, Bhairavi/ Bhera and Bokaro. The Subarnarekha flows through the south-eastern part of the district. The Rajrappa falls and Naikari dam are important landmarks.

Patratu CD block is bounded by the Barkagaon and Dadi CD blocks in the Hazaribagh district on the north, the Ramgarh CD block on the east, the Burmu, Kanke and Ormanjhi CD blocks in Ranchi district on the south and Burmu CD block in Ranchi district on the west.

Patratu CD block has an area of 256.19 km^{2}. Patratu and Basal police stations serve Patratu CD block. The headquarters of Patratu CD block is located at Patratu town.

== Demographics ==
=== Population ===
According to the 2011 Census of India, Patratu CD block had a total population of 247,841, of which 92,822 were rural and 155,019 were urban. There were 129,469 (52%) males and 118,372 (48%) females. Population in the age range 0–6 years was 33,440. Scheduled Castes numbered 64,643 (26.08%) and Scheduled Tribes numbered 31,991 (12.91%).

Patratu, Saunda, Jainagar, Hesla, Balkundra, Lapanga and Barkakana are census towns in Patratu CD block.

=== Literacy ===
According to the 2011 census, the total number of literate persons in the Patratu CD block was 160,806 (75.00% of the population over 6 years) out of which males numbered 93,705 (83.49% of the male population over 6 years) and females numbered 67,101 (65.67% of the female population over 6 years). The gender disparity (the difference between female and male literacy rates) was 17.82%.

See also – List of Jharkhand districts ranked by literacy rate

Literacy in CD Blocks of
Ramgarh district
Patratu – 75.00%
Mandu – 72.68%
Ramgarh – 70.96%
Dulmi – 67.62%
Chitarpur – 78.60%
Gola – 65.35%
Source: 2011 Census: CD Block Wise
Primary Census Abstract Data

=== Language and religion ===
Religions in Patratu CD block (2011)
Religion	Percent
Hinduism	79.93%
Islam	12.48%
Sarna	5.75%
Christianity	1.32%
Sikhism	0.41%
Other or not stated	0.11%

Hindi is the official language in Jharkhand and Urdu has been declared as an additional official language.

Languages of Patratu CD block (2011)
1. Khortha (45.9%)
2. Hindi (25.4%)
3. Urdu (7.19%)
4. Magahi (5.32%)
5. Bhojpuri (5.02%)
6. Nagpuri (4.31%)
7. Bengali (1.37%)
8. Santali (1.10%)
9. Maithili (1.02%)
10. Kurukh (1.01%)
11. Others (2.38%)

At the time of the 2011 census, 45.87% of the population spoke Khortha, 25.41% Hindi, 7.19% Urdu, 5.32% Magahi, 5.02% Bhojpuri, 4.31% Nagpuri, 1.37% Bengali, 1.10% Santali, 1.02% Maithili and 1.01% Kurukh as their first language.

== Rural poverty ==
Ramgarh district was carved out of Hazaribagh district in 2007. In 2004–2005, 40-50% of the population of Hazaribagh district were in the BPL category, being in the same category as Godda, Giridih and Koderma districts. Rural poverty in Jharkhand declined from 66% in 1993–94 to 46% in 2004–05. In 2011, it has come down to 39.1%.

== Economy ==
=== Livelihood ===
Livelihood
in Patratu CD block
1. Cultivators (15.1%)
2. Agricultural labourers (12.1%)
3. Household industries (3.31%)
4. Other Workers (69.5%)

In the Patratu CD block in 2011, among the class of total workers, cultivators numbered 10,993 and formed 15.08%, agricultural labourers numbered 8,832 and formed 29.41%, household industry workers numbered 2,410 and formed 3.31% and other workers numbered 50,656 and formed 69.50%. Total workers numbered 72,891 and formed 29.41% of the total population, and non-workers numbered 174,950 and formed 70.59% of the population.

=== Infrastructure ===
There are 67 inhabited villages in Patratu CD block. In 2011, 46 villages had power supply. 3 villages had tap water (treated/ untreated), 66 villages had well water (covered/ uncovered), 64 villages had hand pumps, and all villages had drinking water facility. 6 villages had post offices, 5 villages had sub post offices, 9 villages had telephones (land lines), 26 villages had mobile phone coverage. 67 villages had pucca (paved) village roads, 9 villages had bus service (public/ private), 8 villages had autos/ modified autos, 15 villages had taxi/vans and 23 villages had tractors. 4 villages had bank branches. 27 villages had public distribution system, 7 villages had weekly haat (market) and 33 villages had assembly polling stations.

=== Coal mining ===
The projects of the Barka Sayal Area are: Bhurkunda underground, Central Saunda underground, Saunda D underground, Saunda underground, Sayal D underground, Urimari underground, North Urimari/ Birsa opencast, Bhurkunda opencast. The area office is at Sayal, PO Saunda.

=== Industries ===
Patratu Thermal Power Station at Patratu was initially built by the Russians and commissioned in 1966–72. Subsequently, 4×110 MW BHEL units were added. The plant has become old and operates at a derated capacity.

The foundation stone for the 800 x 5 MW Patratu Super Thermal Power Project was laid by Narendra Modi, Prime Minister, in 2018.

Patratu Dam, was built to supply water for the Patratu Thermal Power Station. It has been built across the Nalkarni River, a tributary of the Damodar River and has an 81 sq mi reservoir.

The Indo-Asahi Glass Company Limited, now IAG Glass Company Limited, has a glass factory at Bhadani Nagar. It has been modernised by Vijay Joshi, the present owner.

Jindal Steel and Power has set up a 0.6 million tonnes per year wire rod mill and a 1 million tonnes per year bar mill at Patratu.

== Transport ==
Barkakana Junction railway station came up early with the construction in 1927 of the Barkakana-Muri-Chandil line and the Barkakana–Netaji S.C.Bose Gomoh line. The line from Barkakana to Daltonganj came up in 1929 and ultimately became the Barkakana-Son Nagar line. The Koderma–Hazaribagh–Barkakana–Ranchi line became functional between Koderma and Barkakana in 2015 and 2016. The entire stretch was sanctioned in 1998–99. The Barkakana-Ranchi line has been delayed so much that even news about it is not published.

== Education ==
Patrartu CD block had 21 villages with pre-primary schools, 59 villages with primary schools, 36 villages with middle schools, 6 villages with secondary schools, 3 villages with senior secondary schools, 1 village with general degree college, 1 village with non-formal training centre.
.*Senior secondary schools are also known as Inter colleges in Jharkhand

== Healthcare ==
Patratu CD block had 2 villages with primary health centres, 15 villages with primary health subcentres, 1 village with maternity and child welfare centre, 1 village with allopathic hospital, 1 village with family welfare centre, 1 village with medicine shop.
.*Private medical practitioners, alternative medicine etc. not included
