= Lapanga, Ramgarh =

Lapanga
- Census Town
- Location in Jharkhand, India Lapanga (India)
- Coordinates: 23.6532°N 85.3925°E
- Country: India
- State: Jharkhand
- District: Ramgarh

Area
  - Total: 1.398 km^{2} (0.540 sq mi)

Population (2011)
  - Total: 8,017
  - Density: 5,735/km^{2} (14,850/sq mi)

Languages (*For language details see Patratu (community development block)#Language and religion)
  - Official: Hindi, Urdu
- Time zone: UTC+5:30 (IST)
- PIN: 829105
- Telephone/ STD code: 0651
- Vehicle registration: JH
- Lok Sabha constituency: Hazaribagh
- Vidhan Sabha constituency: Ramgarh
- Website: ramgarh.nic.in

Lapanga is a census town in the Patratu CD block in the Ramgarh subdivision of the Ramgarh district in the Indian state of Jharkhand.

== Geography ==
Cities, towns and locations in Ramgarh district in North Chotanagpur Division
M: municipality, CT: census town, R: rural/ urban centre, T: tourist centre, P: power plant
Abbreviation used- TPP: thermal power project
Owing to space constraints in the small map, the actual locations in a larger map may vary slightly

=== Location ===
Lapnaga is located at 23.6532°N 85.3925°E.

=== Area overview ===
Ramgarh has a vibrant coal-mining sector. The map alongside provides links to five operational areas of Central Coalfields spread across South Karanpura Coalfield, Ramgarh Coalfield and West Bokaro Coalfield. Four of the six CD blocks in the district have coal mines – Patratu, Ramgarh, Mandu and Chitarpur. The high concentration of census towns in these blocks are noticeable on the map. Only two blocks, Gola and Dulmi, are rural areas. Ramgarh district lies in the central part of the Chota Nagpur Plateau. The Damodar valley covers most of the district. The forested areas in highlands to the north and the south of the valley can be seen in the map (mark the shaded areas).

Note: The map alongside presents some of the notable locations in the district. All places marked in the map are linked in the larger full screen map.

== Demographics ==
According to the 2011 Census of India, Lapanga had a total population of 8,017, of which 4,193 (52%) were males and 3,824 (48%) were females. Population in the age range 0-6 years was 963. The total number of literate persons in Lapanga was 5,668 (80.35% of the population over 6 years).

== Infrastructure ==
According to the District Census Handbook 2011, Ramgarh, Lapanga covered an area of 1.398 km^{2}. Among the civic amenities, it had 10 km roads with open drains, the protected water supply involved uncovered well, hand pump. It had 1,250 domestic electric connections. Among the medical facilities, it had 4 hospitals, 6 dispensaries, 6 health centres, 9 family welfare centres, 7 maternity and child welfare centres, 9 maternity homes, 4 nursing homes, 1 medicine shop. Among the educational facilities it had 1 primary school, 1 middle school, other school facilities at Barkakana 9 km away. It had 1 non-formal educational centre (Sarva Siksha Abhiyan). Among the social, recreational and cultural facilities it had 1 stadium. One important commodity it produced was coal. It had the branch office of 1 nationalised bank.

== Transport ==
There is a station at Bhurkunda on the Barkakana-Son Nagar line.

Lapanga is off State Highway 2.
