= Ranchi Ring Road =

Road in Jharkhand, India

Route information
- Length: 86 km (53 mi)
- Existed: 2008; 17 years ago–present

Location
- Country: India
- State: Jharkhand
- Major cities: Ranchi

Highway system
- Roads in India; Expressways; National; State; Asian; State Highways in Jharkhand

Ranchi Ring Road is a 86 km long ring road encircling Ranchi, the capital of the Indian state of Jharkhand.
