= Sirka, India =

Sirka
- Census Town
- Location in Jharkhand, India Sirka (India)
- Coordinates: 23.6480°N 85.4298°E
- Country: India
- State: Jharkhand
- District: Ramgarh

Area
  - Total: 10.571 km^{2} (4.081 sq mi)

Population (2011)
  - Total: 19,871
  - Density: 1,879.8/km^{2} (4,868.6/sq mi)

Languages (*For language details see Ramgarh (community development block)#Language and religion)
  - Official: Hindi, Urdu
- Time zone: UTC+5:30 (IST)
- PIN: 829122
- Telephone/ STD code: 06553
- Vehicle registration: JH
- Lok Sabha constituency: Hazaribagh
- Vidhan Sabha constituency: Ramgarh
- Website: ramgarh.nic.in

Sirka is a census town in the Ramgarh CD block in the Ramgarh subdivision of the Ramgarh district in the Indian state of Jharkhand.

== Geography ==
Cities, towns and locations in Ramgarh district in North Chotanagpur Division
M: municipality, CT: census town, R: rural/ urban centre, T: tourist centre, P: power plant
Abbreviation used- TPP: thermal power project
Owing to space constraints in the small map, the actual locations in a larger map may vary slightly

=== Location ===
Sirka is a colliery township in South Karanpura Coalfield located at 23.6480°N 85.4298°E.

=== Area overview ===
Ramgarh has a vibrant coal-mining sector. The map alongside provides links to five operational areas of Central Coalfields spread across South Karanpura Coalfield, Ramgarh Coalfield and West Bokaro Coalfield. Four of the six CD blocks in the district have coal mines – Patratu, Ramgarh, Mandu and Chitarpur. The high concentration of census towns in these blocks are noticeable on the map. Only two blocks, Gola and Dulmi, are totally rural areas. Ramgarh district lies in the central part of the Chota Nagpur Plateau. The Damodar valley covers most of the district. The forested areas in highlands to the north and the south of the valley can be seen in the map (mark the shaded areas).

Note: The map alongside presents some of the notable locations in the district. All places marked in the map are linked in the larger full screen map.

== Demographics ==
According to the 2011 Census of India, Sirka had a total population of 19,871, of which 10,379 (52%) were males and 9,492 (48%) were females. Population in the age range 0–6 years was 2,815. The total number of literate persons in Sirka was 12,682 (74.36% of the population over 6 years).

As per 2011 Census of India, Ramgarh Urban Agglomeration had a total population of 132,441, of which males were 70,871 and females 61,562. Ramgarh Urban Agglomeration is composed of Ramgarh Cantonment (Cantonment Board), Sirka (Census Town), Marar (CT) and Barkakana (CT).

As per 2011 census the total number of literates in Ramgarh UA was 95,734 (82.97 per cent of total population) out of which 55,352 (89.57 percent of males) were males and 40,362 (75.35 percent of females) were females.

At the 2001 India census, Sirka had a population of 20,170. Males constituted 53% of the population and females 47%. Sirka had an average literacy rate of 57%, lower than the national average of 59.5%: male literacy was 66% and female literacy 46%. In Sirka, 14% of the population was under 6 years of age.

== Infrastructure ==
According to the District Census Handbook 2011, Ramgarh, Sirka covered an area of 10.571 km^{2}. Among the civic amenities, it had 40 km roads with open drains, the protected watersupply involved tapwater from treated sources, uncovered well, overhead tank. It had 3,753 domestic electric connections, 250 road lighting points. Among the medical facilities, it had 4 hospitals, 2 dispensaries, 2 health centres, 2 family welfare centres, 21 maternity and child welfare centres, 12 maternity homes, 12 nursing homes, 2 medicine shops. Among the educational facilities it had 5 primary schools, 2 middle schools, 2 secondary schools, the nearest senior secondary school, general degree college at Ramgarh Cantonment 12 km away. Among the social, recreational and cultural facilities it had 1 stadium, 1 auditorium/ community hall. Three important commodities it produced were coal, bricks, sand. It had the branch offices of 2 nationalised banks, 1 agricultural credit society, 1 non-agricultural credit society.

== Economy ==
Sirka open cast and underground mines are operational under Argada Area of Central Coalfields Limited.
