= Seraikela Sadar subdivision =

- Subdivision
- Location in Jharkhand, India Seraikela Sadar subdivision (India)
- Coordinates: 22.8012°N 85.9444°E
- Country: India
- State: Jharkhand
- District: Seraikela Kharsawan
- Headquarters: Seraikela

Area
  - Total: 1,644.32 km^{2} (634.88 sq mi)

Population
  - Total: 692,393
  - Density: 421.082/km^{2} (1,090.60/sq mi)

Demographic
  - Literacy rate: 67.70 %
  - Sex ratio: 958

Language
  - Official: Hindi and English
  - Regional: Bengali, Ho, Mundari, Odia and Santali
- Time zone: UTC+5:30 (IST)
- Website: seraikela.nic.in

Seraikela Sadar subdivision is an administrative subdivision of the Seraikela Kharsawan district in the Kolhan division in the state of Jharkhand, India.

== Administrative set up ==
Seraikela Kharsawan district has two subdivisions – (1) Seraikela Sadar subdivision with Seraikela, Kharsawan, Kuchai, Adityapur and Gobindpur CD blocks, and (2) Chandil subdivision with Chandil, Ichagarh, Kukru and Nimdih CD blocks.

The subdivisions of Seraikela Kharsawan district have the following distinctions:

Subdivision	Headquarters	Area km^{2}	Population (2011)	Rural population % (2011)	Urban population % (2011)
Seraikela Sadar	Seraikela	1,644.32	692,393	96.82	3.18
Chandil	Chandil	1,019.23	372,663	87.09	12.91

Note: Calculated on the basis of block-wise data available.

Cities, towns and locations in Seraikela Kharsawan district in Kolhan Division
M: municipality, R: rural/ urban centre, CT: census town, T: tourist centre
Owing to space constraints in the small map, the actual locations in a larger map may vary slightly

== Police stations ==
Police stations in Seraikela Sadar subdivision are at:

1. Adityapur
2. Gamharia
3. Kandra
4. Kharswan
5. Kuchai
6. Rajnagar
7. Seraikela
8. RIT PS
9. Traffic PS, Gamharia

== Blocks ==
Community development blocks in the Seraikela Sadar subdivision are:

CD Block	Headquarters	Area km^{2}	Population (2011)	SC %	ST %	Literacy rate %	CT
Adityapur	Adityapur	304.51	134,717	6.44	29.93	71.32	Kandra, Chota Gamahria
Gobindpur	Rajnagar	458.56	136,600	2.14	52.69	63.19	-
Kharsawan	Kharsawan	226.52	88,642	7.72	39.90	65.64	-
Kuchai	Kuchai	386.20	64,320	1.43	77.99	52.97	-
Seraikela	Seraikela	268.53	79,507	6.99	48.04	64.61	Sini

== Education ==
In 2011, in Seraikela Sadar subdivision out of a total 828 inhabited villages there were 82 villages with pre-primary schools, 727 villages with primary schools, 334 villages with middle schools, 51 villages with secondary schools, 25 villages with senior secondary schools, 101 villages with no educational facility.
.*Senior secondary schools are also known as Inter colleges in Jharkhand

=== Educational institutions ===
The following institutions are located in Seraikela Sadar subdivision:

- National Institute of Technology Jamshedpur, an Institute of National Importance established at Adityapur in 1960, has the status of a Deemed University.
- Srinath University is a private institution at Dindli, Adityapur with diverse educational programmes.
- Arka Jain University, is a private university at Mohanpur, Gamahria, established in 2011.
- Government Polytechnic, established at Adityapur in 1980, offers diploma courses in engineering.
- MSME Tool Room (Indo Danish Tool Room), Jamshedpur Main Centre, located at Gamharia, offers diploma, certificate and skill development programmes.
- XITE (Xavier Institute of Tribal Education) College was established at Gamharia by the Jamshedpur Jesuit Society in 2003.
- Kashi Sahu College was established at Seraikela in 1969.
- Model Mahila College at Kharsawan was established in 2016.

(Information about degree colleges with proper reference may be added here)

== Healthcare ==
In 2011, in Seraikela Sadar subdivision there were 14 villages primary health centres, 16 villages with primary health subcentres, 113 villages with maternity and child welfare centres, 15 villages with allopathic hospitals, 8 villages with dispensaries, 4 villages with veterinary hospitals, 6 villages with family welfare centres, 132 villages with medicine shops.
.*Private medical practitioners, alternative medicine etc. not included

=== Medical facilities ===
(Anybody having referenced information about location of government/ private medical facilities may please add it here)
