= State Highway 5 (Jharkhand) =

State highway in Jharkhand, India

State Highway 5

Route information
- Length: 68.70 km (42.69 mi)

Major junctions
- From: Chaibasa
- To: Chowka

Location
- Country: India
- State: Jharkhand
- Districts: Seraikela Kharsawan district

Highway system
- Roads in India; Expressways; National; State; Asian; State Highways in Jharkhand

State Highway 5 (SH 5) is a state highway in Jharkhand, India.

== Route ==
SH 5 originates at Chaibasa and passes through Saraikela and Kandra and terminates at its junction with National Highway 43 at Chowka.

The total length of SH 5 is 68.70 km.

== Road improvements ==
The entire highway is being improved. The Manikui bridge, across the Subarnarekha, which had collapsed in 2013 has been rebuilt.
