= Silli block =

Silli
- Community development block
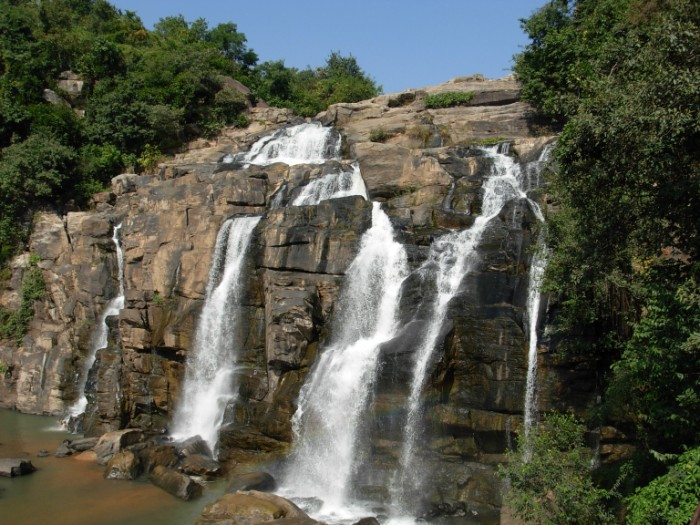
- Jonha Falls

- Coordinates: 23.352°N 85.836°E
- Country: India
- State: Jharkhand
- District: Ranchi

Government
  - Type: Federal democracy

Area
  - Total: 289.54 km^{2} (111.79 sq mi)

Population (2011)
  - Total: 113,798
  - Density: 393.03/km^{2} (1,017.9/sq mi)

Languages
  - Official: Hindi, Urdu
- Time zone: UTC+5:30 (IST)
- PIN: 835102
- Telephone/STD code: 06522
- Literacy: 73.73%
- Lok Sabha constituency: Ranchi
- Vidhan Sabha constituency: Silli
- Website: ranchi.nic.in

Silli is a CD block that forms an administrative subdistrict in the Ranchi Sadar subdivision of Ranchi district, in the Indian state of Jharkhand.

== Maoist activities, dissent ==
Jharkhand is one of the states affected by Maoist activities. As of 2012, Ranchi district was among the highly affected districts in the state. “Areas of Tamar, Bundu, Sonahatu, Angarha, Sikidari Police Stations and Rahe O.P. have been widely affected by activities of CPI (Maoist) group till the end of year 2009. At the end of year 2010, The activities of CPI (Maoist) group has been minimized up to almost zero level.”

According to the Jharkhand Police spokesperson and Inspector General (IG) Saket Singh, as reported on December 8, 2020, “The activities of CPI-Maoist are now confined to small pockets in the state because of our efforts.” Civilian fatalities, a key index of security in a region, declined from 20 in 2019, to 8 in 2020, the lowest in this category since 2000, when there were 13 such fatalities. The 28 total fatalities recorded in 2020 are also the lowest overall fatalities recorded in the state in a year since 2000, when they stood at 36.

Ranchi being the capital city of the state has always been under minute scrutiny of all. The arrest, from his home in Ranchi on October 9, 2020, by the NIA, of 83-years old Rev. Fr. Stan Swamy, S.J., Jesuit priest and activist, working with tribals for decades, and his subsequent death in custody, in a Mumbai hospital, on 5 July 2021, has been widely discussed.

== Geography ==
Silli is located in the southern part of the Chota Nagpur Plateau, and about 60 kilometers from the city of Ranchi. It has a hilly topography and its dense tropical forests a combination that produces a relatively moderate climate compared to the rest of the state.

Silli CD block is located on the Lower Chota Nagpur Plateau. It has an average elevation of 500–1,000 feet (150–300 m) above mean sea level.

Situated at an edge of the Ranchi plateau, the Jonha Falls (also known as Gautamdhara Falls) is an example of a hanging valley falls. The Gunga River hangs over its master stream, Raru River and forms the falls.

Silli CD block is bounded by the Gola CD block in Ramgarh district on the north, Jhalda I CD block in Purulia district of West Bengal on the east, Sonahatu CD block on the south and Rahe and Angara CD blocks on the west.

Silli CD block has an area of 289.54 km^{2}.Silli police station serves Silli CD block. The headquarters of Silli CD block is located at Silli village.

Although Silli has a humid subtropical climate, its location and the forests surrounding it combine to produce the unusually pleasant climate for which it's known. Summer temperatures range from 20 °C to 42 degrees, winter temperatures from 8 °C to 25 degrees. December and January are the coolest months, with temperatures dipping to the freezing point in some areas.

== Demographics ==
=== Population ===
According to the 2011 Census of India, Silli CD block had a total population of 113,798, of which 101,054 were rural and 12,744 were urban. There were 58,087 (51%) males and 55,711 (49%) females. Population in the age range 0–6 years was 15,320. Scheduled Castes numbered 6,555 (5.76%) and Scheduled Tribes numbered 28,292 (24.86%).

The percentage of Scheduled Tribes in Ranchi district, in 2011, was 47.67% of the population (rural) in the blocks. The percentage of Scheduled Tribes, numbering 1,042,016, in the total population of Ranchi district numbering 2,914,253 in 2011, was 35.76%. The Oraons forming 18.20% of the population and the Mundas forming 10.30% of the population, were the main tribes. Other tribes included (percentage of population in brackets) Lohra (2.46), Bedia (1.32) and Mahli (1.09).

The only census town in Silli CD block is (2011 population figure in brackets): Muri (12,744).

Large villages (with 4,000+ population) in Silli CD block are (2011 census figures in brackets): Lota (4,760), Silli (5,222) and Bantahajam (8,677).

=== Literacy ===
As of 2011 census, the total number of literate persons in Silli CD block was 72,611 (73.73% of the population over 6 years) out of which males numbered 43,018 (85.57% of the male population over 6 years) and females numbered 29,593 (61.39% of the female population over 6 years). The gender disparity (the difference between female and male literacy rates) was 24.18%.

As of 2011 census, literacy in Ranchi district was 77.13%. Literacy in Jharkhand was 67.63% in 2011. Literacy in India in 2011 was 74.04%.

See also – List of Jharkhand districts ranked by literacy rate

Literacy in CD Blocks of
Ranchi district
Ranchi Sadar subdivision
Burmu – 64.54%
Khelari – 74.83%
Kanke – 73.75%
Ormanjhi – 67.53%
Silli – 73.73%
Angara – 64.92%
Namkum – 73.72%
Ratu – 73.00%
Nagri – 71.59%
Mandar – 67.63%
Chanho – 66.81%
Bero – 67.49%
Itki – 73.58%
Lapung – 60.29%
Bundu subdivision
Rahe – 69.19%
Bundu – 66.38%
Sonahatu – 66.04%
Tamar – 62.76%
Source: 2011 Census: CD block Wise
Primary Census Abstract Data

=== Language and religion ===
Religions in Silli CD block (2011)
Religion	Percent
Hinduism	81.90%
Others*	12.94%
Islam	3.95%
Christianity	0.75%
Other or not stated	0.46%
*mainly tribal religions like Sarna

Hindi is the official language in Jharkhand and Urdu has been declared as an additional official language.

Languages of Silli block (2011)
1. Panchpargania (78.9%)
2. Bengali (10.2%)
3. Hindi (7.24%)
4. Mundari (1.05%)
5. Others (2.62%)

== Rural poverty ==
60-70% of the population of Ranchi district were in the BPL category in 2004–2005. In 2011-12, the proportion of BPL population in Ranchi district came down to 27.82%. According to a study in 2013 (modified in 2019), "the incidence of poverty in Jharkhand is estimated at 46%, but 60% of the scheduled castes and scheduled tribes are still below poverty line."

== Economy ==
=== Livelihood ===
Livelihood
in Silli CD block
1. Cultivators (38.8%)
2. Agricultural labourers (36.3%)
3. Household industries (3.79%)
4. Other Workers (21.1%)

In Silli CD block in 2011, amongst the class of total workers, cultivators numbered 21,059 and formed 38.78%, agricultural labourers numbered 19,705 and formed 36.29%, household industry workers numbered 2,059 and formed 3.79% and other workers numbered 11,480 and formed 21.14%. Total workers numbered 54,303 and formed 47.72% of the total population, and non-workers numbered 59,495 and formed 52.28% of the population.

=== Infrastructure ===
There are 94 inhabited villages in Silli CD block. In 2011, 5 villages had power supply. 14 villages had tap water (treated/ untreated), 62 villages had well water (covered/ uncovered), 61 villages had hand pumps, and 12 villages did not have drinking water facility. 15 villages had post offices, 9 villages had sub post offices, 6 villages had telephones (land lines), 46 villages had mobile phone coverage. 80 villages had pucca (paved) village roads, 25 villages had bus service (public/ private), 17 villages had autos/ modified autos, 11 villages had taxi/vans, 29 villages had tractors. 5 villages had bank branches, 8 villages had agricultural credit societies, 1 village had public distribution system, 86 villages had assembly polling stations.

=== Agriculture ===
In Ranchi district, 23% of the total area is covered with forests. “With the gradual deforestation of the district, more and more land is being brought under cultivation.” Terraced low lands are called don and the uplands are called tanr. The hill streams remain almost dry, except in the rainy season, and does not offer much scope for irrigation.

In Silli CD block, 24.34% of the total area was cultivable, in 2011. Out of this, 4.81% was irrigated land.

=== Industry ===
India’s first alumina refinery was commissioned, at Muri, by the erstwhile Indian Aluminium Company in 1948. It was taken over by the Hindalco Industries of the Aditya Birla Group in 2005.

=== Backward Regions Grant Fund ===
Ranchi district is listed as a backward region and receives financial support from the Backward Regions Grant Fund. The fund, created by the Government of India, is designed to redress regional imbalances in development. As of 2012, 272 districts across the country were listed under this scheme. The list includes 21 districts of Jharkhand.

== Transport ==
Muri Junction railway station is on the Barkakana-Muri-Chandil line.

There are stations at Muri and Silli on the Netaji S.C.Bose Gomoh–Hatia line.

State Highway 1 (Ranchi-Silli-Muri Road), an important roadway in Ranchi district, passes through Muri.

== Education ==
Silli CD block had 13 villages with pre-primary schools, 80 villages with primary schools, 37 villages with middle schools, 11 villages with secondary schools, 6 villages with senior secondary schools, 1 village has general degree college, 1 village with polytechnic, 1 village with special school for disabled, 13 villages with no educational facility.
.*Senior secondary schools are also known as Inter colleges in Jharkhand

Silli College, established in 1980 at Silli, is affiliated with Ranchi University and offers courses in arts, science and commerce.

== Healthcare ==
Silli CD block had 3 villages with primary health centres, 17 villages with primary health subcentres, 4 villages with maternity and child welfare centres, 5 villages with allopathic hospitals, 4 villages with dispensaries, 2 villages with family welfare centres, 3 villages with medicine shops.
.*Private medical practitioners, alternative medicine etc. not included

== Sports ==
Silli Stadium at Silli with a capacity of 20,000 is used mainly for football. It has synthetic turf which was laid by the organisation who had laid the synthetic turf for the Salt Lake Stadium at Kolkata.
