= Patratu Super Thermal Power Project =

Power plant in Jharkhand, India

Patratu Super Thermal Power Station
- Location of the Patratu Super Thermal Power Station
- Country: India
- Location: Patratu, Ramgarh district, Jharkhand
- Coordinates: 23.67°N 85.28°E
- Status: operational
- Construction began: May 2018
- Owner: NTPC

Thermal power station
- Primary fuel: Coal

Power generation
- Units operational: 2X 800 MW 1X800MW under construction 2 X 800 MW (Stage 2) planned
- Make and model: BHEL
- Nameplate capacity: 4,000 MW upcoming

Patratu Super Thermal Power Project is an operational power plant in India, with a current capacity of 1,600 MW (2 × 800 MW units).. It is, situated in Patratu, Ramgarh district, Jharkhand. It will use 1500 acres out of 6300 acres available with the existing Patratu Thermal Power Station.

== See also ==
- Jharkhand State Electricity Board
