= Gurusharan Lal Bhadani =

Indian industrialist and coal miner

Lala Gurusharan Lal Bhadani (1901–1955) was a noted industrialist and coal miner from Gaya, India.

Lala Gurusharan Lal was one of the noted industrialists of the Indian state of Bihar. His father, Rai Bahadur Ram Chand Ram Bhadani was also a noted businessman from Gaya. Lala Gurusharan Lall stepped into his shoes, and later emerged as India's upcoming industrialist. Lala Gurusharan Lal also inherited the Zamindari of village Lapanga, Ramgarh district from his father. He also owned a colliery there under the name of Hindustan Coal Company Ltd. Lapanga later came to be known as Bhadani Nagar.

In 1926 his first venture was Ram Chandra Naga Ram Rice & Oil Mills. In 1933 he founded Gaya Sugar Mills in 1937 Gaya Cotton & Jute Mills. But soon he felt that Gaya was a small place for business expansion in the field of industrialization and as such in 1941 he shifted his business activities to Calcutta by purchasing Sodepur Glass Works from Rai Bahadur Jagmal Raja. From Calcutta he extended his business activities to Bombay and in 1946 purchased Madhusudan Cotton Mills Limited. Apart from that, he was owner of several Sugar mills like Guraru and Warisaliganj Sugar Mills and famous Cotton Mills, Madhusudan Mills Bombay. In 1951, he founded the Indo-Ashai Glass Company Limited The controlling company was known as Bhadani Brother Limited. He served also as the Director of Sri Ram Group of Industries, Hindustan Commercial Bank Ltd., Bhadani Bros. Ltd. and was the Director in more than three dozen industries of Sugar, Cloths, Chemicals, Electricity, Rice & Pulses, and Share Exchange.

He was member of number of regional, national & international business associations. To name a few:- 1. All India Manufactures Association 2. Vice-President of Bihar Sugar Control Board. 3. Member of Executive Committee of Indian Chamber of Commerece. 4. President of Bihar Chamber of Commerce and Industries (1948–49) 4. Indian Central Sugarcane Committee 5. Indian Mining Association 6. International Chamber of Commerce 7. Panel of Sugar and Alcohol Feast, Delhi

In 1941 he was elected president of All India Sugar Mill Association and in 1946 he was elected the president of Federation of Indian Chamber of commerce and Industry. He was the first Bihari to have been elected as president of FICCI. He was appointed as the honorary trade adviser to the Government of Bihar in 1943, agent to the Government of India in 1944 and the President of Indian Chamber of Commerce in 1945. In appreciation of his brilliant service record; he was made the Knight Commander of the Indian Empire in 1945.

He also served as the trade adviser to the Government of Bihar, a member of the Mica Enquiry Committee. He represented India as its special representative in the conference of International Chamber of Commerce held in England in 1945.

As a philanthropist, he was the founder president of Gaya College, City School, and many other social and educational institutions. As a philanthropist, he, ˌkind-ˈheartedly extended donations in cash and kind to many other social organizations and educational institutions. He died in the year 1955.
