= Kharsawan =

Kharsawan Garh
- Town
- Location in Jharkhand, India Kharsawan Garh (India)
- Coordinates: 22°47′29″N 85°49′43″E
- Country: India
- State: Jharkhand
- District: Seraikela Kharsawan
- Elevation: 300 m (980 ft)

Population (2011)
  - Total: 5,793

Demographic
  - Literacy rate: 67.70 %
  - Sex ratio: 958

Language
  - Official: Hindi and English
  - Regional: Odia, Ho, Mundari, Bengali and Santali
- Time zone: UTC+5:30 (IST)
- PIN: 833216
- Telephone code: 06583
- Vehicle registration: JH 22
- Literacy: 78.05%
- Lok Sabha constituency: Khunti
- Vidhan Sabha constituency: Kharsawan
- Website: seraikela.nic.in

Kharsawan garh is a town and a notified area in the Seraikela Sadar subdivision of the Seraikela Kharsawan district in the Indian state of Jharkhand.

== History ==
Kharsawan (also spelled as Kharsuan) was founded around 1650. It was one of the Oriya Princely states of India during the period of the British Raj, and its last ruler signed the accession to India after India gained independence. In 1911, it was one of two states of the Chota Nagpur Division. It is now a part of Jharkhand state and one of its districts is named Seraikela Kharsawan district. Kumar Aditya Narayan Singh Deo and his father, Maharaj Kumar Rudra Pratap Singh Deo, appreciated the district's name change.

The Maharaja of Darbhanga used to visit this state to pay respects as the trade route to the east coast ran through the thick jungles of Singhbhum, and safety was guaranteed only to those who were in the good books. The title of Raja was granted to Kharsawan rulers in 1902, beginning with Raja Ram Chandra Singh Deo.

The state had a privy purse of 33,000 Rs. The present head of the royal family is Raja Gopal Narayan Singh Deo.

== Geography ==
Cities, towns and locations in Seraikela Kharsawan district in Kolhan Division
M: municipality, R: rural/ urban centre, CT: census town, T: tourist centre
Owing to space constraints in the small map, the actual locations in a larger map may vary slightly

=== Location ===
Kharsawan Garh is located at 22.79°N 85.82°E. It has an average elevation of 300 metres (1000 feet). It was also known as Kharsuangarh before the 1920s.

=== Area overview ===
The area shown in the map has been described as “part of the southern fringe of the Chotanagpur plateau and is a hilly upland tract”. 75.7% of the population lives in the rural areas and 24.3% lives in the urban areas.

Note: The map alongside presents some of the notable locations in the district. All places marked in the map are linked in the larger full screen map.

== Civic administration ==
There is a police station at Kharsawan.

The headquarters of Kharswan CD block are located at Kharsawan town.

== Demographics ==
According to the 2011 Census of India, Kharsawan had a total population of 5,793, of which 3,060 (53%) were males and 2,733 (47%) were females. Population in the age range 0–6 years was 723. The total number of literate persons in Kharsawan was 3,957 (78.05% of the population over 6 years).

(*For language details see Kharsawan block#Language and religion)

As of 2001 India census, Kharsawan had a population of 6790. Males constitute 52% of the population and females 48%. Kharsawan has an average literacy rate of 64%, higher than the national average of 59.5%: male literacy is 72%, and female literacy is 55%. In Kharsawan, 17% of the population is under 6 years of age.

== Education ==
Model Mahila College at Kharsawan was established in 2016. Affiliated with the Kolhan University, it offers undergraduate courses in Hindi, Odiya, Urdu, Ho, Kurmali, Mundari, English, political science, history, economics, philosophy, sociology, accountancy, business organisation and the principles of economy.

Government High School Kharsawan is a Hindi-medium coeducational institution established in 1948. It has facilities for teaching from class IX to class XII. The school has a playground and a library with 2,500 books.

Kasturba Gandhi Balika Vidyalaya is a Hindi-medium girls only institution established in 2007. It has facilities for teaching from class VI to class XII. The school has a playground and a library with 40 books, and has 9 computers for teaching and learning purposes.
