= State Highway 4 (Jharkhand) =

Road in Jharkhand, India

State Highway 4

Route information
- Length: 112 km (70 mi)

Major junctions
- From: Kolebira
- To: Haat Gamhariya

Location
- Country: India
- State: Jharkhand
- Districts: Simdega district, West Singhbhum district

Highway system
- Roads in India; Expressways; National; State; Asian; State Highways in Jharkhand

State Highway 4 (SH 4) is a state highway in Jharkhand, India.

== Route ==
SH 4 originates from its junction with National Highway 143 and State Highway 4 at Kolebira and passes through Bano, Barajamda, Noamundi and terminates at its junction with National Highway 20 at Haat Gamhariya.

The total length of SH 4 is 112 km.
