= Tamar, India =

Tamar
- Village
- Location in Jharkhand, India Tamar (India)
- Coordinates: 23.0544°N 85.6553°E
- Country: India
- State: Jharkhand
- District: Ranchi

Population (2011)
  - Total: 12,345

Languages (*For language details see Tamar block#Language and religion)
  - Official: Hindi, Urdu
- Time zone: UTC+5:30 (IST)
- PIN: 835225
- Telephone/ STD code: 06585
- Vehicle registration: JH 01
- Literacy: 68.96%
- Lok Sabha constituency: Khunti
- Vidhan Sabha constituency: Tamar
- Website: ranchi.nic.in

Tamar is a village in the Tamar CD block in the Bundu subdivision of the Ranchi district in the Indian state of Jharkhand.

== Geography ==
Cities, towns and locations in Ranchi district in South Chotanagpur Division
M: municipality, CT: census town, R: rural/ urban centre, N: neighbourhood, T: tourist centre, D: dam, H: historical/ religious centre
Owing to space constraints in the small map, the actual locations in a larger map may vary slightly

=== Location ===
Tamar is located at 23.0544°N 85.6553°E.

=== Area overview ===
The map alongside shows a part of the Ranchi plateau, most of it at an average elevation of 2,140 feet (650 m) above sea level. Only a small part in the north-eastern part of the district is the lower Ranchi plateau, spread over Silli, Rahe, Sonahatu and Tamar CD blocks, at an elevation of 500–1,000 feet (150–300 m) feet above sea level. There is a 16 kilometres (9.9 mi) long ridge south-west of Ranchi. There are isolated hills in the central plateau. The principal river of the district, the Subarnarekha, originates near Ratu, flows in an easterly direction and descends from the plateau, with a drop of about 300 feet (91 m) at Hundru Falls. Subarnarekha and other important rivers are marked on the map. The forested area is shaded in the map. A major part of the North Karanpura Area and some fringe areas of the Piparwar Area of the Central Coalfields Limited, both located in the North Karanpura Coalfield, are in Ranchi district. There has been extensive industrial activity in Ranchi district, since independence. Ranchi district is the first in the state in terms of population. 8.83% of the total population of the state lives in this district - 56.9% is rural population and 43.1% is urban population.

Note: The map alongside presents some of the notable locations in the district. All places marked in the map are linked in the larger full screen map.

== Civic administration ==
=== Police station ===
There is a police station at Tamar.

=== CD block HQ ===
The headquarters of Tamar CD block are located at Tamar village.

== Demographics ==
According to the 2011 Census of India, Tamar had a total population of 12,345, of which 6,312 (51%) were males and 6,033 (49%) were females. Population in the age range 0–6 years was 1,779. The total number of literate persons in Tamar was 7,286 (68.96% of the population over 6 years).

== Transport ==
National Highway 43 (earlier NH 33) (Ranchi-Bundu-Tamar-Chandil-Jamshedpur), an important roadway in Ranchi district, passes through Tamar. Tamar is one of the terminal points of State Highway 3.

== Education ==
Government High School is a Hindi-medium coeducational high school established in 1949. It has facilities for teaching from class IX to class XII. It has a playground and a library with 927 books.

Project High School is a Hindi-medium girls only institution established in 1980. It has facilities for teaching from class VIII to class X. It has a library with 25 books.

Government ST Residential Girls High School is a Hindi-medium girls only institution established in 1981. It has facilities for teaching from class I to class X. It has a library with 1,800 books and has 5 computers for teaching and learning purposes.
