= State Highway 3 (Jharkhand) =

Road in Jharkhand, India

State Highway 3

Route information
- Length: 109 km (68 mi)

Major junctions
- From: Kolebira
- To: Tamar

Location
- Country: India
- State: Jharkhand
- Districts: Simdega district, Gumla district, Khunti district, Ranchi district

Highway system
- Roads in India; Expressways; National; State; Asian; State Highways in Jharkhand

State Highway 3 (SH 3) is a state highway in Jharkhand, India.

== Route ==
SH 3 originates from its junction with National Highway 143 and State Highway 4 at Kolebira and passes through Basia, Kamdara, Torpa, Khunti and terminates at its junction with National Highway 43 at Tamar.

The total length of SH 3 is 109 km.
