= Kuchai =

- Village
- Location in Jharkhand, India Kuchai (India)
- Coordinates: 22.8382258°N 85.7389874°E
- Country: India
- State: Jharkhand
- District: Seraikela Kharsawan

Government
  - Type: Federal democracy

Population (2011)
  - Total: 1,315

Languages *
  - Official: Hindi, Ho
- Time zone: UTC+5:30 (IST)
- PIN: 833216
- Telephone/ STD code: 06583
- Vehicle registration: JH 22
- Literacy: 64.34%
- Lok Sabha constituency: Khunti
- Vidhan Sabha constituency: Kharsawan
- Website: seraikela.nic.in

Kuchai is a village in the Kuchai CD block in the Seraikela Sadar subdivision of the Seraikela Kharsawan district in the Indian state of Jharkhand.

== Geography ==
Cities, towns and locations in Seraikela Kharsawan district in Kolhan Division
M: municipality, R: rural/ urban centre, CT: census town, T: tourist centre
Owing to space constraints in the small map, the actual locations in a larger map may vary slightly

=== Location ===
Kuchai is located at 22.7217°N 85.8063°E.

=== Area overview ===
The area shown in the map has been described as "part of the southern fringe of the Chotanagpur plateau and is a hilly upland tract". 75.7% of the population lives in the rural areas and 24.3% lives in the urban areas.

Note: The map alongside presents some of the notable locations in the district. All places marked in the map are linked in the larger full screen map.

== Civic administration ==
There is a police station at Kuchai.

The headquarters of Kuchai CD block are located at Kuchai village.

== Demographics ==
According to the 2011 Census of India, Kuchai had a total population of 1,315, of which 738 (56%) were males and 577 (44%) were females. Population in the age range 0–6 years was 185. The total number of literate persons in Kuchai was 727 (64.34% of the population over 6 years).

(*For language details see Kuchai block#Language and religion)

== Transport ==
Rajkharsawan railway station on the Tatanagar-Bilaspur section of the Howrah-Nagpur-Mumbai line is located nearby.

== Education ==
Government High School Kuchai is a Hindi-medium coeducational institution established in 1979. It has facilities for teaching from class IX to class XII. The school has a playground and a library with 1,100 books.

Project Balika High School Kuchai is a Hindi-medium girls only institution established in 1982. It has facilities for teaching in classes IX and X. The school has a library with 100 books.

Model School Kuchai is an English-medium coeducational institution established in 2012. It has facilities for teaching from class VI to class XII.
