= Jharkhand Bijli Vitran Nigam Limited =

State-owned utility company in Jharkhand state, India

Jharkhand Bijli Vitran Nigam Limited (JBVNL)
- Formerly: Jharkhand State Electricity Board (JSEB)
- Type: Statutory body
- Industry: Generation & distribution of electricity
- Founded: 23 October 2013
- Headquarters: Engineering Building, H.E.C, Dhurwa, Ranchi, India, 834004
- Area served: Jharkhand
- Key people: Avinash Kumar, IAS (Managing Director)
- Owner: Government of Jharkhand
- Parent: Department of Energy, Jharkhand
- Website: jbvnl.co.in

Jharkhand Bijli Vitran Nigam Limited (JBVNL), formerly Jharkhand State Electricity Board (JSEB) is a Government of Jharkhand enterprise, entrusted with the generation and distribution of electrical power in the state of Jharkhand, India. It suffers a loss of more than ₹1,000 crore (US$200mn) every year.

JSEB was established on March 10, 2001, under the Electricity (Supply) Act, 1948, resulted from the bifurcation of Bihar. In 2011, it was revealed that in the last ten years, as much as ₹80 crores in outstanding dues to various units had been waived. Former Chief Minister Madhu Koda, in prison for graft since 2008, waived of a ₹10 crore bill from a company owned by fellow minister Vinod Sinha, who is also in jail on graft charges.

JBVNL was incorporated on October 23, 2013, and commenced operations on January 6, 2014.

== Power Plants ==
- Patratu Thermal Power Station. It has an installed capacity of 840 MW. The generating units of the power plant are very old and is operating at around 10% PLF. The power plant is undergoing renovation.
- Subernrekha Hydel Power Station, Sikidiri, a 130 MW (2x65 MW) hydel power plant.

== See also ==
- Patratu Super Thermal Power Project
- Bihar State Electricity Board
