= Bhadani Nagar =

Bujurg Jamira Jamira
- Town
- Location in Jharkhand, India Bujurg Jamira (India)
- Coordinates: 23.62°N 85.48°E
- Country: India
- State: Jharkhand

Languages (*For language details see Patratu (community development block)#Language and religion)
  - Official: Hindi, Khortha
- Time zone: UTC+5:30 (IST)
- PIN: 829102
- Telephone/ STD code: 06553
- Vehicle registration: JH
- Lok Sabha constituency: Hazaribagh
- Vidhan Sabha constituency: Ramgarh
- Website: ramgarh.nic.in

Bujurg Jamira is a town in the Patratu CD block in the Ramgarh subdivision of the Ramgarh district in the Indian state of Jharkhand.

== Etymology ==
The town was named after the great industrialist the late Lala Gurusharan Lal Bhadani. It was planned and established in the mid-20th century as an industrial township.

== Geography ==
Cities, towns and locations in Ramgarh district in North Chotanagpur Division
M: municipality, CT: census town, R: rural/ urban centre, T: tourist centre, P: power plant
Abbreviation used- TPP: thermal power project
Owing to space constraints in the small map, the actual locations in a larger map may vary slightly

=== Location ===
Bhadani Nagar is located at 23.62°N 85.48°E.

=== Area overview ===
Ramgarh has a coal-mining sector. The map alongside provides links to five operational areas of Central Coalfields spread across South Karanpura Coalfield, Ramgarh Coalfield and West Bokaro Coalfield. Four of the six CD blocks in the district have coal mines – Patratu, Ramgarh, Mandu and Chitarpur. The high concentration of census towns in these blocks are noticeable on the map. Only two blocks, Gola and Dulmi, are totally rural areas. Ramgarh district lies in the central part of the Chota Nagpur Plateau. The Damodar valley covers most of the district. The forested areas in highlands to the north and the south of the valley can be seen in the map (mark the shaded areas).”Chotanagpur has a charm of its own… The entire area forms one of the most charming series of views imaginable. The far-off hills in the background in exquisite tints of blue or purple as the light falls, the nearer hills picturesquely shaped and luxuriant in every shade of green with their bold escarpments in black or grey, and the brown plains below furnishing their quota of colours.”

Note: The map alongside presents some of the notable locations in the district. All places marked in the map are linked in the larger full screen map.

== Civic administration ==
There is a Police Outpost at Bhadani Nagar.

== Economy ==
The Indo-Asahi Glass Company Limited, now IAG Glass Company Limited, has a glass factory at Bhadani Nagar. It has been modernised by Vijay Joshi, the present owner.

== Transport ==
Bhadani Nagar is on State Highway 2. Barkakana Junction railway station is located nearby.
