= Hesla, Ramgarh =

Hesla
- Census Town
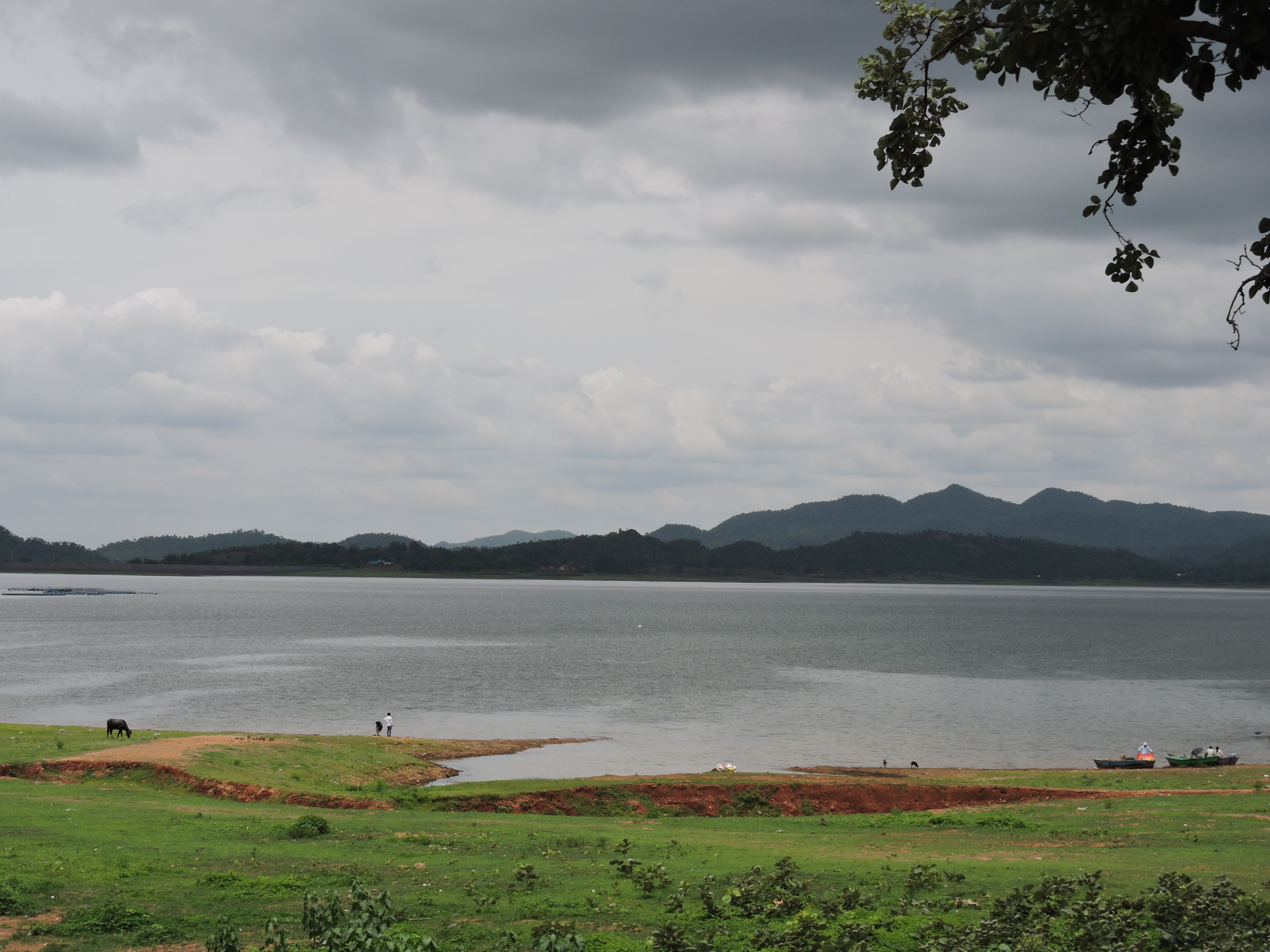
- Patratu Dam reservoir

- Location in Jharkhand, India Hesla (India)
- Coordinates: 23.6203°N 85.2838°E
- Country: India
- State: Jharkhand
- District: Ramgarh

Area
  - Total: 0.79 km^{2} (0.31 sq mi)

Population (2011)
  - Total: 4,451
  - Density: 5,600/km^{2} (15,000/sq mi)

Languages (*For language details see Patratu (community development block)#Language and religion)
  - Official: Hindi, Urdu
- Time zone: UTC+5:30 (IST)
- PIN: 829101
- Telephone/ STD code: 0651
- Vehicle registration: JH
- Lok Sabha constituency: Hazaribagh
- Vidhan Sabha constituency: Ramgarh
- Website: ramgarh.nic.in

Hesla is a census town in the Patratu CD block in the Ramgarh subdivision of the Ramgarh district in the Indian state of Jharkhand.

== Geography ==
Cities, towns and locations in Ramgarh district in North Chotanagpur Division
M: municipality, CT: census town, R: rural/ urban centre, T: tourist centre, P: power plant
Abbreviation used- TPP: thermal power project
Owing to space constraints in the small map, the actual locations in a larger map may vary slightly

=== Location ===
Hesla is located at 23.6203°N 85.2838°E.

=== Area overview ===
Ramgarh has a vibrant coal-mining sector. The map alongside provides links to five operational areas of Central Coalfields spread across South Karanpura Coalfield, Ramgarh Coalfield and West Bokaro Coalfield. Four of the six CD blocks in the district have coal mines – Patratu, Ramgarh, Mandu and Chitarpur. The high concentration of census towns in these blocks are noticeable on the map. Only two blocks, Gola and Dulmi, are totally rural areas. Ramgarh district lies in the central part of the Chota Nagpur Plateau. The Damodar valley covers most of the district. The forested areas in highlands to the north and the south of the valley can be seen in the map (mark the shaded areas).

Note: The map alongside presents some of the notable locations in the district. All places marked in the map are linked in the larger full screen map.

== Demographics ==
According to the 2011 Census of India, Hesla had a total population of 4,451, of which 2,335 (52%) were males and 2,116 (48%) were females. Population in the age range 0-6 years was 519. The total number of literate persons in Hesla was 3,389 (86.16% of the population over 6 years).

== Infrastructure ==
According to the District Census Handbook 2011, Ramgarh, Hesla covered an area of 0.79 km^{2}. Among the civic amenities, it had 10 km roads with open drains, the protected water supply involved tap water from treated sources, overhead tanks. It had 923 domestic electric connections. Among the medical facilities, it had 2 hospitals, 9 dispensaries, 9 health centres, 7 family welfare centres, 5 maternity and child welfare centres, 6 maternity homes, 3 nursing homes, 5 medicine shops. Among the educational facilities it had 8 primary schools, 3 middle schools, 2 secondary schools, 1 senior secondary school, 1 general degree college. Among the social, recreational and cultural facilities it had 1 stadium, 1 auditorium/ community hall. One important commodity it produced was coal.

== Industry ==
Burnpur Cement has set up nearby an 800 tonnes per day clinkerisation and cement grinding unit in Patratu Industrial Area.

Patratu Dam, was built to supply water for the Patratu Thermal Power Station. It has been built across the Nalkarni River, a tributary of the Damodar River and has an 81 sq mi reservoir.

== Transport ==
Hesla is on State Highway 2.
