= Muri, Ranchi =

Muri
- Census Town
- Location in Jharkhand, India Muri (India)
- Coordinates: 23.3845°N 85.8616°E
- Country: India
- State: Jharkhand
- District: Ranchi

Government
  - Type: Federal democracy

Area
  - Total: 5.717 km^{2} (2.207 sq mi)

Population (2011)
  - Total: 12,744
  - Density: 2,229/km^{2} (5,773/sq mi)

Languages
  - Official: Hindi, Urdu
- Time zone: UTC+5:30 (IST)
- PIN: 835101
- Telephone/STD code: 06522
- Vehicle registration: JH 1
- Literacy: 85.45%
- Lok Sabha constituency: Ranchi
- Vidhan Sabha constituency: Silli
- Website: ranchi.nic.in

Muri is a census town in the Silli CD block in the Ranchi Sadar subdivision of Ranchi district in the Indian state of Jharkhand. It is an important railway junction and is famous for Hindalco's alumina refinery.

== Geography ==
Cities, towns and locations in Ranchi district in South Chotanagpur Division
M: municipality, CT: census town, R: rural/ urban centre, N: neighbourhood, T: tourist centre, D: dam, H: historical/ religious centre
Owing to space constraints in the small map, the actual locations in a larger map may vary slightly

=== Location ===
Muri is located at 23.3845°N 85.8616°E.

Muri is also divided into two parts Chota Muri and Bara Muri. It is located on the bank of Subarnarekha River and its tributary river Orang Gadda. There are many parks like Muri Tungri Park, Deer Park, Audio Visual Park, Ambedkar Park are located here.

The Subarnarekha River forms the boundary with Purulia district in West Bengal before flowing through Seraikela Kharsawan district.

=== Area overview ===
The map alongside shows a part of the Ranchi plateau, most of it at an average elevation of 2,140 feet above sea level. Only a small part in the north-eastern part of the district is the lower Ranchi plateau, spread over Silli, Rahe, Sonahatu and Tamar CD blocks, at an elevation of 500 to 1,000 feet above sea level. There is a 16 km long ridge south-west of Ranchi. There are isolated hills in the central plateau. The principal river of the district, the Subarnarekha, originates near Ratu, flows in an easterly direction and descends from the plateau, with a drop of about 300 feet at Hundru Falls. Subarnarekha and other important rivers are marked on the map. The forested area is shaded in the map. A major part of the North Karanpura Area and some fringe areas of the Piparwar Area of the Central Coalfields Limited, both located in the North Karanpura Coalfield, are in Ranchi district. There has been extensive industrial activity in Ranchi district, since independence. Ranchi district is the first in the state in terms of population. 8.83% of the total population of the state lives in this district - 56.9% is rural population and 43.1% is urban population.

Note: The map alongside presents some of the notable locations in the district. All places marked in the map are linked in the larger full screen map.

== Demographics ==
According to the 2011 Census of India, Muri had a total population of 12,744, of which 6,589 (52%) were males and 6.155 (48%) were females. Population in the age range 0–6 years was 1,524. The total number of literate persons in Muri was 9,588 (85.45% of the population over 6 years).

As of 2001 India census, Muri had a population of 11,999. Males constitute 53% of the population and females 47%. Muri has an average literacy rate of 73%, higher than the national average of 59.5%: male literacy is 82%, and female literacy is 62%. In Muri, 12% of the population is under 6 years of age.

=== Languages ===
Languages spoken in Muri Town (2011)
1. Santali (39.6%)
2. Hindi (32.1%)
3. Bengali (16.4%)
4. Urdu (2.16%)
5. Bhojpuri (2.12%)
6. Odia (1.29%)
7. Others (6.27%)

== Civic administration ==
=== Police outpost ===
There is a police outpost at Muri.

== Education ==
Indal High School is a Hindi-medium coeducational institution established in 1948. It has facilitated for teaching from class I to class XII. It has a playground, a library with 4,000 books, and has 15 computers for teaching and learning purposes.

Ursuline English-medium School is an English-medium coeducational institution established in 1971. It has facilities for teaching from class I to class X. It has a playground, a library with 6,000 books, and has 26 computers for teaching and learning purposes.

Adarsh High School is a Hindi-medium coeducational school established in 1969. It has facilities for teaching in classes IX and X. It has a library with 486 books and has 4 computers for teaching and learning purposes.

Silli College, established in 1980 at Silli, is affiliated with Ranchi University and offers courses in arts, science and commerce.

== Industry ==
India’s first alumina refinery was commissioned at Chota Muri, 65 km from Ranchi, by the erstwhile Indian Aluminium Company in 1948. It was taken over by the Hindalco Industries of the Aditya Birla Group in 2005. The initial capacity of the aluminium refinery at 4 KPTA has been raised to 450 KPTA. There is a captive coal-based cogeneration power plant.

== Infrastructure ==
According to the District Census Handbook 2011, Ranchi, Muri covered an area of 5.717 km^{2}. Among the civic amenities, it had 25 km roads with open drains, the protected water supply involved tap water from treated source, uncovered well, overhead tank. It had 1,799 domestic electric connections, 210 road lighting points. Among the medical facilities, it had 2 hospitals, 2 dispensaries, 2 health centres, 1 family welfare centre, 2 maternity and child welfare centres, 2 maternity homes, 1 nursing home, 4 medicine shops. Among the educational facilities it had 7 primary schools, 6 middle schools, 2 secondary schools, 2 senior secondary schools, the nearest general degree college at Silli 5 km away. It had 1 non-formal educational centre (Sarva Siksha Abhiyan). Among the social, recreational and cultural facilities it had 1 stadium, 1 cinema theatre. Three important commodities it produced were aluminium powder, bamboo items, leaf plate. It had the branch offices of 3 nationalised banks, 1 agricultural credit society, 1 non-agricultural credit society.

== Transport ==
Muri Junction railway station is on the Barkakana-Muri-Chandil line. There are stations at Muri and Silli on the Netaji S.C.Bose Gomoh–Hatia line.

State Highway 1 (Ranchi-Silli-Muri Road), an important roadway in Ranchi district, passes through Muri.
