= Silli Stadium =

Building in India

Coordinates: 23.362°N 85.851°E

- Interactive map of Silli Stadium
- Location: Silli, Ranchi district
- Capacity: 20,000
- Surface: Syntetic turf

Silli Stadium is a stadium in Silli, which is 55 km from Ranchi, Jharkhand. It is mainly used for football matches.

Silli Stadium has a capacity of 20,000. The synthetic turf here was laid by the same organisation that had laid the synthetic turf at the Salt Lake Stadium at Kolkata and many other major stadiums.

In 2013, Indian cricket team skipper Mahendra Singh Dhoni displayed his footballing skills as he scored a goal during a friendly match. He played a 35-minute friendly football match at former deputy chief minister Sudesh Mahto’s assembly constituency. He teamed up with Mahto to play against a local soccer academy team at the Silli stadium.

Dhoni and Mahto scored a goal each as their team swept past their young rivals 4–1 in the friendly tie before a capacity crowd.
