= State Highway 1 (Jharkhand) =

State Highway in India

State Highway 1

Route information
- Length: 65 km (40 mi)

Major junctions
- From: Muri
- To: Ranchi

Location
- Country: India
- State: Jharkhand
- Districts: Ranchi district

Highway system
- Roads in India; Expressways; National; State; Asian; State Highways in Jharkhand

State Highway 1 (SH 1) is a state highway in Jharkhand, India.

== Route ==
SH 1 originates from its junction with State Highway 4A (West Bengal) at Jhalda / Muri and passes through Silli, Tati, Namkum and terminates at its junction with National Highway 20 at Ranchi.

The total length of SH 1 is 65 km.
