= Silli =

- Village
- Location in Jharkhand, India Silli (India)
- Coordinates: 23.3503°N 85.8513°E
- Country: India
- State: Jharkhand
- District: Ranchi

Population (2011)
  - Total: 5,222

Languages (*For language details see Silli block#Language and religion)
  - Official: Hindi, Kudmali
- Time zone: UTC+5:30 (IST)
- PIN: 835102
- Telephone/ STD code: 06522
- Vehicle registration: JH 01
- Literacy: 77.27%
- Lok Sabha constituency: Ranchi
- Vidhan Sabha constituency: Silli
- Website: ranchi.nic.in

Silli is a village in the Silli CD block in the Ranchi Sadar subdivision of the Ranchi district in the Indian state of Jharkhand.

== Geography ==
Cities, towns and locations in Ranchi district in South Chotanagpur Division
M: municipality, CT: census town, R: rural/ urban centre, N: neighbourhood, T: tourist centre, D: dam, H: historical/ religious centre
Owing to space constraints in the small map, the actual locations in a larger map may vary slightly

=== Location ===
Silli is located at 23.3503°N 85.8513°E.

The Subarnarekha River forms the boundary with Purulia district in West Bengal before flowing through Seraikela Kharsawan district.

=== Area overview ===
The map alongside shows a part of the Ranchi plateau, most of it at an average elevation of 2,140 feet above sea level. Only a small part in the north-eastern part of the district is the lower Ranchi plateau, spread over Silli, Rahe, Sonahatu and Tamar CD blocks, at an elevation of 500 to 1,000 feet above sea level. There is a 16 km long ridge south-west of Ranchi. There are isolated hills in the central plateau. The principal river of the district, the Subarnarekha, originates near Ratu, flows in an easterly direction and descends from the plateau, with a drop of about 300 feet at Hundru Falls. Subarnarekha and other important rivers are marked on the map. The forested area is shaded in the map. A major part of the North Karanpura Area and some fringe areas of the Piparwar Area of the Central Coalfields Limited, both located in the North Karanpura Coalfield, are in Ranchi district. There has been extensive industrial activity in Ranchi district, since independence. Ranchi district is the first in the state in terms of population. 8.83% of the total population of the state lives in this district - 56.9% is rural population and 43.1% is urban population.

Note: The map alongside presents some of the notable locations in the district. All places marked in the map are linked in the larger full screen map.

== Civic administration ==
=== Police station ===
There is a police station at Silli.

=== CD block HQ ===
The headquarters of Silli CD block are located at Silli.

== Demographics ==
According to the 2011 Census of India, Silli had a total population of 5,222, of which 2,684 (51%) were males and 2,538 (49%) were females. Population in the age range 0–6 years was 668. The total number of literate persons in Silli was 3,519 (77.27% of the population over 6 years).

== Transport ==
There are stations at Muri and Silli on the Netaji S.C.Bose Gomoh–Hatia line.

State Highway 1 (Ranchi-Silli-Muri Road), an important roadway in Ranchi district, passes through Silli.

== Education ==
Silli College, established in 1980, is affiliated with Ranchi University and offers courses in arts, science and commerce. It has 5,277 students.

SS High School is a Hindi-medium coeducational institution established in 1948. It has facilities for teaching from class IX to class XII. It has a library with 262 books.

Rudset Institute, a rural development and self-employment and training institute, was established at Silli in 2011. It organises skill development programmes.

== Sports ==
Silli Stadium with a capacity of 20,000 is used mainly for football. It has synthetic turf which was laid by the organisation who had laid the synthetic turf for the Salt Lake Stadium at Kolkata.
