= State Highway 2 (Jharkhand) =

State highway in Jharkhand, India

State Highway 2

Route information
- Length: 57 km (35 mi)

Major junctions
- From: Ramgarh Cantonment
- To: Ranchi

Location
- Country: India
- State: Jharkhand
- Districts: Ramgarh district, Ranchi district

Highway system
- Roads in India; Expressways; National; State; Asian; State Highways in Jharkhand

State Highway 2 (SH 2) is a state highway in Jharkhand, India.

== Route ==
SH 2 originates from its junction with NH 20 at Ramgarh Cantonment and passes through Barkakana, Bhurkunda, Bhadani Nagar, Balkundra, Patratu, Hesla, Pithuriya, Kanke and terminates at its junction with Ratu Aryapuri Road at Ranchi.

The total length of SH 2 is 57 km.
