= Balkundra =

- Census Town
- Location in Jharkhand, India#India3 Balkundra (India)
- Coordinates: 23.642°N 85.321°E
- Country: India
- State: Jharkhand
- District: Ramgarh

Area
  - Total: 1.187 km^{2} (0.458 sq mi)

Population (2011)
  - Total: 3,915
  - Density: 3,298/km^{2} (8,542/sq mi)

Languages (*For language details see Patratu (community development block)#Language and religion)
  - Official: Hindi, Urdu
- Time zone: UTC+5:30 (IST)
- PIN: 829118
- Telephone/ STD code: 0651
- Vehicle registration: JH
- Lok Sabha constituency: Hazaribagh
- Vidhan Sabha constituency: Ramgarh
- Website: ramgarh.nic.in

Balkundra is a census town in the Patratu CD block in the Ramgarh subdivision of the Ramgarh district in the state of Jharkhand, India.

== Geography ==
Cities, towns and locations in Ramgarh district in North Chotanagpur Division
M: municipality, CT: census town, R: rural/ urban centre, T: tourist centre, P: power plant
Abbreviation used- TPP: thermal power project
Owing to space constraints in the small map, the actual locations in a larger map may vary slightly

=== Location ===
Balkundra is located at 23.642°N 85.321°E.

=== Area overview ===
Ramgarh has a significant coal-mining sector. The district encompasses five operational areas of Central Coalfields across the South Karanpura Coalfield, Ramgarh Coalfield and West Bokaro Coalfield. Coal mines are located in four of the district's six community development (CD) blocks: Patratu, Ramgarh, Mandu, and Chitarpur. Consequently, these four blocks feature a higher concentration of census towns, whereas Gola and Dulmi blocks remain entirely rural. Physical geography-wise, Ramgarh district is situated in the central portion of the Chota Nagpur Plateau, with the Damodar valley covering much of its area, bordered by forested highlands to the north and south.

Note: The map alongside presents some of the notable locations in the district. All places marked in the map are linked in the larger full screen map.

== Civic administration ==
=== Police station ===
Basal police station serves Patratu CD block.

== Demographics ==
According to the 2011 Census of India, Balkundra had a total population of 3,915, of which 2,136 (55%) were males and 1,779 (45%) were females. Population in the age range 0–6 years was 484. The total number of literate persons in Balkundra was 2,533 (73.83% of the population over 6 years).

As of 2001 India census, Balkundra had a population of 5,369. Males constitute 54% of the population and females 46%. Balkundra has an average literacy rate of 68%, higher than the national average of 59.5%; with 61% of the males and 39% of females literate. 12% of the population is under 6 years of age.

== Infrastructure ==
According to the District Census Handbook 2011, Ramgarh, Balkundra covered an area of 1.187 km^{2}. Among the civic amenities, it had 8 km roads with both open and closed drains, the protected water supply involved uncovered well, hand pump. It had 684 domestic electric connections, 15 road lighting points. Among the medical facilities, it had 3 hospitals, 2 dispensaries, 2 health centres, 8 family welfare centres, 4 maternity and child welfare centres, 8 maternity homes, 5 nursing homes. Among the educational facilities it had 5 primary schools, 1 middle school, 2 secondary schools, 1 senior secondary school, the nearest general degree college at Bhurkunda 3 km away. It had 5 non-formal educational centres (Sarva Siksha Abhiyan). Among the social, recreational and cultural facilities it had 1 stadium. One important commodity it produced was steel. It had the branch offices of 1 nationalised bank, 1 agricultural credit society.

== Economy ==
Jindal Steel and Power has set up a 0.6 million tonnes per year wire rod mill and a 1 million tonnes per year bar mill in Patratu.

== Transport ==
Balkundra is on State Highway 2.
