= Sisai =

- Village
- Interactive map of Sisai
- Country: India
- State: Bihar

Area
  - Total: 4 km^{2} (1.5 sq mi)

Languages
  - Official: Bhojpuri, Hindi
- Time zone: UTC+5:30 (IST)
- Postal code: 841506
- ISO 3166 code: IN-BR

Sisai is one of the biggest villages in the Indian state of Bihar. It comes under Siwan District, located about 42 km by road and 52 km by train route north (U.P. border, absolute corner of Chhapra, Gopalganj and Siwan Districts) of Chhapra. It is a typical village of Bihar. It is the biggest village in Siwan. It has 51 tola. It comes under Goriyakothi Police Station and Sisai Panchayat. There is a famous middle school which was built in 1916. It is bounded by Chhitaouli from North, Bishunpur from South, Angya from East and Pahlejpur from West.

In the 2011 census, there were 1,877 families with population of 11,892 of which 5,633 were females while 6,259 were males. The population of children age 0-6 was 2202 which was 18.52% of total population. The average sex ratio of Sisai village was 1,111 which is higher than Bihar state average of 918. Child sex ratio for the Sisai in the census was 954, higher than the Bihar average of 935.

Sisai village has higher literacy rate compared to other villages and the average rate of Bihar. In 2011, the literacy rate of Sisai village was 66.08% compared to 61.80% of Bihar. In Sisai, male literacy stands at 78.54% while female literacy rate is 55.25%.

As per the constitution of India and Panchyati Raaj Act, Sisai village is administrated by Sarpanch (Head of Village) who is elected representative of village.

Caste Factor Schedule Caste (SC) constitutes 7.72% while Schedule Tribe (ST) were 0.01% of total population in Sisai village.

Sisai Data

Particulars Total Male Female Total No. of Houses 1,877 - - Population 11,892 6,259 5,633 Child (0–6) 2,202 1,127 1,075 Schedule Caste 918 444 474 Schedule Tribe 1 0 1 Literacy 66.08% 78.54% 55.25% Total Workers 3,602 2,306 1,296 Main Worker 1,616 0 0 Marginal Worker 1,986 1,011 975
