= Kandra =

Kandra कान्ड्रा
- Census Town
- Location in Jharkhand, India Kandra (India)
- Coordinates: 22.85°N 86.05°E
- Country: India
- State: Jharkhand
- District: Saraikela Kharsawan district

Government
  - Type: Federal democracy

Area
  - Total: 2.69 km^{2} (1.04 sq mi)
- Elevation: 226 m (741 ft)

Population (2011)
  - Total: 8,137
  - Density: 3,020/km^{2} (7,830/sq mi)

Languages*
  - Official: Hindi, Urdu
- Time zone: UTC+5:30 (IST)
- PIN: 832402
- Vehicle registration: JH 22
- Literacy: 76.45%
- Lok Sabha constituency: Singhbhum
- Vidhan Sabha constituency: Seraikella
- Website: seraikela.nic.in

Kandra is a census town in the (Adityapur) CD block in the Seraikela Sadar subdivision of the Saraikela Kharsawan district in the Indian state of Jharkhand.

== Geography ==
Cities, towns and locations in Seraikela Kharsawan district in Kolhan Division
M: municipality, R: rural/ urban centre, CT: census town, T: tourist centre
Owing to space constraints in the small map, the actual locations in a larger map may vary slightly

=== Location ===
Kandra is located at 22.85°N 86.05°E. It has an average elevation of 226 metres (741 feet).

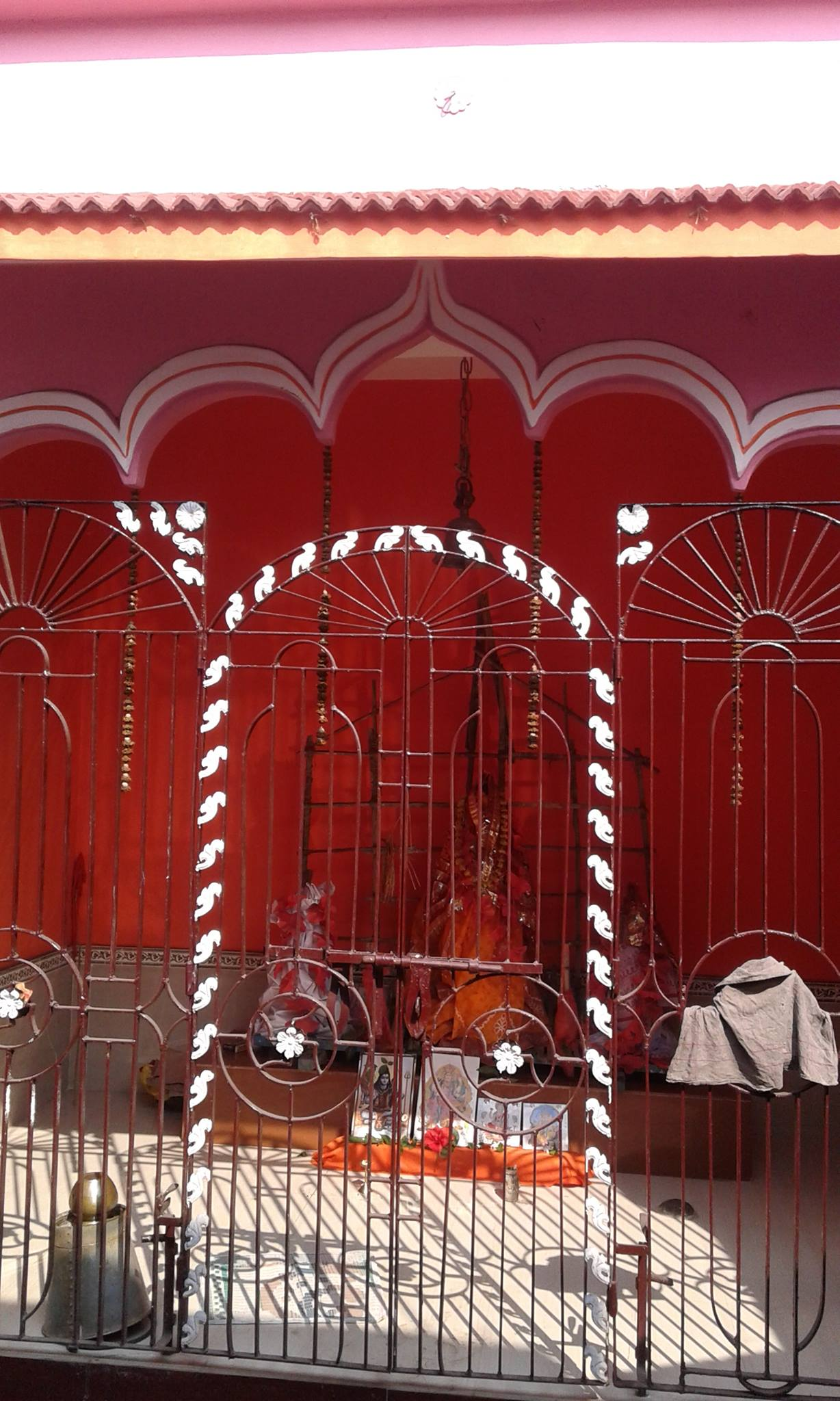
Manasa Mandir

=== Area overview ===
The area shown in the map has been described as “part of the southern fringe of the Chotanagpur plateau and is a hilly upland tract”. 75.7% of the population lives in the rural areas and 24.3% lives in the urban areas.

Note: The map alongside presents some of the notable locations in the district. All places marked in the map are linked in the larger full screen map.

== Civic administration ==
There is a police station at Kandra.

== Demographics ==
According to the 2011 Census of India, Kandra had a total population of 8,137, of which 4,239 (53%) were males and 3,918 (48%) were females. Population in the age range 0–6 years was 1,215. The total number of literate persons in Kandra was 5,307 (76.45% of the population over 6 years).

(*For language details see Adityapur block#Language and religion)

As of 2001 India census, Kandra had a population of 6,815. Males constitute 53% of the population and females 47%. Kandra has an average literacy rate of 61%, higher than the national average of 59.5%: male literacy is 72%, and female literacy is 49%. In Kandra, 13% of the population is under 6 years of age.

== Infrastructure ==
According to the District Census Handbook 2011, Seraikela Kharsawan, Khandra covered an area of 2.69 km^{2} (1.04 sq mi). It has an annual rainfall of 1,132.9 mm (44.60 in). Among the civic amenities, it had 15 km (9.3 mi) of roads with open drains. The protected water supply involved hand pump, uncovered well. It had 1,551 domestic electric connections, 10 road lighting points. Among the medical facilities, it had 1 hospital, 1 dispensary, 1 health centre, 9 family welfare centres, 9 maternity and child welfare centres, 22 maternity homes, 2 nursing homes, 1 veterinary hospital, 2 medicine shops. Among the educational facilities it had 4 primary schools, 4 middle schools, 3 secondary schools, 1 senior secondary school, the nearest general degree college at Jamshedpur, 20 km (12 mi) away. It had 4 non-formal education centres (Sarva Shiksha Abhiyan). Among social, cultural and recreational facilities, it had 1 auditorium/ community hall. Three important commodities it produced were sponge iron, bamboo items, metal. It had the branch offices of 1 nationalised bank, 1 private commercial bank, 1 co-operative bank, 5 agricultural credit societies, 2 non-agricultural credit societies.

== Economy ==
- Seraikella Glass Works (P) Ltd. (Closed in 1990s)
- Adhunik Group.
- Nilachal Iron and Power Ltd.
- Amalgam Steel & Power LTd

== Transport ==
=== Roadways ===
Kandra is well connected with all major cities of Jharkhand and other parts of India through national and state highways. The major highways are:

- 6 lane Expressway (Adityapur-Kandra Road) connects Jamshedpur to Kandra
- National Highway 18 passes near Kandra and connects Jamshedpur to Govindpur via Dhanbad, Purulia, Chandil,
- State Highway 5 passes through Kandra and connects to Chaibasa and Seraikela.

=== Railways ===
Kandra Railway Station is a railway junction on the Chakradharpur division, of the South Eastern Railway. Kandra station has about 4 platforms and 2 thorough tracks for non stopping trains. Few of the long distance trains heading to Tatanagar Railway Station stop at platform 3 and 2.

=== Airport ===
Tata Steel had proposed to set up a 600-acre (2.4 km^{2}) Greenfield airport on the outskirts of Jamshedpur in Kandra, Adityapur-Seraikela region. In June 2011 Tata Steel and TRIL entered formally into a joint venture for building the airport. The new airport will be of international standard with a 10,000 ft runway, it will have the capacity to allow commercial airliners such as the Airbus A320 to land and take off which was not possible from the present airport. As of December 2012, Land acquisition process has started for the Airport. Out of 528 acres (214 ha) of required land 90% is owned by Govt. whereas rest is private land. The company is at present facing opposition in the acquisition process from the local villagers.

== Education ==
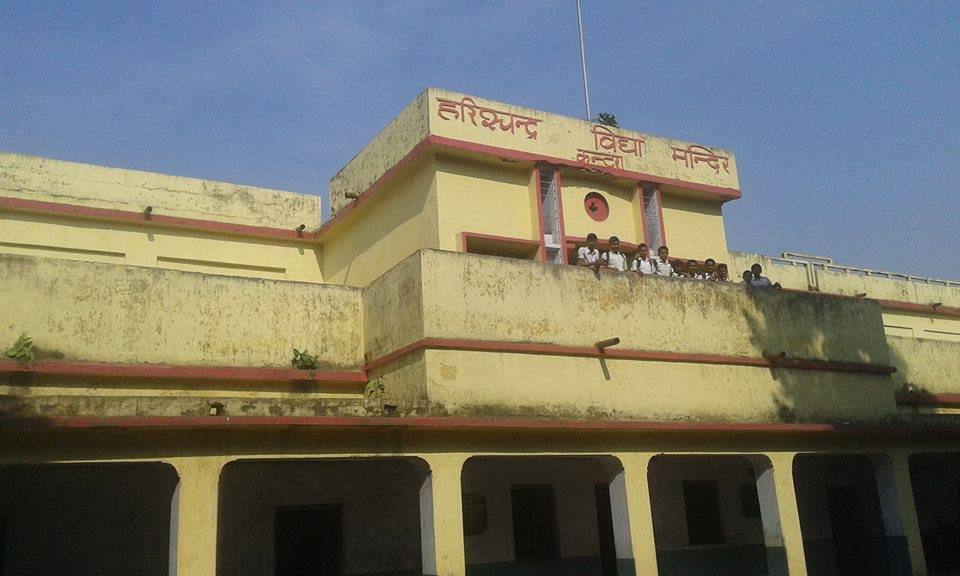
Harish Chandra Vidhya Mandir, Kandra Gurukul world public school, Kandra Utkramit uchha vidyalaya Narendra nagar, kandra (बस्ती स्कूल

Harish Chandra Vidhya Mandir, Kandra

== Culture ==
Kandra observes Manasa Puja, dedicated to the Goddess of snakes, and Durga Puja, which is followed by Dashehra Ravan Dhahan, a festival held by local residents. Other observed events include the Jagganath Rath Yatra, Chhath Parva, Tusu Mela, Hari Sankirtan, and Bhagta Parva.
