= Patratu Thermal Power Station =

Indian Thermal Power Station

Coordinates: 23.641°N 85.294°E

Patratu Thermal Power Station is a coal-based thermal power plant located near Patratu town in Ramgarh district in the Indian state of Jharkhand. The power plant is operated by the Jharkhand State Electricity Board.

== Capacity ==
It has an installed capacity of 840 MW. The generating units of the power plant are very old and are operating at around 10% PLF, generating about 110 MW.

As of April 2015, there is plan to float a joint venture company with National Thermal Power Corporation holding 74% and Jharkhand government holding 26%. The new company will set up a 4000 MW (800 MW × 5) Patratu Super Thermal Power Project which will utilize 1500 acres out of 6300 acres available with the existing power plant.

Stage	Unit number	Capacity (MW)	EPC contractor	Date of commissioning	Status
1	1	800	BHEL		Under Construction
1	2	800	BHEL		Under Construction
1	3	800	BHEL		Under Construction
Total		2400			
