= Patratu =

- Census Town
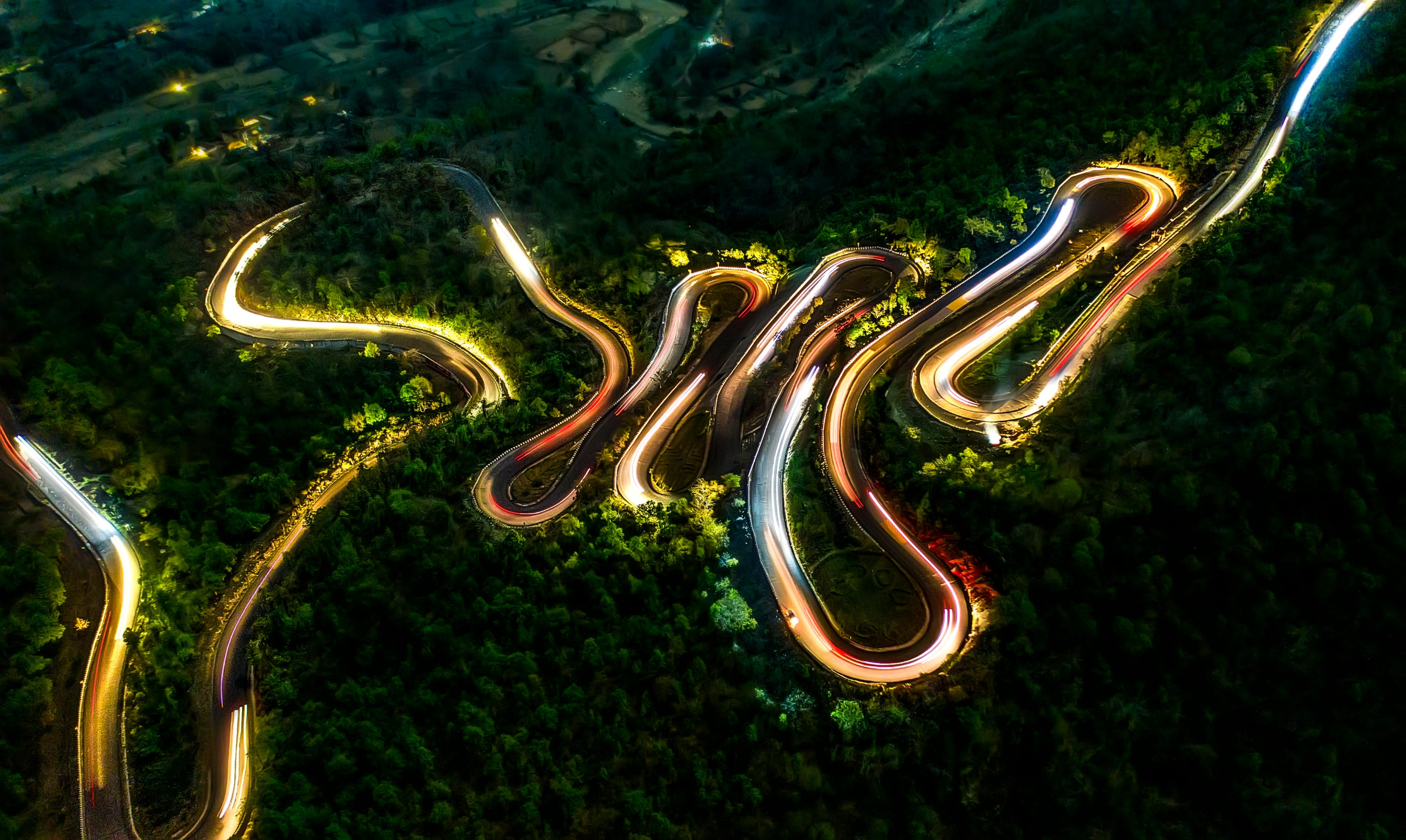
- Patratu Valley

- Location in Jharkhand, India Patratu (India)
- Coordinates: 23.67°N 85.28°E
- Country: India
- State: Jharkhand
- District: Ramgarh

Area
  - Total: 1.392 km^{2} (0.537 sq mi)
- Elevation: 405 m (1,329 ft)

Population (2011)
  - Total: 32,899
  - Density: 23,630/km^{2} (61,210/sq mi)

Languages
  - Official: Hindi, Urdu
- Time zone: UTC+5:30 (IST)
- PIN: 829118
- Telephone/ STD code: 0651
- Vehicle registration: JH
- Lok Sabha constituency: Hazaribagh
- Vidhan Sabha constituency: Ramgarh
- Website: ramgarh.nic.in

Patratu is a census town in the Patratu (community development block) in the Ramgarh subdivision of the Ramgarh district in the Indian state of Jharkhand.

== Geography ==
Cities, towns and locations in Ramgarh district in North Chotanagpur Division
M: municipality, CT: census town, R: rural/ urban centre, T: tourist centre, P: power plant
Abbreviation used- TPP: thermal power project
Owing to space constraints in the small map, the actual locations in a larger map may vary slightly

=== Location ===
Patratu is located at 23.67°N 85.28°E. It has an average elevation of 405 metres (1328 feet). Patratu Dam was constructed under the planning of the greatest Indian engineer and father of Indian engineering, Sir Mokshagundam Visvesvaraya. This dam is only 40 km away from Ranchi, the capital of Jharkhand, from where it can be reached by road in less than an hour. It is directly connected to Ranchi, Patna, Jaipur, Jamshedpur, Varanasi, Jammu, Jabalpur, Allahabad, Delhi and Kolkata by train.

=== Area overview ===
Ramgarh has a coal-mining sector. The map alongside provides links to five operational areas of Central Coalfields spread across South Karanpura Coalfield, Ramgarh Coalfield and West Bokaro Coalfield. Four of the six CD blocks in the district have coal mines – Patratu, Ramgarh, Mandu and Chitarpur. The high concentration of census towns in these blocks are noticeable on the map. Only two blocks, Gola and Dulmi, are totally rural areas. Ramgarh district lies in the central part of the Chota Nagpur Plateau. The Damodar valley covers most of the district. The forested areas in highlands to the north and the south of the valley can be seen in the map (mark the shaded areas). "Chotanagpur has a charm of its own... The entire area forms one of the most charming series of views imaginable. The far-off hills in the background in exquisite tints of blue or purple as the light falls, the nearer hills picturesquely shaped and luxuriant in every shade of green with their bold escarpments in black or grey, and the brown plains below furnishing their quota of colours."

Note: The map alongside presents some of the notable locations in the district. All places marked in the map are linked in the larger full screen map.

== Civic administration ==
=== Police station ===
Patratu police station serves Patratu CD block.

=== CD block HQ ===
The headquarters of Patratu CD block is located at Patratu town.

== Demographics ==
According to the 2011 Census of India, Patratu had a total population of 32,899, of which 17,305 (53%) were males and 15,594 (47%) were females. Population in the age range 0-6 years was 3,999 (12%). The total number of literate persons in Patratu was 24,382 (84.37% of the population over 6 years).

As of the 2001 Census of India, Patratu had a population of 32,132, of which 17,311 (54%) were male and 14,821 (46%) were female. Population in the age range 0-6 was 4,198 (13%). In 2001, Patratu had an average literacy rate of 70%, higher than the national average of 59.5%: male literacy was 79%, and female literacy was 61%.

== Infrastructure ==
According to the District Census Handbook 2011, Ramgarh, Patratu covered an area of 1.392 km^{2}. Among the civic amenities, it had 25 km roads with both open and closed drains, the protected water supply involved tap water from treated sources, uncovered wells, overhead tanks. It had 5,822 domestic electric connections, 120 road lighting points. Among the medical facilities, it had 4 hospitals, 1 dispensary, 1 health centre, 1 family welfare centre, 8 maternity and child welfare centres, 6 maternity homes, 16 nursing homes, 10 medicine shops. Among the educational facilities it had 14 primary schools, 6 middle schools, 5 secondary schools, 2 senior secondary schools, 1 general degree college. It had 1 non-formal educational centre (Sarva Siksha Abhiyan). Among the social, recreational and cultural facilities it had 1 stadium, 1 cinema theatre, 3 auditorium/ community halls, 3 public libraries, 1 reading room. An important commodity It produced was electricity. It had the branch offices of 3 nationalised banks, 1 agricultural credit society.

== Education ==
Schools in Patratu include:

- S.S High School was established on 1 January 1963. It is located beside road leading to Patratu dam and subsequently Ranchi. It is a 10+2 school with a large area and a big playground.
- Kendriya Vidyalaya Patratu
- D.A.V. Public School Patratu
- O P Jindal School Patratu
- Patratu School of Economics
- Saraswati Shishu Vidya Mandir, Patratu
- Jawahar Navodaya Vidyalaya, Patratu
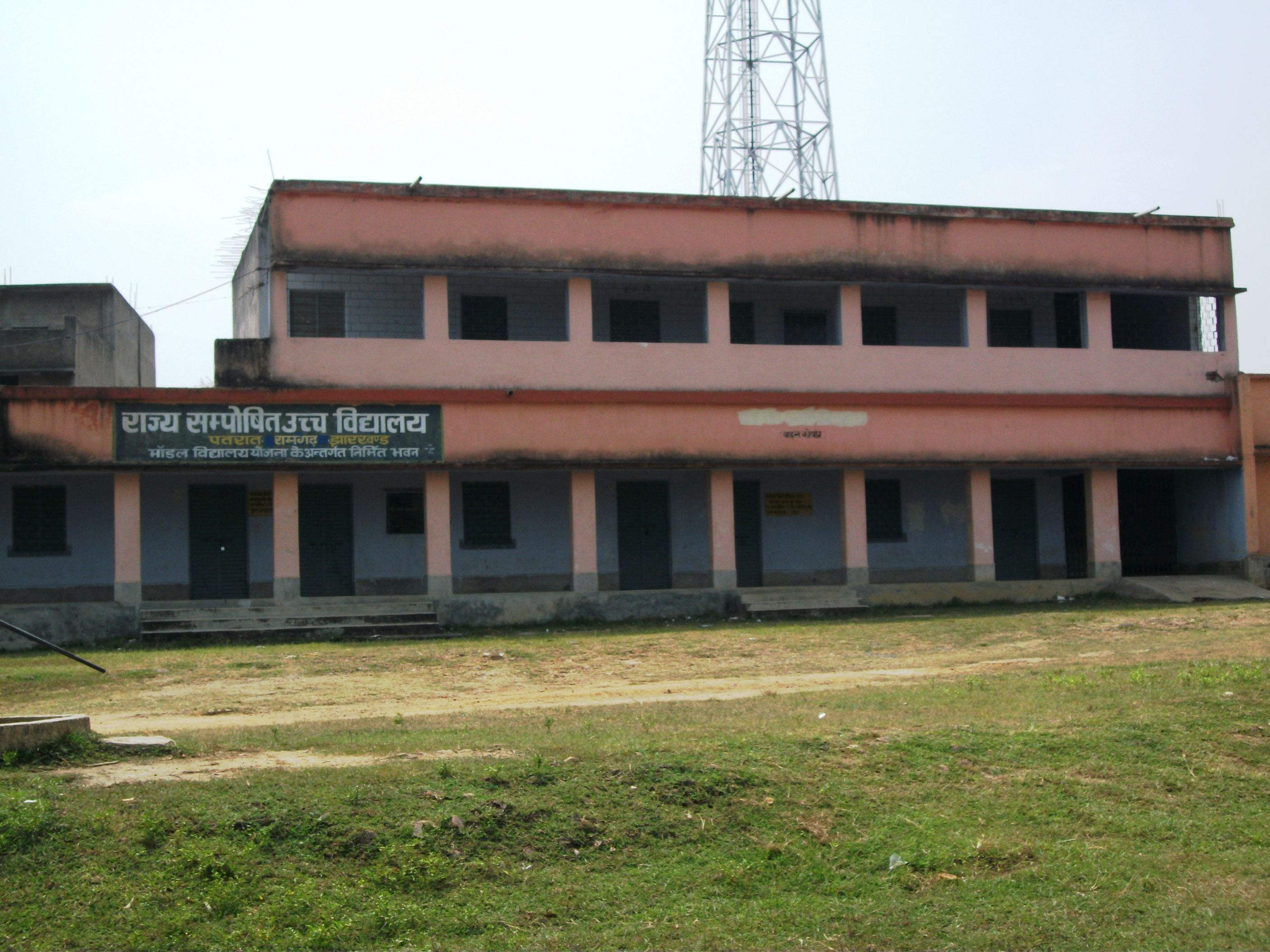
S.S. High School 2

=== Colleges ===
Patratu Thermal Power Station (PTPS) College, affiliated with Vinoba Bhave University was established at Patratu in 1972.

== Transportation ==
=== Airways ===
Birsa Munda Airport is the nearest airport, with direct flights available to Delhi, Kolkata, Mumbai, Hyderabad, Jharsuguda, Indore, Bhubaneswar, Bangalore and Patna.

=== Railways ===
Patratu Railway Station is the only railway station. It has three platforms with direct trains available for Kolkata in Up direction, and in the down direction New Delhi, Patna and many states of India like Punjab and Haryana.

=== Roadways ===
Patratu is connected by State Highway 2 of Jharkhand, to its district headquarters at Ramgarh and state capital at Ranchi. There is also a bus station where buses are available for many cities of Jharkhand and West Bengal.

== Latest happenings ==
Jharkhand Chief Minister Raghubar Das on 13 July 2015 inaugurated the Patratu unit of Burnpur Cement.

== Patratu Dam ==
The dam was made to store water of the Nalkari River for supply to the Ramgarh cantonment area as well as being the main reservoir for the Patratu Thermal Power Station (PTPS). There have been plans to turn it into a tourist attraction

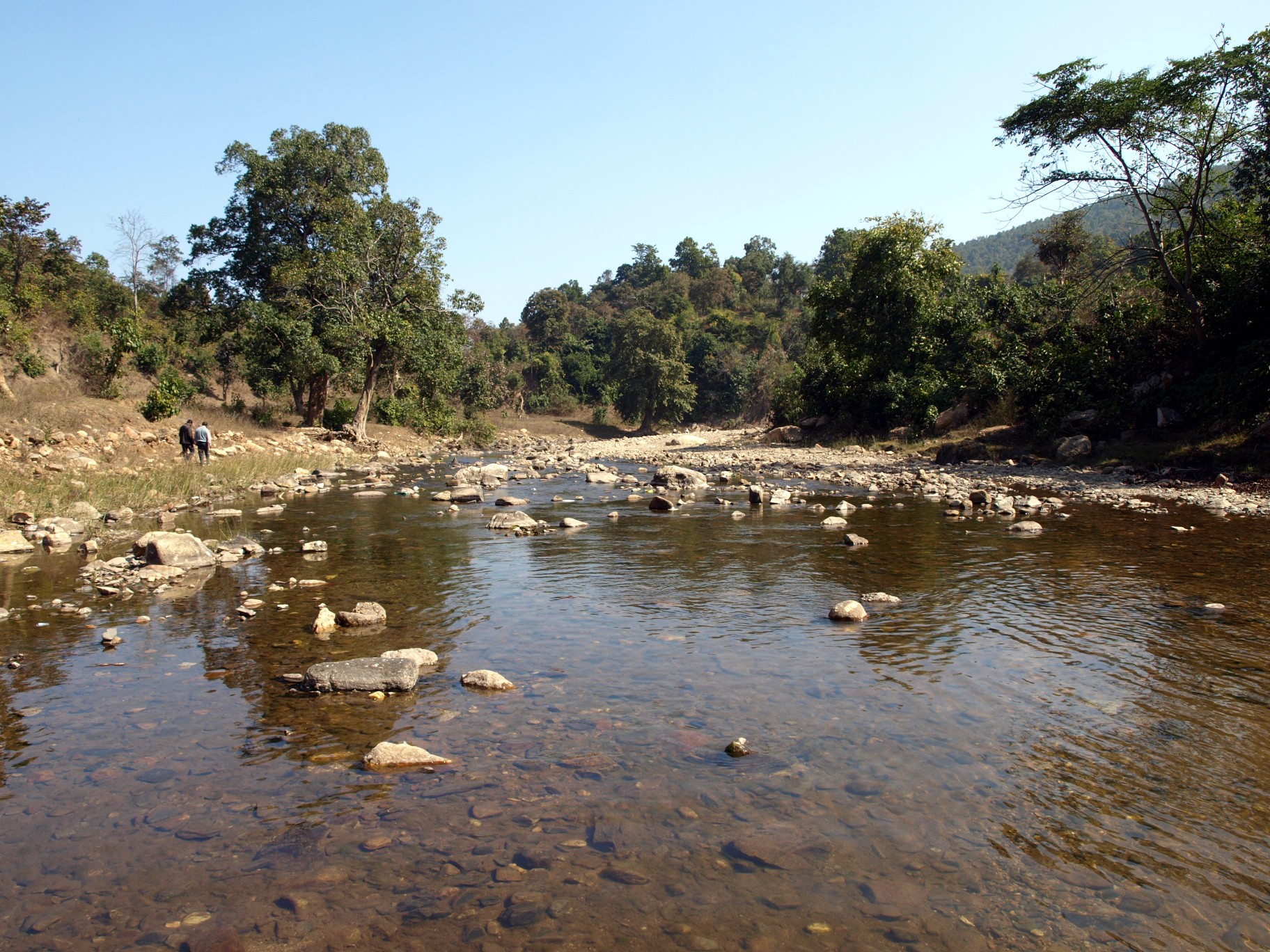
View of Nalkari River

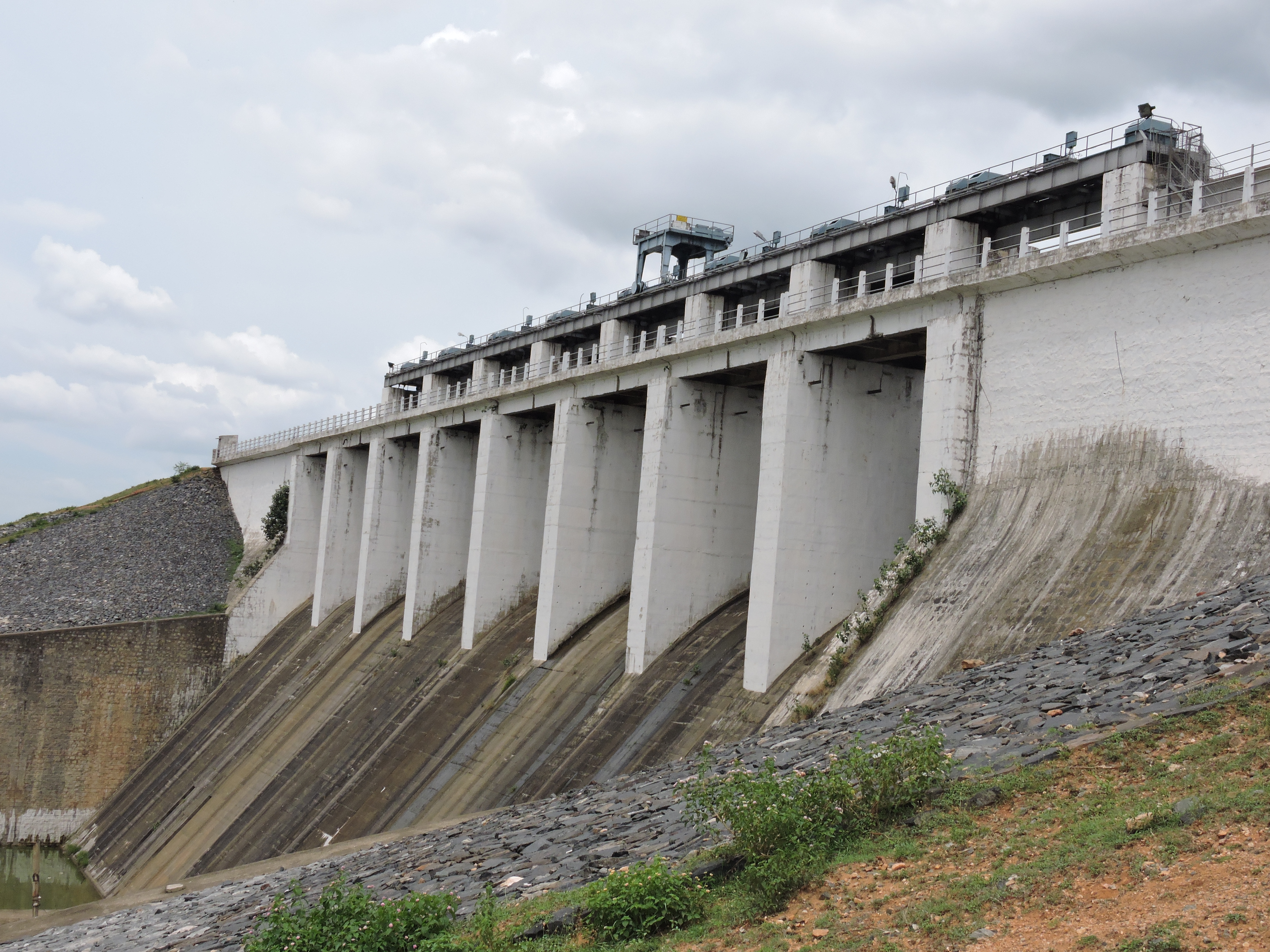
Dam

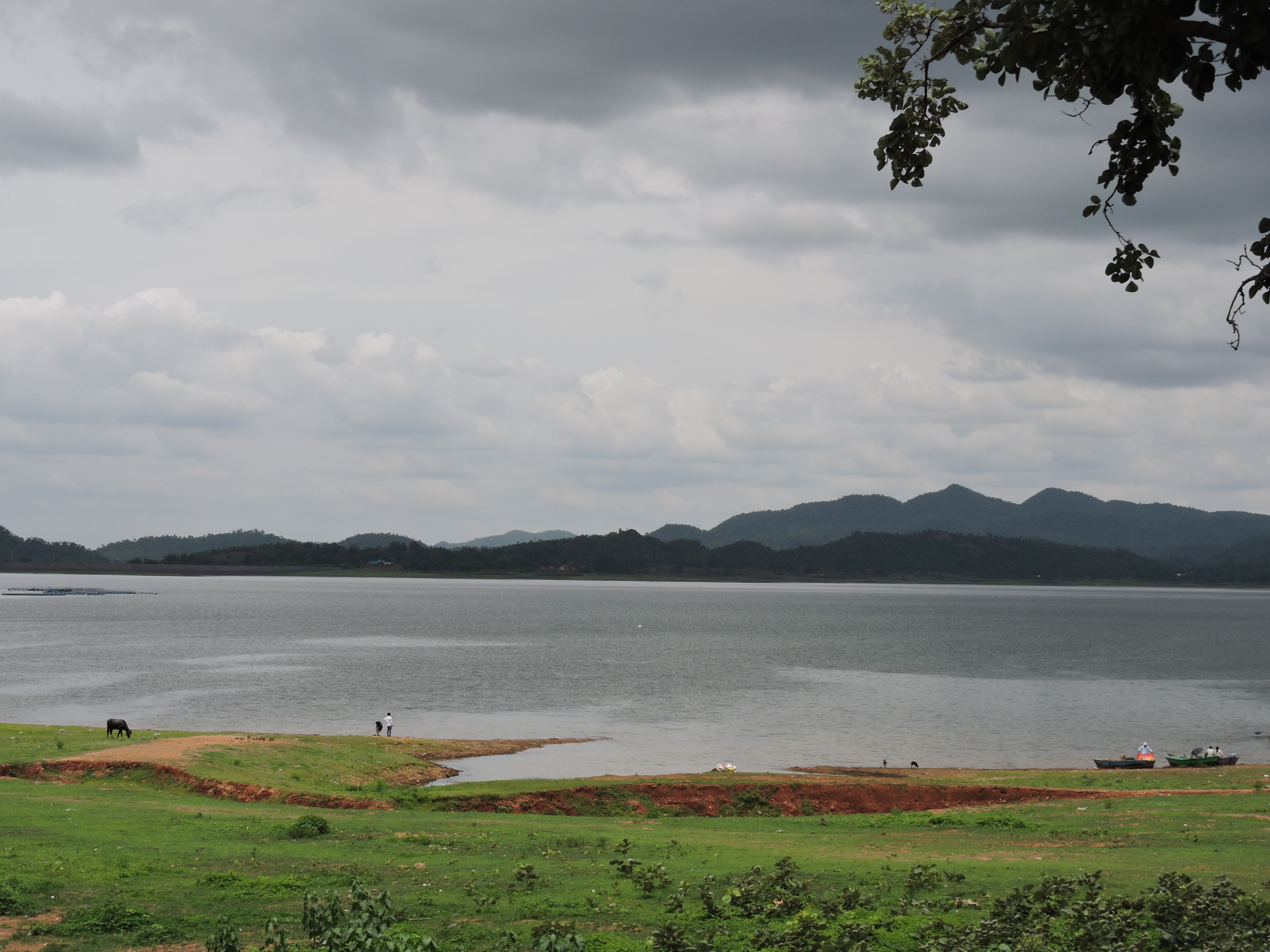
On a cloudy day

== Patratu valley ==
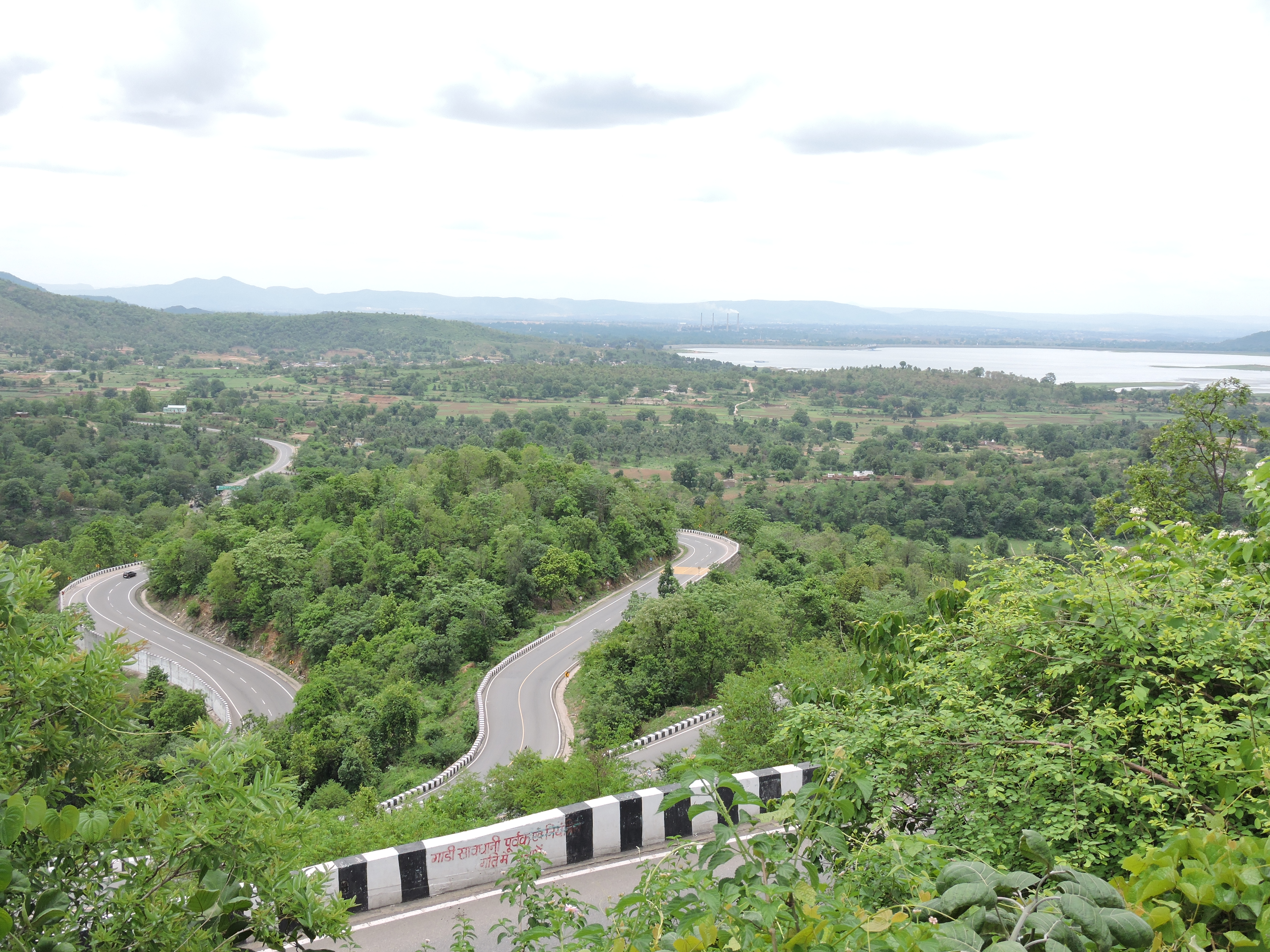
View of Patratu valley

During recent changes, the area's coal pulling bicycles have gotten the support of local motor bikers on a profit sharing basis.

== Patratu Thermal Power Station ==
The attraction of this city is its natural habitat and scenic beauty. The city is developed as a residential area for employees of the Patratu Thermal Power Station. This thermal power station was made by Russian collaboration in 1962. It has two chimneys made by a Russian firm, which are called the Russian side. The other two chimneys were made by an Indian firm, so it is called the Indian side. The plant has a power generation capacity of 840 MW. Construction of 4000 MW power plant is going on in Patratu, the first unit will start in 2024.
