= Barkakana =

Barkakana N.T.S Barkakana
- Census Town
- Location in Jharkhand, India Barkakana (India)
- Coordinates: 23.62°N 85.48°E
- Country: India
- State: Jharkhand
- District: Ramgarh
- Named for: Railway junction

Area
  - Total: 1.117 km^{2} (0.431 sq mi)
- Elevation: 377 m (1,237 ft)

Population (2011)
  - Total: 18,475
  - Density: 16,540/km^{2} (42,840/sq mi)

Languages
  - Official (*For language details see Patratu (community development block)#Language and religion): Hindi, Urdu
- Time zone: UTC+5:30 (IST)
- PIN: 829118
- Telephone/ STD code: 0651
- Vehicle registration: JH
- Lok Sabha constituency: Hazaribagh
- Vidhan Sabha constituency: Ramgarh
- Website: ramgarh.nic.in

Barkakana is a census town in the Patratu CD block in the Ramgarh subdivision of the Ramgarh district in the state of Jharkhand, India.

== Geography ==
Cities, towns and locations in Ramgarh district in North Chotanagpur Division
M: municipality, CT: census town, R: rural/ urban centre, T: tourist centre, P: power plant
Abbreviation used- TPP: thermal power project
Owing to space constraints in the small map, the actual locations in a larger map may vary slightly

=== Location ===
Barkakana is located at 23.62°N 85.48°E. It has an average elevation of 377 m (1,237 ft).

Barkakana is a small township situated on the outskirts of the district town of Ramgarh Cantonment in Jharkhand. It is located in the Damodar rift valley with the Hazaribagh plateau in the north and the Ranchi plateau in the south, both of which are part of Chhotanagpur plateau. The town is surrounded by hills in south and has Ramgarh town in the east. The river Damodar flows on its north.

=== Area overview ===
Ramgarh has a coal-mining sector. The map alongside provides links to five operational areas of Central Coalfields spread across South Karanpura Coalfield, Ramgarh Coalfield and West Bokaro Coalfield. Four of the six CD blocks in the district have coal mines – Patratu, Ramgarh, Mandu and Chitarpur. The high concentration of census towns in these blocks are noticeable on the map. Only two blocks, Gola and Dulmi, are totally rural areas. Ramgarh district lies in the central part of the Chota Nagpur Plateau. The Damodar valley covers most of the district. The forested areas in highlands to the north and the south of the valley can be seen in the map (mark the shaded areas).

Note: The map alongside presents some of the notable locations in the district. All places marked in the map are linked in the larger full screen map.

== Demographics ==
According to the 2011 Census of India, Barkakana had a total population of 18,475, of which 9,640 (52%) were males and 8,835 (48%) were females. Population in the age range 0–6 years was 2,253. The total number of literate persons in Barkakana was 13,442 (82.86% of the population over 6 years).

Ramgarh Urban Agglomeration had a population of 132,441 in the 2011 Census, of which males were 70,871 and females 61,562. Ramgarh Urban Agglomeration is composed of Ramgarh Cantonment (Cantonment Board), Sirka (Census Town), Marar (CT) and Barkakana (CT).

In the 2011 census the total number of literates in Ramgarh UA was 95,734 (82.97 per cent of total population) out of which 55,352 (89.57 percent of males) were males and 40,362 (75.35 percent of females) were females.

As of 2001 India census, Barkakana had a population of 16,872. Males constitute 54% of the population and females 46%. Barkakana has an average literacy rate of 68%. 13% of the population is under 6 years of age.

== Civic administration ==
There is a Police Outpost at Barkakana.

== Infrastructure ==
According to the District Census Handbook 2011, Ramgarh, Barkakana covered an area of 1.117 km^{2}. Among the civic amenities, it had 18 km roads with both open and closed drains, the protected water supply involved tap water from treated sources, hand pump, overhead tank. It had 3,303 domestic electric connections, 89 road lighting points. Among the medical facilities, it had 1 hospital, 3 dispensaries, 3 health centres, 1 family welfare centre, 8 maternity and child welfare centres, 6 maternity homes, 6 nursing homes, 1 medicine shop. Among the educational facilities it had 5 primary schools, 3 middle schools, 2 secondary schools, 1 senior secondary school, the nearest general degree college at Ramgarh Cantonment 7 km away. It had 1 non-formal educational centre (Sarva Siksha Abhiyan). Among the social, recreational and cultural facilities it had 1 stadium, 1 auditorium/ community hall. One important commodity it produced was furniture. It had the branch offices of 2 nationalised banks, 1 private commercial bank, 1 cooperative bank, 1 agricultural credit society, 1 non-agricultural credit society.

== Economy ==
Barkakana serves as a marketplace and transit point for the people of nearby towns like Ramgarh, Kuju, and Bhurkunda, and villages including Teliyatu, Masmohna, Chotkakana and Piri. An important railway junction of East Central Railway is here with stoppage of all trains including Ranchi Rajdhani express. Several small-scale and medium-scale industries have come up in and around Barkakana, due to its proximity to the Damodar River, with easy and cheap availability of land and presence of good transportation facilities. It has administrative, operational control, maintenance and construction centres of Indian Railways under its traffic, civil engineering electrical engineering, mechanical engineering and signalling cadres. A repair shop of CCL is also present in this region.

== Transport ==
Barkakana railway station is under Dhanbad division under East Central Railway zone of Indian Railways. The railway control room covering Barkakana section of Dhanbad division, covering 34 stations, is located here. It is also well-connected to the district town Ramgarh Cantonment via a four-lane road, which in turn is well-connected via a grid of national highways. Barkakana also houses a central repair shop of Central Coalfields Limited. A residential area for its employees is known as N.T.S. Barkakana.

Barkakana is on State Highway 2.

== Education ==
Barkakana has educational institutions only until the senior-secondary level. Prominent schools are DAV Public School, NTS Barkakana, and Kendriya Vidyalaya. Sri Narayan High School, R.A.M.school Barkakana, SVD Public School, and Saraswati Vidyamandir are others.

== Healthcare ==
Central Coalfields Limited has the CWS Hospital at Barkakana (independent unit) with 11 beds and 3 general duty medical officers. Among the facilities it has a laboratory. It has 1 ambulance.
