= Harivansh Tana Bhagat Indoor Stadium =

Multipurpose stadium in Hotwar, Ranchi, Jharkhand, India

Haribansh Tana Bhagat Indoor Stadium
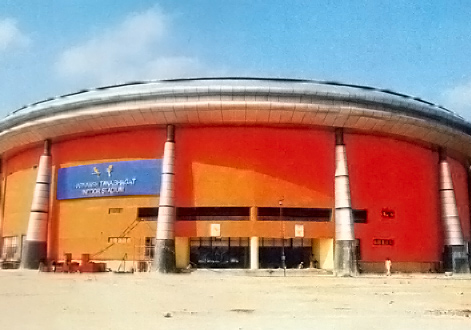
- Location: Hotwar, Ranchi, Jharkhand
- Owner: Sports Authority of Jharkhand
- Capacity: 4,000

Construction
- Built: 2011

Tenant
- Patna Pirates (2017)

Harivansh Tana Bhagat Indoor Stadium is a multipurpose stadium in Ranchi city of India. It is owned by the Jharkhand's State authority and is the home ground for Patna Pirates in the 2017 season of Pro Kabaddi League. The stadium was also the venue of the 2011 National Games of India.

It is part of the Mega Sports Complex together with the Birsa Munda Athletics Stadium.
