= Dhurwa Dam =

Dam in Jharkhand

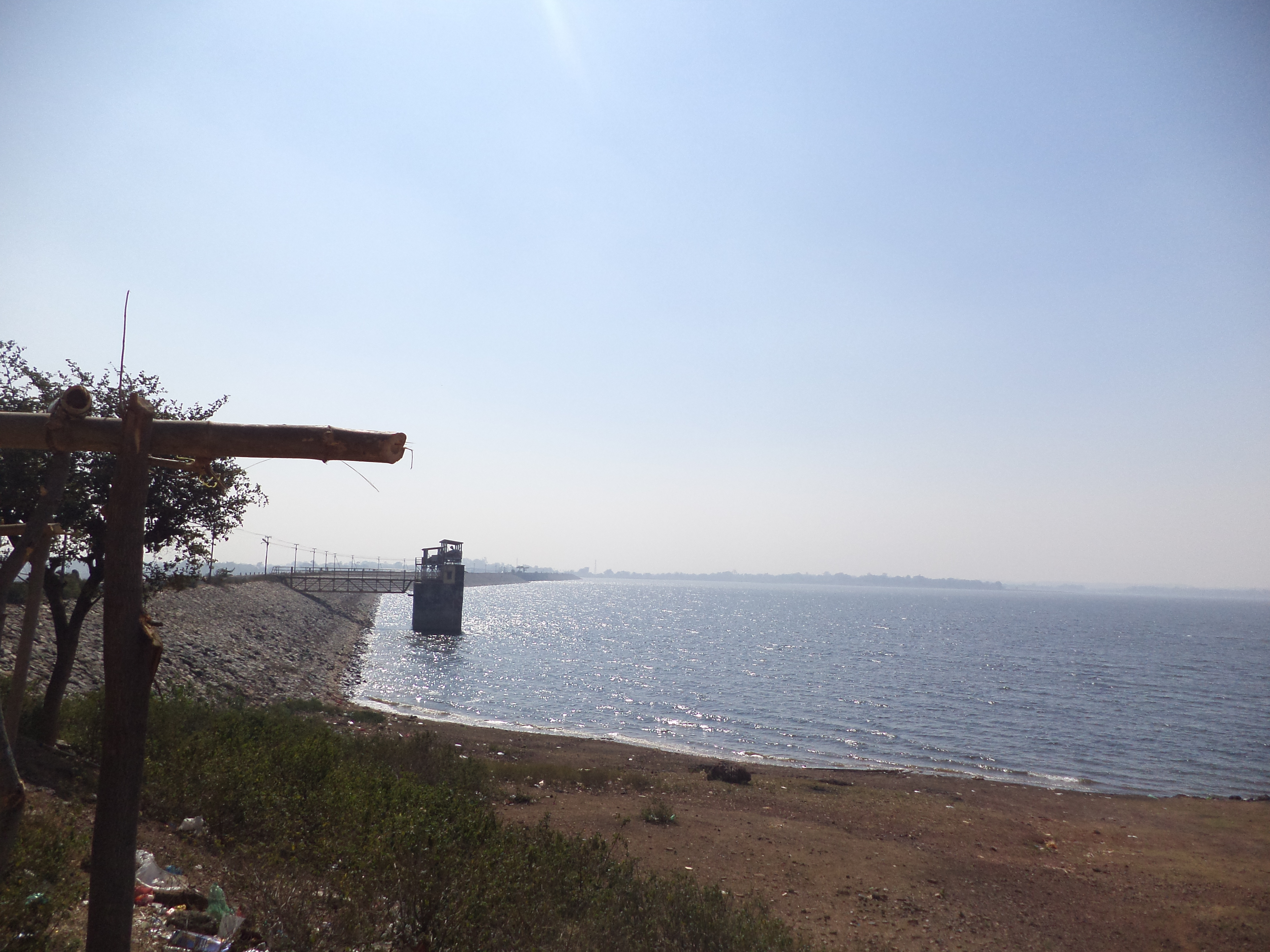
- Dhurwa Dam, Ranchi, Jharkhand

- Location of the Dhurwa Dam in India
- Official name: Dhurwa Dam
- Country: India
- Location: Dhurwa, Ranchi, Jharkhand
- Coordinates: 23°17′29.19″N 85°15′23.58″E
- Status: Operational
- Opening date: 1963; 63 years ago
- Owner: JUIDCO

Dam and spillways
- Type of dam: Earthfill
- Impounds: Subarnarekha River
- Height: 30 m (98 ft)
- Length: 4,525 m (14,846 ft)
- Spillways: 1
- Spillway type: Ogee

Reservoir
- Creates: Dhurwa Reservoir
- Total capacity: 34.1000000 m^{3} (1,204.23014 cu ft)
- Active capacity: 31.9 million cubic meters
- Surface area: 33.5 km^{2} (13 sq mi)

The Dhurwa Dam (Hindi: धुर्वा बाँध Dhurvā Bāndh), officially known as Hatia Dam, is a significant dam on the Subarnarekha River in Ranchi, Jharkhand.

== Description ==
Completed in 1963 with Russian assistance, it provides around 9.5 million gallons of drinking water daily to Ranchi and its surrounding areas, with 8.5 million gallons for the city and 1 million gallons for Heavy Engineering Corporation Ltd (HEC). The dam also supports the proposed Ranchi Smart City, aiming to supply an additional 12 million liters of water. However, it faces challenges, particularly during summer when water levels drop significantly.

Managed by the Jharkhand Urban Infrastructure Development Company (JUIDCO), the Dhurwa Dam has a gross reservoir capacity of about 34.1 million cubic meters(MCM), crucial for domestic use and irrigation. The dam not only plays a vital role in the local economy but also attracts tourists for its scenic beauty and recreational opportunities. While ongoing water scarcity raises concerns about meeting the growing urban population's demands, the Jharkhand government has proposed linking additional water sources to ensure a reliable supply for both current residents and future developments.

== See also ==
- List of dams and reservoirs in India
