= Mega Sports Complex, Ranchi =

Multi purpose sports complex in India

Coordinates: 23.380°N 85.388°E

The Mega Sports Complex is a multi purpose sports complex located in Ranchi, Jharkhand. It is owned by the Government of Jharkhand.

== History ==
The stadium hosted 2011 National Games of India.

== Features ==
List of sporting complexes
Name	Sport	capacity	
Birsa Munda Athletics Stadium	Track and field	35,000	Main stadium
Birsa Munda Athletics Stadium	Track and field		Practicing ground
Ganpat Rai Indoor Stadium	Indoor sports	4,000	
Tana Bhagat Indoor Stadium	Indoor sports	4,000	
Tanveer Khan Indoor Stadium	Indoor sports	4,000	
Sheikh Bhikhari Administrative Block	Indoor sports	22,000	
Tennis center	Tennis	2,000	
Veer Budhu Bhagat Aquatic Stadium	Swimming	3,194	
Kabaddi and Kho Kho Stadium	Kabaddi and Kho kho		
Tikait Umrao Shooting Range	Shooting		
Badminton Courts	Badminton		
Rugby Outdoor Stadium	Rugby sevens		
Sighu Kunhu Velodrome	Track cycling and Roller skating		
Archery Range	Archery		Outdoor
Ram Dayal Kala Bhavan			Auditorium
