= Lalpur, Ranchi =

- Suburb and Business District
- Country: India
- State or Union Territory: Jharkhand
- City/Metro/Town: Ranchi

Lalpur is a major suburb in Ranchi, Jharkhand, India. It is an upscale mixed used commercial - residential mixed used suburb neighbourhood in Ranchi. This is one of the major, main and important commercial suburbs of the city. The PIN code of Lalpur is 834001.

This place has a number of shopping malls and shopping complexes. Here is the famous Nucleus shopping mall. Numerous markets and marketplaces are located in this area. As a result, a lot of garbage is also generated and sometimes piles up on the roadside.

Lalpur is one of the major commercial areas of the city along with Hindpiri, Lower Bazar and Upper Bazar. There are many hotels in Lalpur, and this locality houses many commercial properties and residential properties. Here are two famous and popular cinemas, and a number of hospitals and clinics. The roads were crowded and traffic jams were common and the former chief minister Arjun Munda proposed to build a flyover and allotted Rs.29 crore and as of 2019 the work did not begin.

== Intersections ==
=== Lalpur Chowk ===
Lalpur Chowk, an important locality of Lalpur, Ranchi, Jharkhand state, is an intersection of Circular Road and Old Hazaribagh Road (Old HB Road). The word chowk is a Hindi word meaning intersection. The area has several shops and important commercial establishments. Circular Road ends at the subsequent chowk, namely, Dangratoli Chowk, where it meets Purulia Road. In the opposite direction, the Circular Road takes one to Kutchery area of Ranchi. From there, it forks to Ratu Road and Kanke Road. Old HB Road continues until it meets the new Hazaribagh Road. In the opposite direction it leads to Firayalal chowk, which is also one of the busiest intersections in Ranchi. Lalpur Chowk also leads to Peace Road.

There are major residential areas around Lalpur chowk: Burdwan Compound, BSNL colony, PN Bose Compound, etc. Burdwan Compound has a large population of Bengalis. Burdwan Compound is so named because it was the estate of the Bardhaman Raj, today a part of the West Bengal state in India.

== Commerce ==
Nucleus Shopping Mall in Lalpur is one of the largest and most popular shopping malls in the city of Ranchi. This mall was established in 2017.
