= Harmu Housing Colony, Ranchi =

Harmu Housing Colony
- Neighbourhood
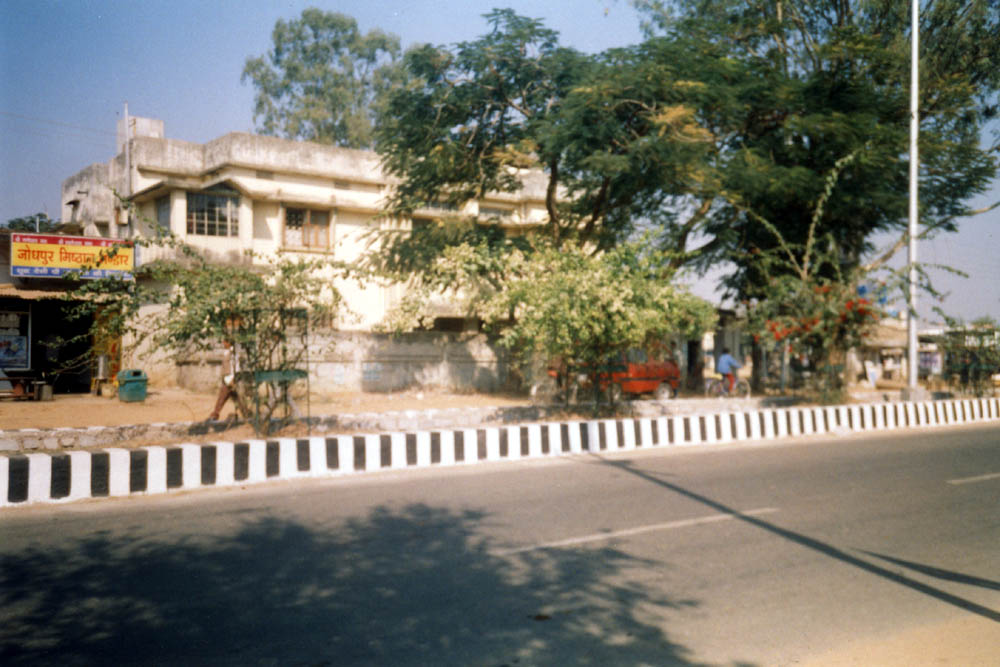
- Harmu Housing Colony
- Country: India
- State or Union Territory: Jharkhand
- City/Town/Metropolis/Megacity: Ranchi

Harmu Housing Colony is one of the largest residential areas of Ranchi, the capital of Jharkhand state, India. The Colony was established during the early 1960s, and has since rapidly expanded. As of 2016, it has, apart from residential houses and apartments, a number of trading and commercial establishments; government offices; schools and hospitals, and other civic facilities. The neighboring areas of Harmu housing Colony are Argora and Ashok Nagar in South, Kishore Gunj in North and New AG Cooperative colony in East. MS Dhoni, a former captain of the Indian men's cricket team also owns a house here. Many high rise apartments are being built in this area and property prices are very high.

== See also ==
- List of Neighbourhoods of Ranchi
