= Tagore Hill =

Hill in Jharkhand, India

Coordinates: 23.401°N 85.338°E

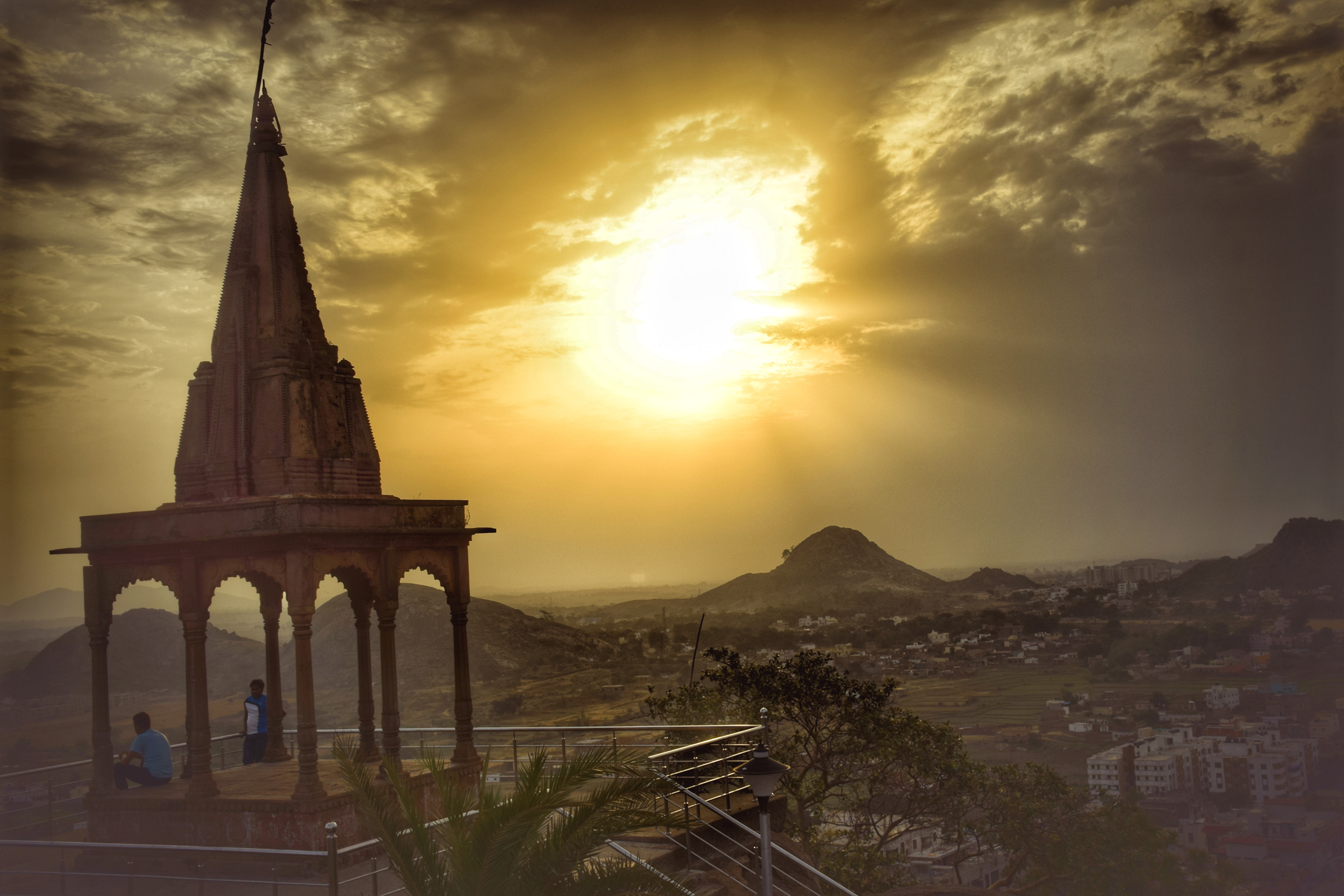
View from Tagore Hill

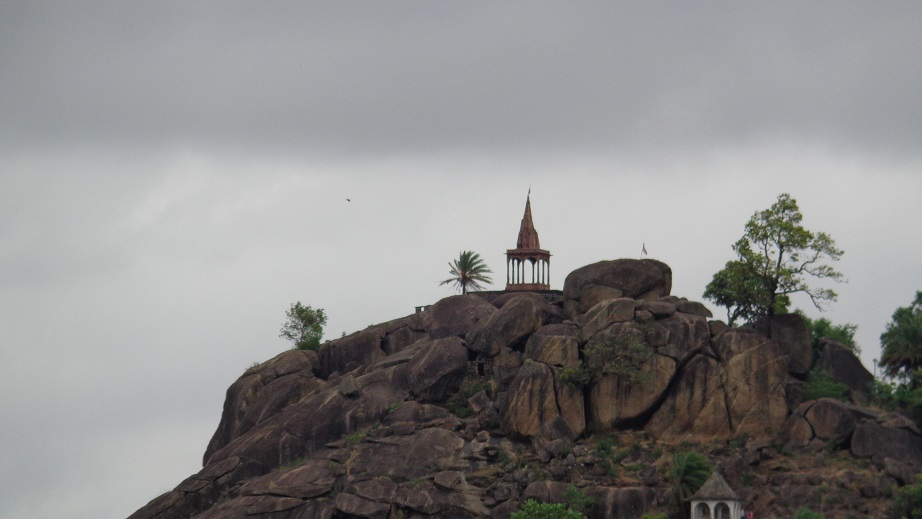
View of Tagore Hill

The Tagore Hill also known as Morabadi Hill is situated in Morabadi, Ranchi, Jharkhand. It is around 300 meter high (900 feet) and 4 kilometers away from Albert Ekka Chowk. The hilltop has a long associated history with the revered poet and Nobel Laureate Rabindranath Tagore. Rabindranath Tagore's elder brother Jyotirindranath Tagore settled here in 1912 after the death of his wife, Kadambari Devi. He built a house named Shanti Dham and a monument named Brahma Sthal. He later died in 1925. The Centre of Divyayan and Agararian Vocational Institute along with the Ramakrishna Mission Ashram is also located in the premises of this hill. It's a place of attraction for Jharkhand Tourism due to its connection with the elder brother of the great poet Rabindranath Tagore‌.
