= List of neighbourhoods of Ranchi =

Coordinates: 23.36°N 85.33°E

Following are the neighborhoods of Ranchi, Jharkhand, India.

== Major residential areas ==
=== Hind Piri ===
Hind Piri is located in the heart of Ranchi city, the prime residential area which is densely populated faces Main Road Old Commissioner's Compound and PP Compound. the place has many Schools, Hospitals, Banks and Colleges at its vicinity. Hind Piri is One of the oldest residential colony in Ranchi. The Ranchi Daily Market which is city's main vegetables and fruit market, is located at northern end of the colony along with New Market, which deals in electronic goods. Guru Nanak Higher Secondary School is flanking it from south. on the north west of the colony lies Marwari College. it is easily accessible by Railway station, Bus stop and Airport from main road. it is also adjacent to Sainik Market, Anjuman Market, Hi Street Mall and, Hotel Capitol Hills

=== CMPDI ===
Central Mine Planning and Design Institute Limited (CMPDIL) is one of the eight subsidiary of Coal India Limited (CIL) with its headquarters at Ranchi. CMPDIL came into existence in 1975 after nationalization of coal mines and as the name suggests became planning and design subsidiary of CIL. CMPDIL now gives services in exploration, planning & design, coal preparation, Coal Bed Methane (CBM)′ and research & development in coal sector and has clients spread across India and globe. The colony is based in the Kanke road. The colony has a State Bank of India inside the campus. Gondwana School inside the campus has been run by CMPDI for the last 25 years. The Colony also has a tennis court, play ground, Community hall and Mayuri hall. It has a Ladies club (Mahila Sabha) which donates towards blind students at Birsa Blind school. The colony is 8.7 km from Ranchi Railway Station and 12.3 km from Airport.

=== Ashok Nagar ===
This cooperative society colony was established in 1975. This colony was formed by Senior Bihar Govt employees. The colony has 500 plots. The size of the plot varies from 5,000 sq ft (460 m^{2}) to 12000 sq ft (type d to type a). The colony has 4 cricket ground size parks and one temple. The colony is based in the heart of the city. The colony is 3 km from Railway Station and 4 km from Airport.

=== SAIL Satellite colony ===
Established in 1990, the colony was created exclusively for employees of the Steel Authority of India Limited (SAIL) posted in Ranchi. Besides the residential units, the colony features Children's Park, Play Grounds, BasketBall & Tennis Courts, Recreation Centre and much more."Morning Stars Football Club" is also situated in this colony. This Club was established in 2000 by a group of Sail Employees. Delhi Public School, a major school of Ranchi is located inside this colony. It is also a very peaceful and quiet colony. It has houses of 400 square feet (37 m^{2}) to 1500 sq.feet.

=== Resaldar Nagar ===
Resaldar Nagar was established in 1975, major residents are Muslims. The speciality of this area is that the whole area was occupied within three years - now there are no more vacant plots. It is situated in the very heart of city near Rajendra chowk and Over Bridge. This is the most reputed area for Muslim and the best colony for Muslims. Most of the people are highly literate. It is named after a Baba named Resaldar.

=== Lalpur ===
Lalpur Chowk, an important locality of Ranchi, is an intersection (chowk meaning "intersection") is at the intersection of Circular and Old Hazaribagh Road (old HB Road in short). The word chowk is a Hindi word meaning intersection. The area has several shops and important commercial establishments. Circular Road ends at the subsequent chowk, namely, Dangratoli Chowk, where Circular Road meets Purulia Road. In the opposite direction, the Circular Road takes one to Kutchery area of Ranchi. From there, it forks to Ratu Road and Kanke Road. Old HB Road continues until it meets the new Hazaribagh Road. In the opposite direction it leads to Firayalal chowk, which is one of the busiest intersections in Ranchi. Lalpur Chowk also leads to Peace Road.

There are major residential areas around Lalpur chowk. Burdwan Compound, BSNL colony, Lower Burdwan compound etc. Burdwan Compound has a large population of Bengalis. Burdwan Compound is so named because it was the estate of the king of Burdwan, a district in West Bengal.

=== Harmu Housing Colony ===
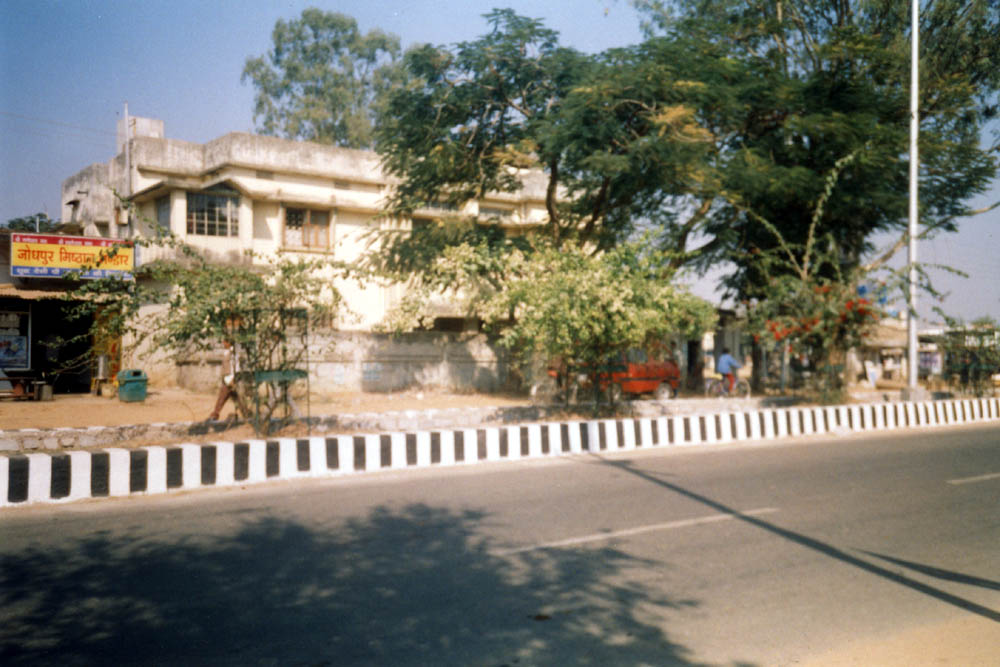
A view of Harmu Colony

Harmu Housing Colony is one of the largest residential areas of Ranchi. The Colony was established during the early 1960s, and has since rapidly expanded. Currently 2016, it has, apart from residential houses and apartments, a number of trading and commercial establishments; government offices; schools and hospitals, and other civic facilities. The neighboring areas of Harmu housing Colony are Argora and Ashok Nagar in South, Kishore Gunj in North and New AG Cooperative colony in East. India cricket captain MS Dhoni's house is located here.. Many high rise apartments are being built in this area and property prices are very high.

=== Kantatoli Colony ===
Kantatoli Colony also known as Netaji Nagar, is one of the popular residential areas of Ranchi. Kantatoli Colony/Netaji Nagar is famous for its cultural events and especially for the Durga Puja celebrations. It was set up to rehabilitate the refugees from East Bengal after the partition. It is adjacent to the Birsa Bus Terminus.

=== AG Co-Operative Colony ===
AG Co-Operative Colony includes A.G.Colony Kadru both are coming under the society of A.G Office Employees Housing Society is becoming very expensive locality in Ranchi. Children Park in new AG cooperative colony is the building ground for fresh cricketing talent.

=== Morhabadi ===
Morhabadi is a residential Neighbourhood in Ranchi in India. It houses the famous Morhabadi Maidan, Birsa Munda football stadium, Asto Turf hockey stadium and Tagore hill. Morhabadi Maidan hosts various fairs or 'mela' round the year. it is surrounded by various parks such as Ram Dayal Munda Park, Sidhu Kanhu Park, Oxygen park, Dada Dadi park, Gandhi park, nigam park etc which makes it a place for joggers and strollers.

== Other localities ==
- Resaldar Nagar
- MECON Shyamali colony
- HEC colony
- NIFFT Colony
- Hinoo
- Argora
- A.G. Colony, Kadru
- Burdwan Compound
- Old Commissioner's Compound
- Jawahar Nagar
- Gandhi Nagar
- Tharpakhna
- Kusai Colony
- Rahmat Colony
- Pathalkudwa
- Purani Ranchi
- Indrapuri
- Shivpuri
- South Office Para
- North Office Para
- Bariatu Sarhul nagar
- Nagra Toli
- Bhitta
- Shastri Nagar
- Morhabadi
- Shashi Vihar Colony (Cheshire Home Road, Bariatu)
- Budh Vihar
- Hesag
