= Chutupalu =

- Village
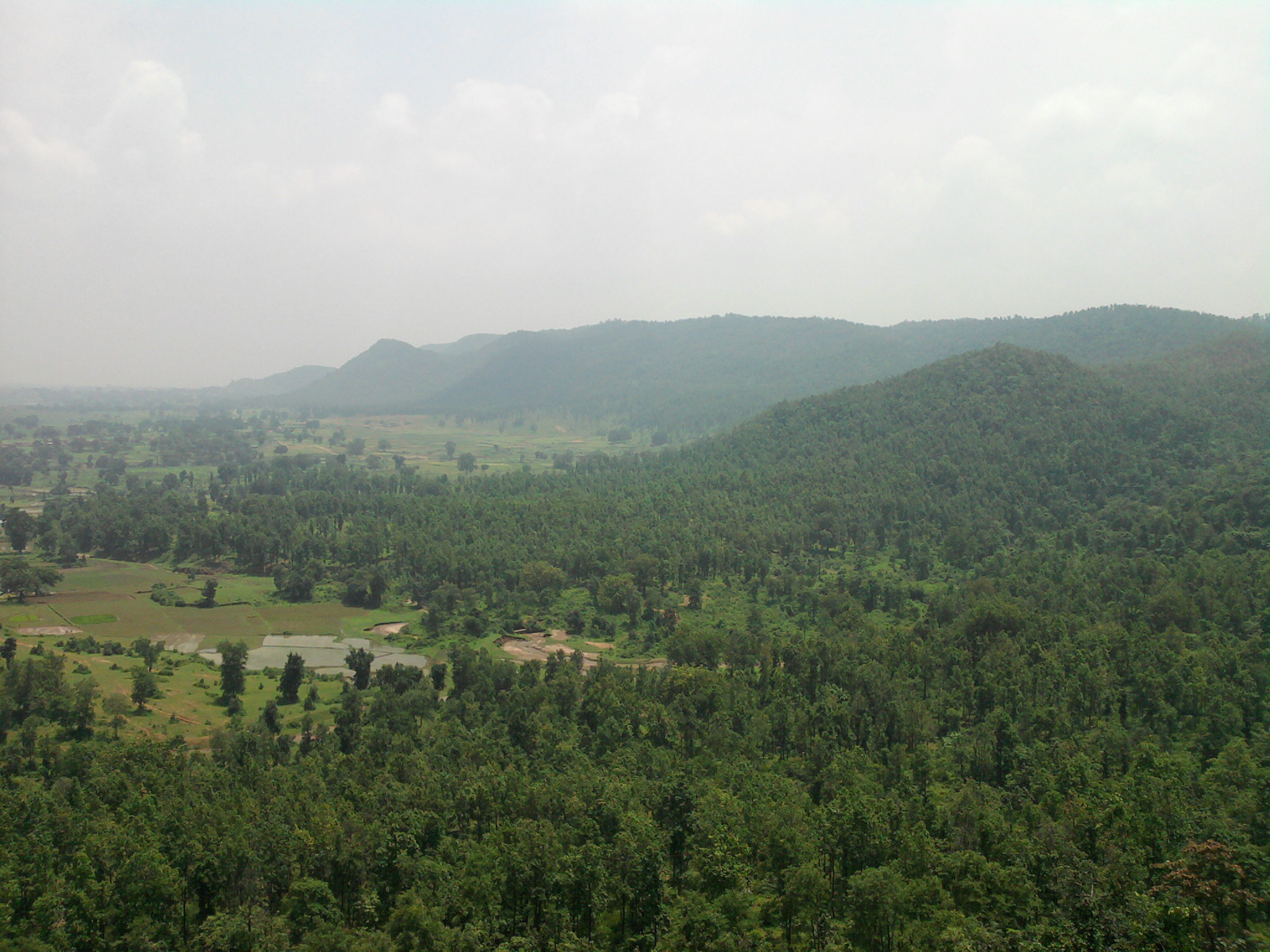
- View from the Ranchi Plateau between Ramgarh and Chutupalu

- Location in Jharkhand, India3 Chutupalu (India)
- Coordinates: 23.5788°N 85.5174°E
- Country: India
- State: Jharkhand
- District: Ranchi

Government
  - Type: Federal democracy

Population (2011)
  - Total: 1,980

Languages (*For language details see Ormanjhi block#Language and religion)
  - Official: Hindi, Urdu
- Time zone: UTC+5:30 (IST)
- PIN: 835219
- Telephone/ STD code: 06530
- Vehicle registration: JH 01
- Literacy: 80.40%
- Lok Sabha constituency: Ranchi
- Vidhan Sabha constituency: Ranchi
- Website: ranchi.nic.in

Chutupalu is a village in the Ormanjhi CD block in the Ranchi Sadar subdivision of the Ranchi district in the Indian state of Jharkhand.

== History ==
Tikait Umrao Singh and Sheikh Bhikhari, two brave hearts, tried to stop, at Chutupalu, the British forces from occupying Ranchi, during the Indian Rebellion of 1857, by cutting down trees and damaging culverts. Later, the British hanged them from a banyan tree in 1858 at Chutpalu ghati.

== Geography ==
Cities, towns and locations in Ranchi district in South Chotanagpur Division
M: municipality, CT: census town, R: rural/ urban centre, N: neighbourhood, T: tourist centre, D: dam, H: historical/ religious centre
Owing to space constraints in the small map, the actual locations in a larger map may vary slightly

=== Location ===
Chutupalu is located at 23.5788°N 85.5174°E.

=== Area overview ===
The map alongside shows a part of the Ranchi plateau, most of it at an average elevation of 2,140 feet above sea level. Only a small part in the north-eastern part of the district is the lower Ranchi plateau, spread over Silli, Rahe, Sonahatu and Tamar CD blocks, at an elevation of 500 to 1,000 feet above sea level. There is a 16 km long ridge south-west of Ranchi. There are isolated hills in the central plateau. The principal river of the district, the Subarnarekha, originates near Ratu, flows in an easterly direction and descends from the plateau, with a drop of about 300 feet at Hundru Falls. Subarnarekha and other important rivers are marked on the map. The forested area is shaded in the map. A major part of the North Karanpura Area and some fringe areas of the Piparwar Area of the Central Coalfields Limited, both located in the North Karanpura Coalfield, are in Ranchi district. There has been extensive industrial activity in Ranchi district, since independence. Ranchi district is the first in the state in terms of population. 8.83% of the total population of the state lives in this district - 56.9% is rural population and 43.1% is urban population.

Note: The map alongside presents some of the notable locations in the district. All places marked in the map are linked in the larger full screen map.

== Demographics ==
According to the 2011 Census of India, Chutupalu had a total population of 1,980, of which 1,002 (51%) were males and 978 (49%) were females. Population in the age range 0–6 years was 312. The total number of literate persons in Chutupalu was 1,117 (66.97% of the population over 6 years).

== Transport ==
National Highway 20 (earlier NH 33) (Ranchi-Ramgarh-Hazaribagh Road), an important roadway in Ranchi district, passes through Chutupalu.

== Education ==
Chutupalu Middle School is a Hindi-medium coeducational institution established in 1954. It has facilities for teaching from class I to class VIII.

Sanghamitra Teacher Training College, established by the World Buddha Foundation of Bodh Gaya at Chutupalu, offers a degree course in education.
