= Association for Parivartan of Nation =

Indian Non Profit Organization

Association for Parivartan of Nation (abbreviated as APNA) is a nonprofit organisation based in Ranchi, Jharkhand, India, established in 2019. The organisation focuses on enhancing the implementation of rights-based legislations and promoting legal empowerment among marginalised communities. A significant part of its work involves facilitating access to entitlements under the Right to Education Act, 2009 (RTE), particularly in under-resourced areas of Jharkhand.

In addition to education-related advocacy, APNA undertakes initiatives aimed at strengthening community participation in governance, promoting digital inclusion, and building legal awareness at the grassroots level. The organisation engages in activities such as legal literacy campaigns, social audits, field research, and strategic litigation on child rights and education issues.

APNA operates primarily in districts with high concentrations of marginalised groups, including Scheduled Castes, Scheduled Tribes, Other Backward Classes, and persons with disabilities. It collaborates with community-based organisations, government bodies, and academic institutions to advance its objectives.

The organisation's work has been cited or featured in several national media outlets, including The Telegraph, The Times of India, and The Indian Express.

== Activities ==
APNA has been actively involved in promoting access to education for children from marginalised communities, particularly through its efforts to facilitate implementation of Section 12(1)(c) of the Right to Education Act, 2009 (RTE). This provision mandates that private unaided schools reserve 25 percent of their entry-level seats for children from economically weaker sections and disadvantaged groups. The organisation has conducted awareness camps, legal aid sessions, and capacity-building workshops to help eligible families navigate the application and admission process under this provision.

In addition to direct community engagement, APNA has utilised the Right to Information Act, 2005 to gather data on the status of RTE implementation in Jharkhand. This includes filing RTI applications to obtain official records on seat allocations, admissions, and utilisation rates. The data obtained has been used to support advocacy efforts and initiate evidence-based dialogue with local authorities and educational institutions. According to multiple media reports citing RTI findings, a significant proportion of the reserved seats in Ranchi’s private schools remained unfilled in several academic years, indicating gaps in enforcement and awareness of the policy.

In some cases, the organisation has also provided legal assistance to families facing denial of admission or procedural irregularities. It has advocated for improved transparency in the online admission system and sought the involvement of local authorities in monitoring compliance with the RTE Act.

== Founder ==
APNA was founded by Hasan Al Banna, a lawyer from Jharkhand. He was awarded the Marang Gomke Jaipal Singh Munda Overseas Scholarship, a flagship initiative of the Government of Jharkhand created to support the state’s “next generation of leaders” in pursuing advanced studies abroad. A graduate of Jamia Millia Islamia University in Delhi, he pursued an LLM in Law and Globalisation at the University of Bristol Law School, United Kingdom. His work through APNA has been profiled in Indian media for promoting equitable access to education.

== Scholarly / International Recognition ==
Hasan Al Banna’s work has been cited internationally in connection with APNA’s legal empowerment efforts. A Lund University conference publication, Empowering Children and Youth through Law and Participation (2023), discusses his background, APNA’s volunteer network, and its Project 21A, which leverages RTE Section 12(1)(c) and strategic use of law to support disadvantaged children’s access to private schools.

== Rights-based Approach ==
As described on sectoral platforms, APNA frames its work around rights-based development. Instead of viewing marginalised groups as passive beneficiaries, it recognises them as active rights-holders with agency to claim entitlements. This framing underpins its interventions at the intersection of law, governance, technology, and community participation.

== Partnerships ==
APNA engages with government departments, civil society groups, and academic institutions to advance rights-based entitlements and digital inclusion. Its approach is consistent with broader UN and multilateral frameworks on education access, social equity, and community empowerment.

== Recognition ==
- Coverage in national newspapers including The Telegraph, The Times of India, and The Indian Express.
- Citation in an international academic publication by Lund University.
- Profiles on sectoral platforms such as iVolunteer and AikyamJobs.
