= Nakshatra Van =

Park in Jharkhand, India

Coordinates: 23.381°N 85.321°E

Nakshatra Van is a park created by the Jharkhand Forest Department in front of the residence of the governor of Jharkhand in Ranchi, the capital of the Indian state of Jharkhand.

A Nakshatra or lunar mansion is one of the 27 or 28 divisions of the sky that the Moon passes through during its monthly cycle, as used in Hindu astronomy and Hindu astrology. Each Nakshatra is identified by its prominent star(s) and is associated with a Zodiac. Hindu astrologers believe that each constellation of the zodiac is associated with a tree. Those trees are of medicinal, social, aesthetic or economic value.

== History ==
The foundation stone for the park was laid by Sri L. K. Advani, Deputy Prime Minister of India in 2002. He planted a Vikankat on that day. The responsibility for planning and developing the park was given to Social Forestry Division. Department officials visited a Zodiac Park in Bangalore to study the concept. Scientists from the Indian Institute of Astro-Physics were consulted in the planning process. It took around two years to complete the construction of the park. The park was opened after a colourful programme on the occasion of Van Mahotsav in 2004. The park was inaugurated by Governor M. Rama Jois and many other dignitaries. The administration and management of the park was transferred to Jharkhand State Forest Development Corporation in 2004.
