= Sheikh Bhikhari =

Indian freedom fighter

Sheikh Bhikhari Ansari
- Born: 2 October 1819; Chutupalu, Ranchi district, Chotanagpur, (now in Jharkhand)
- Died: 8 January 1858 (aged 38); Ramgarh
- Occupations: Diwan and Commander
- Known for: Freedom struggle in Indian Rebellion of 1857

Sheikh Bhikhari Ansari (1819-1858) was born on 2 Oct 1819 in a weaver Ansari family at Lotwa-Khudia Village located in the city of Ranchi, Jharkhand, India. He fought in the Revolt of 1857 against the British rule in India. Sheikh Bhikhari Ansari was a craftsman who prepared coarse clothes and earned his livelihood by selling them in the local Haat market since childhood.

A Dewan and general of Tikait Umrao Singh, he was a combatant in the Indian Rebellion of 1857. He prevented East India Company forces from occupying Ranchi by cutting down trees in Chutupalu in order to obstruct their advance prior to engaging Company forces. The British hanged him alongside Tikait Umrao Singh from a banyan tree in Chutupalu on January 8, 1858.

== Legacy ==
The Sheikh Bikhari Administrative Block in Mega Sports Complex, Ranchi is named after Sheikh Bhikhari.
