= Pahari Mandir =

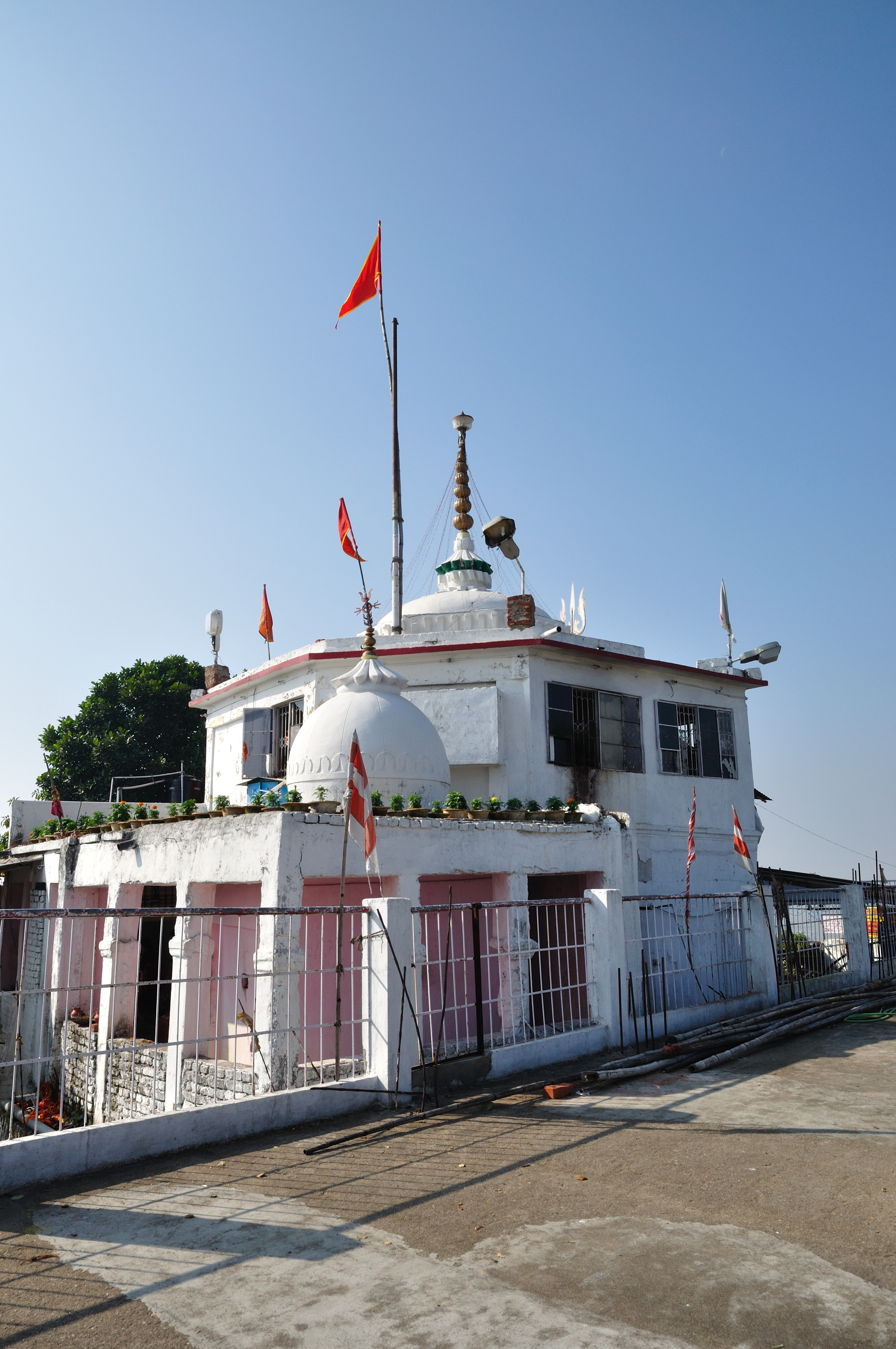
- Pahari Mandir on the top of hill

- Location in Jharkhand

Religion
- Affiliation: Hinduism
- District: Ranchi
- Deity: Shiva
- Festivals: Shraavana, Maha Shivaratri
- Governing body: Pahari Mandir Vikas Samiti

Location
- Location: Ranchi
- State: Jharkhand
- Country: India
- Coordinates: 23.375°N 85.311°E

Architecture
- Elevation: 652.27 m (2,140 ft)

Pahari Mandir is a temple located on a hilltop in Ranchi the capital of Jharkhand. The temple is dedicated to Shiva. This temple is located at 2140 feet above sea level and 350 feet above the ground. Shiva is worshipped in linga form in the hill temple. There is a large crowd of Shiva devotees come here during the month of Shivaratri and Sawan.

This temple of Shiva situated on the mountain was in the possession of the British before the independence of the country and they used to hang the freedom fighters here. Since the partition of India, the national flag has also been hoisted on Independence Day and Republic Day along with religious flags on this temple. This is the first temple in the country where the tricolor is hoisted.

This temple of Shiva, located 7 km from Ranchi railway station, is also known as Pahari Temple. The old name of the Pahari Baba temple was Tiriburu, which later changed to 'Hanging Gallows' in British times, because freedom fighters were hanged here under the British Raj.

After independence, the first tricolor flag was hoisted here in Ranchi, which was hoisted by a freedom fighter K. C. Das of Ranchi. He hoisted the tricolor in memory and honor of the martyred freedom fighters here. Since that time, the tricolor is hoisted here on Independence Day and Republic Day every year. There is a stone in the hill temple, on which the message of freedom of the country is written on the midnight of August 14 and 15, 1947.
