= Heavy Engineering Corporation =

Public Sector Undertaking in Ranchi, Jharkhand, India

Heavy Engineering Corporation Ltd.
- Type: Central Public Sector Undertaking
- Founded: 1958; 68 years ago
- Founder: Government of India
- Headquarters: Ranchi, Jharkhand, India
- Key people: Shri K.S. Murthy (Chairman & MD)
- Products: Steel Plant and its equipment; Mining equipment; Crushing equipment; Mineral processing products; Castings and forgings; Machine Tools; Crane and Heavy crane; Turn-key Projects; Special equipment: Defence Sector equipments; Space Application equipments; nuclear power sector equipments
- Owner: Government of India (100%)
- Parent: Ministry of Heavy Industries, Government of India
- Website: hecltd.com/index.php

Heavy Engineering Corporation Limited or HECL is a Public Sector Undertaking (PSU) in Ranchi, Jharkhand, India. HECL was established in the year 1958 as one of the largest Integrated Engineering Complex in India. It is owned by the Government of India, with administrative control under the Ministry of Heavy Industries. It manufactures and supplies capital equipments & machineries and renders project execution required for core sector industries. It has complete manufacturing set up starting from casting & forging, fabrication, machining, assembly and testing - all at one location, Ranchi, backed by a design - engineering and technology team.

== HECL's Plants ==
It consists of the following units:

=== Heavy Machine Building Plant (HMBP) ===
The Plant has a fenced area of 5,70,000 square metres and a floor area of nearly 2,00,000 sq.m. It is engaged in design and manufacture of equipment and components for steel plant, mining, mineral processing, crushers, material handling, cranes, power, cement, aluminium, space research, nuclear power, etc.It is the most important part of HEC.it consists of many type of huge machine, like lathe machine, drill machine, compressor etc.

=== Heavy Machine Tools Plant (HMTP) ===
Set up in collaboration with M/s Skodaexport Czechoslovakia, HMTP produces machine tools in heavier ranges. The Plant covers an area of over 2,13,500 sq.m. It designs and manufactures medium & heavy duty CNC and conventional Machine Tools for Railways, Defense, Ordnance Factories, HAL, Space and other strategic sectors.

=== Foundry Forge Plant (FFP) ===
It is the largest foundry and forging complex in India and one of the largest of its kind in the world. The area of the Plant is 13,16,930 sq.m accommodating 76,000 tonnes of installed machinery to cope up with the various operations effectively. This plant is the manufacturer of heavy castings and forgings for various HEC make equipment and related to steel plant, defence, power, nuclear energy, etc. Manufacturer of forged rolls for steel plants, crank shafts for railway locomotives, etc.

=== Projects Division ===
Design, engineering and execution of turnkey projects related to bulk material handling, steel plant projects, cement plant and other sectors.

== HECL's Products ==
=== Steel Plant and its equipment ===
- Blast Furnace
- Coke Oven Batteries
- Continuous Casting Machine
- Steel Melting Converters
- Forged Rolls

=== Mining equipment ===
- Hydraulic shovel (5 CuM)
- Electric Rope Shovel (5 CuM)
- Electric Rope Shovel (10 CuM)
- Draglines (20/90 and 24/96)
- P.G. Crusher

=== Crushing equipment and mineral processing products ===
- Primary Gyratory Crusher
- Cone Crusher
- Four Roll Crusher
- Reversible Hammer Crusher
- Rod Mill
- Machine Tools
- Vertical Turning & Milling Machine
- Lathe
- Roll Grinding Machine
- Deep Hole Boring Machine
- Horizontal boring machine
- Radial Drilling Machine
- Planning Machine
- Plano Milling Machine

=== Castings and forgings ===
- Steel Castings
- Steel Forgings
- Grey Iron Castings
- Non-Ferrous Castings

=== Crane ===
- Crane
- Heavy crane

== HECL's Quality Policy ==
“To achieve and maintain a leading position as supplies of reliable quality products, systems and services to meet customer needs and expectations”
