= MECON Limited =

Indian steel company

MECON LIMITED
- Native name: मेकॉन लिमिटेड
- Type: Central Public Sector Undertaking
- Industry: Consulting, P project management, contracting
- Founded: 1959; 67 years ago
- Headquarters: Vivekanand Path, Ranchi, Jharkhand, India
- Key people: Shri Sanjay Kumar Verma (Chairman and Managing Director)
- Owner: Ministry of Steel, Government of India
- Number of employees: 1485
- Website: www.meconlimited.co.in

MECON Limited, formerly known as Metallurgical & Engineering Consultants (India) Limited, is a central public sector undertaking under the Ministry of Steel, Government of India. The company was established in 1959 as the Central Engineering and Designing Bureau (CEDB) of the Hindustan Steel Limited (HSL), the first public sector steel company in India. In January 2025, MECON entered into a business cooperation agreement with Tata Steel.
