= Ranchi =

Capital of Jharkhand, India

- Metropolis
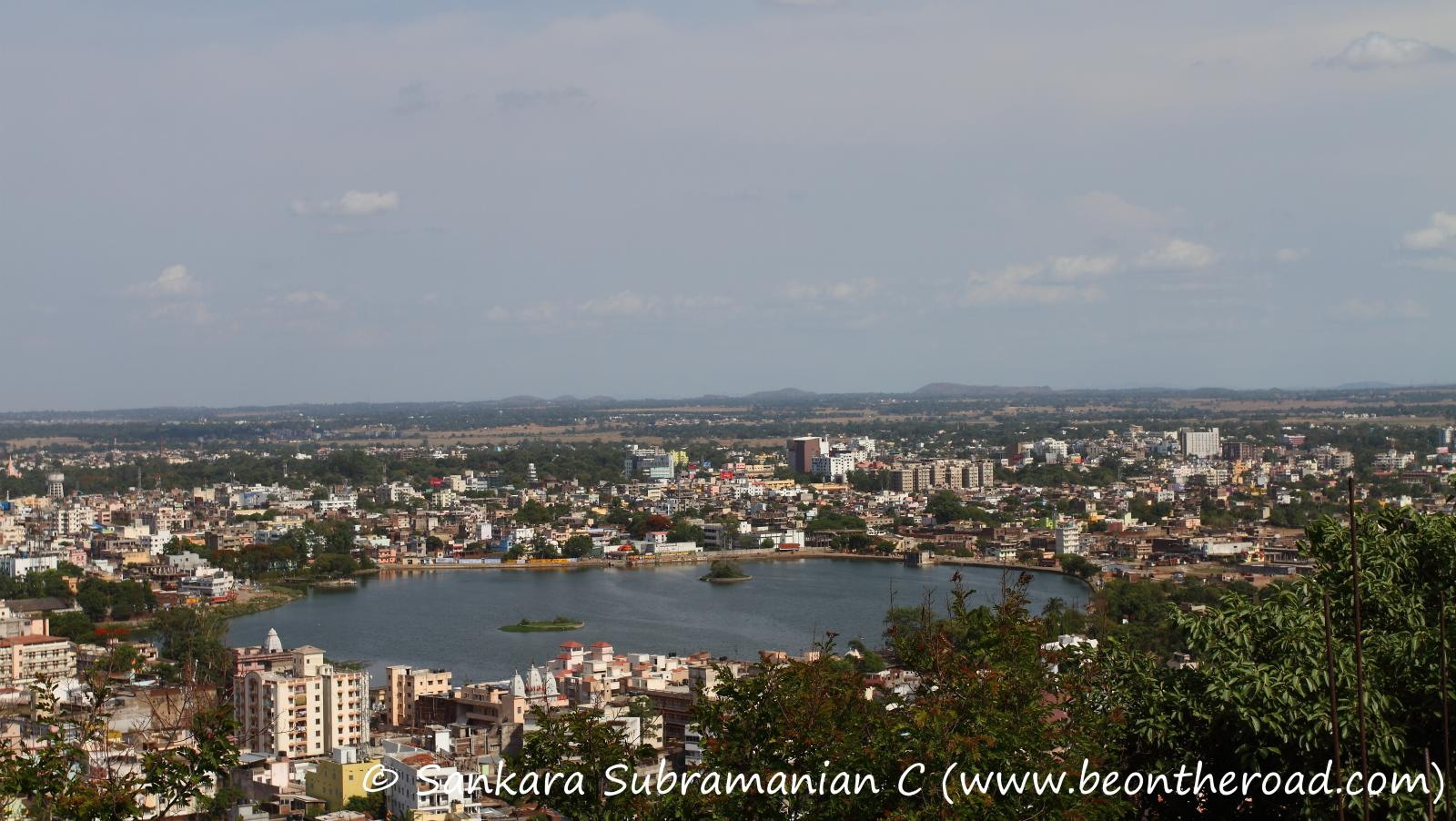
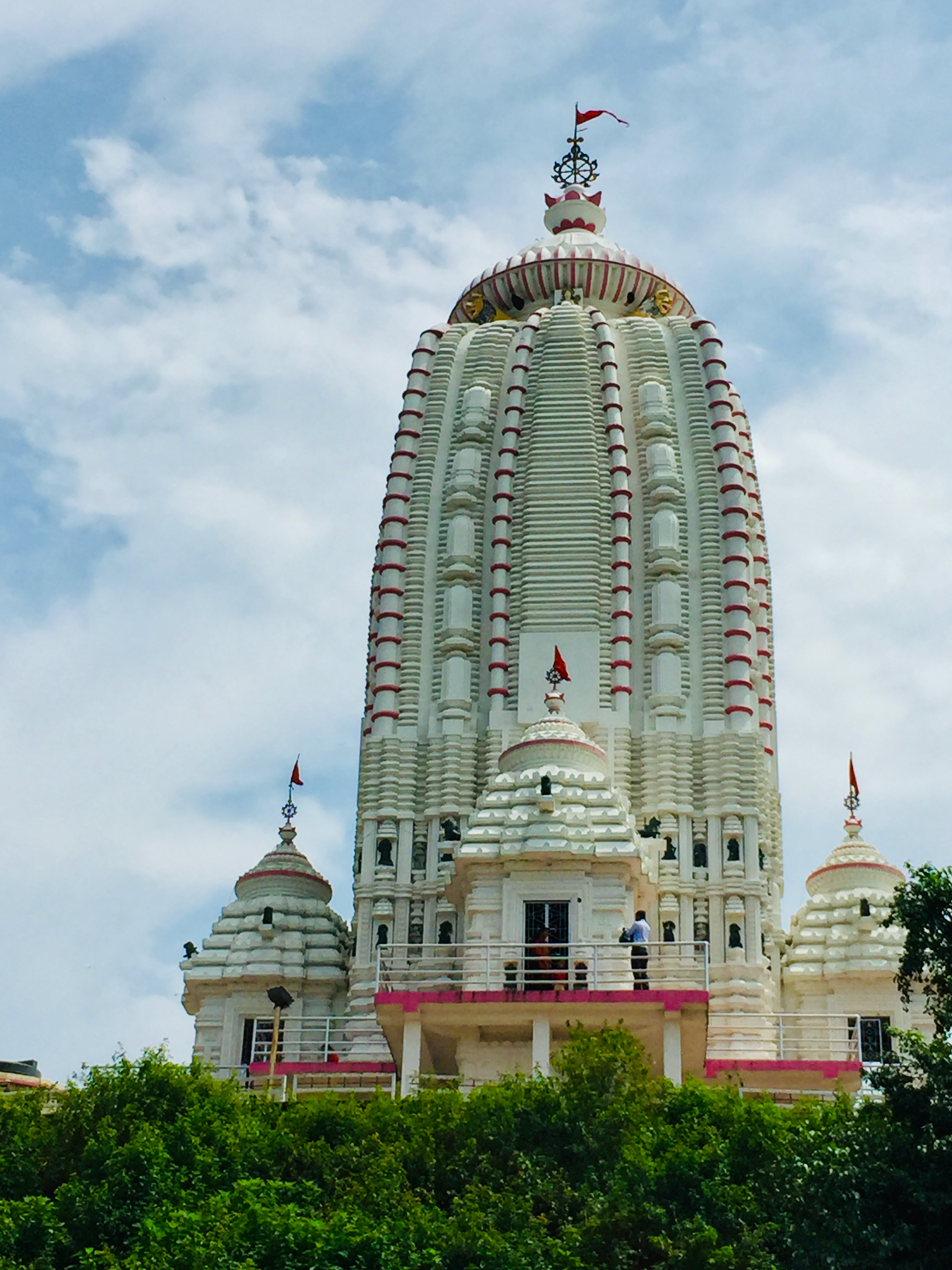
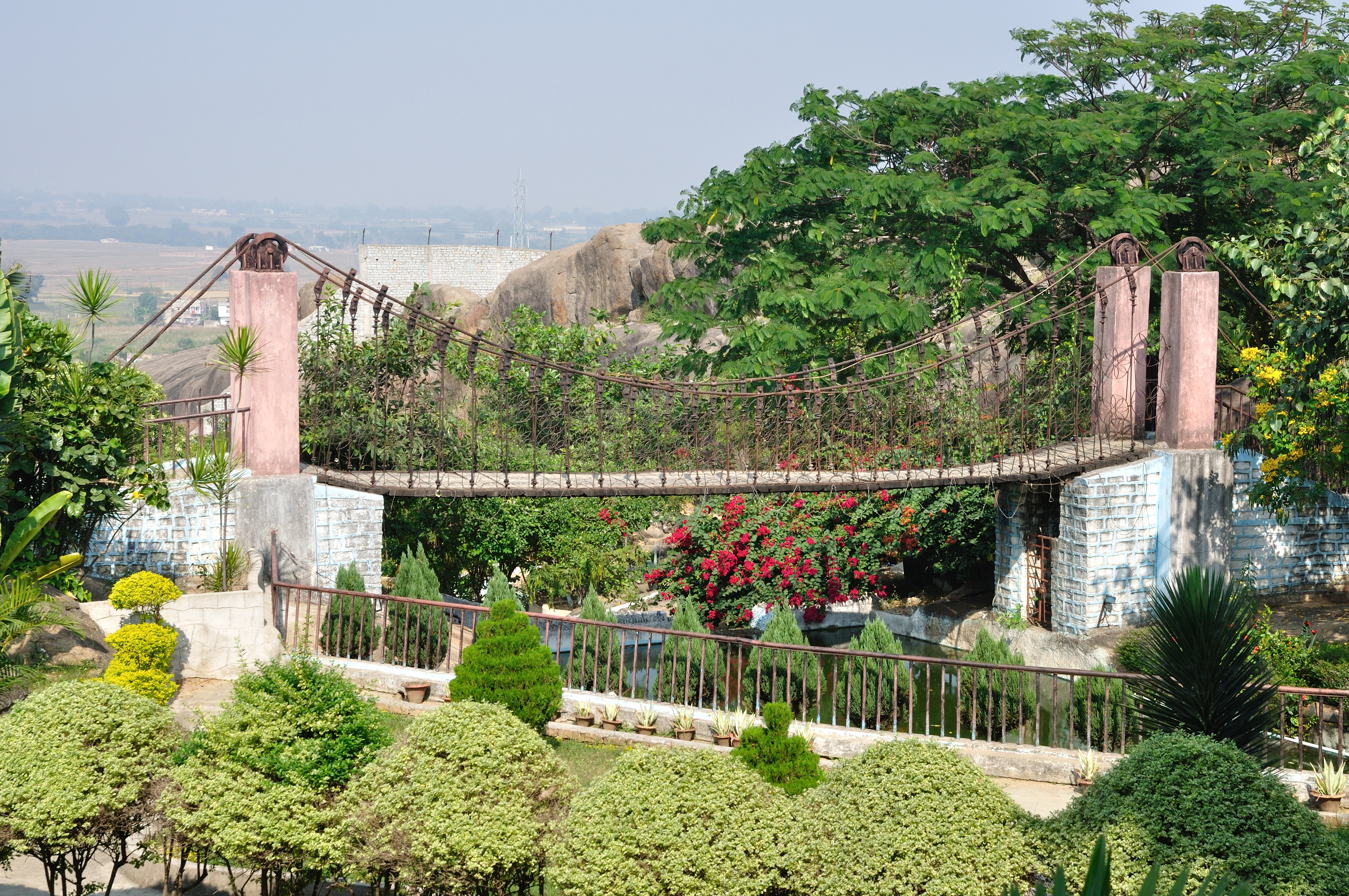
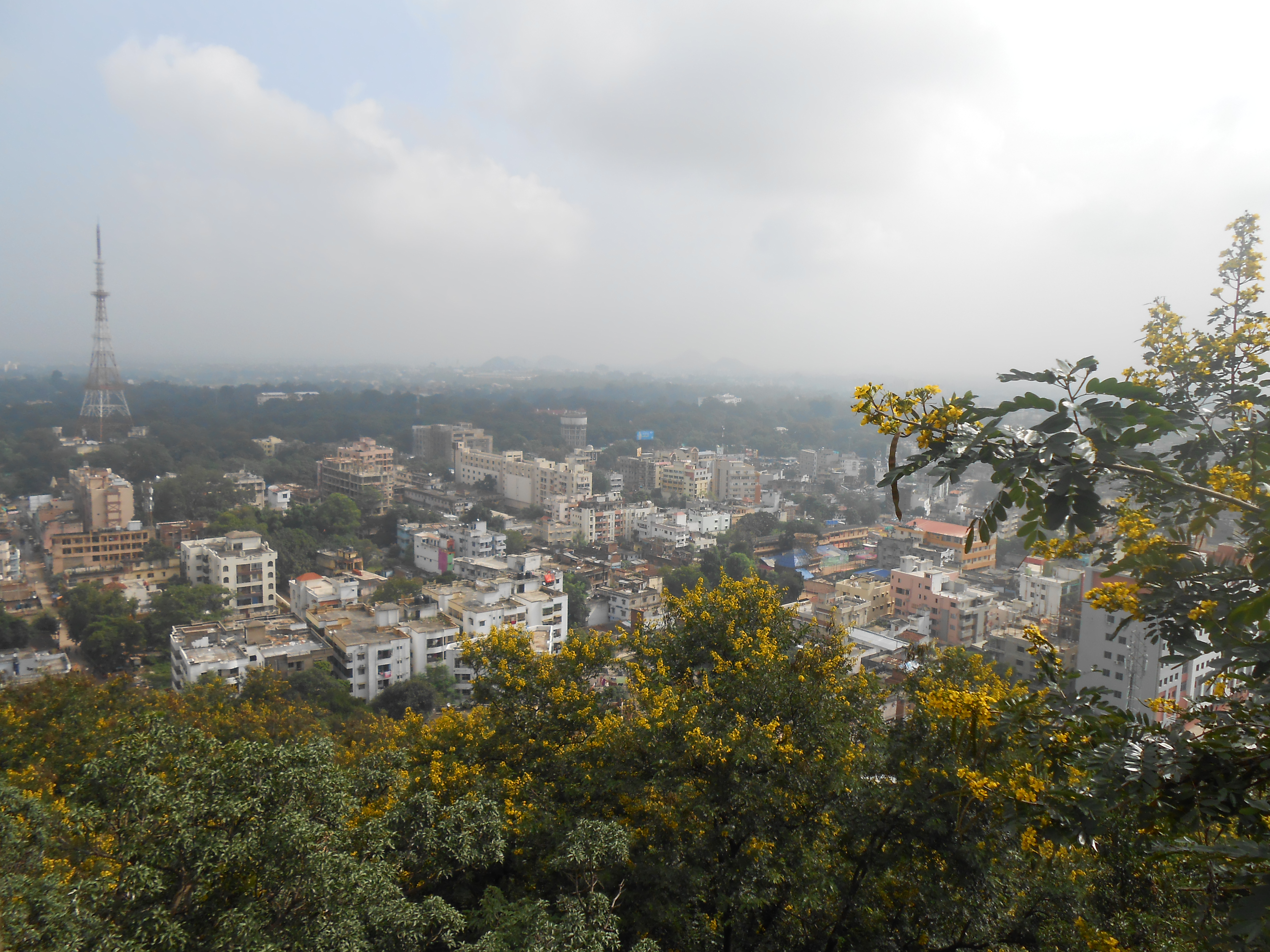
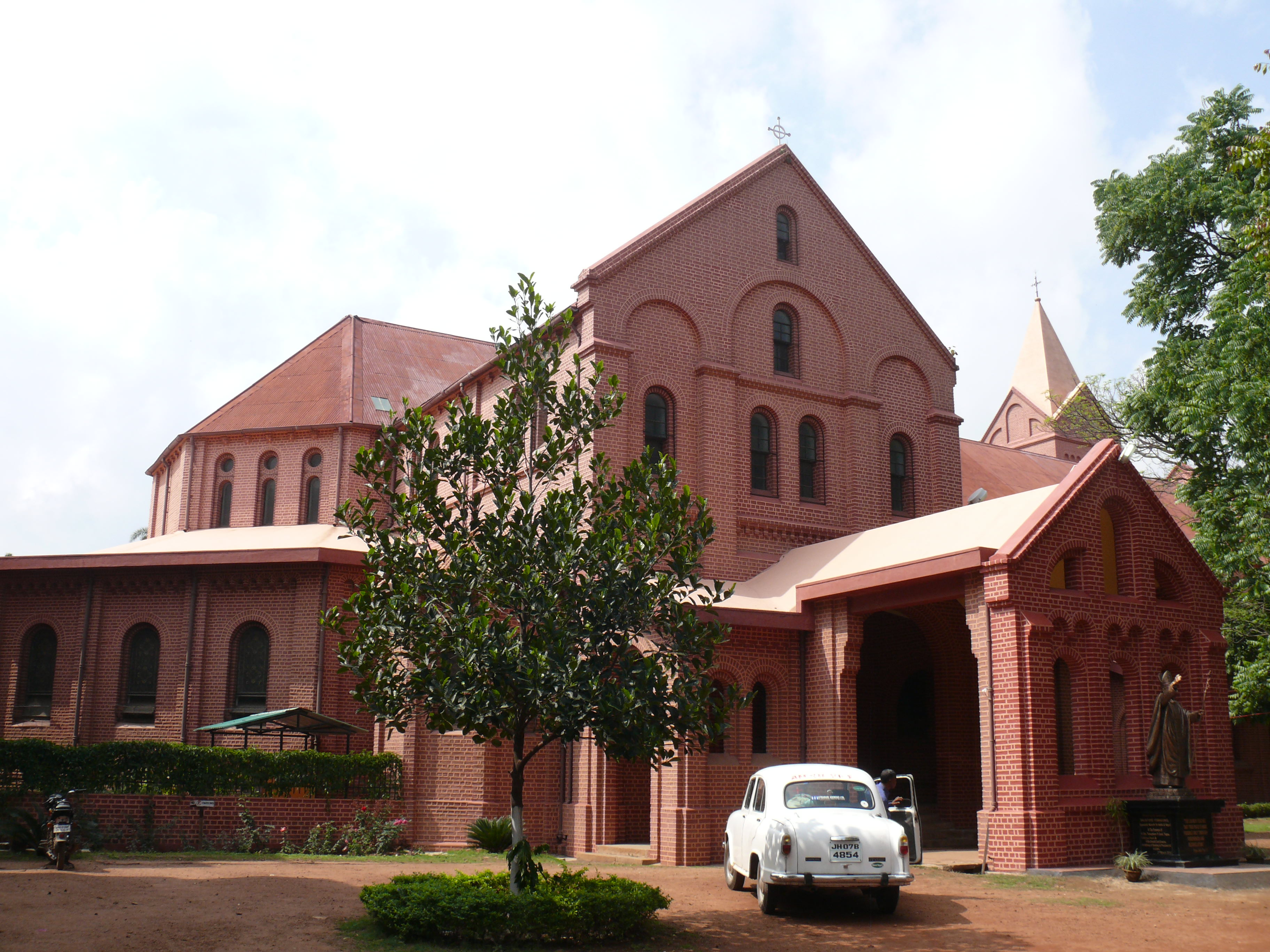
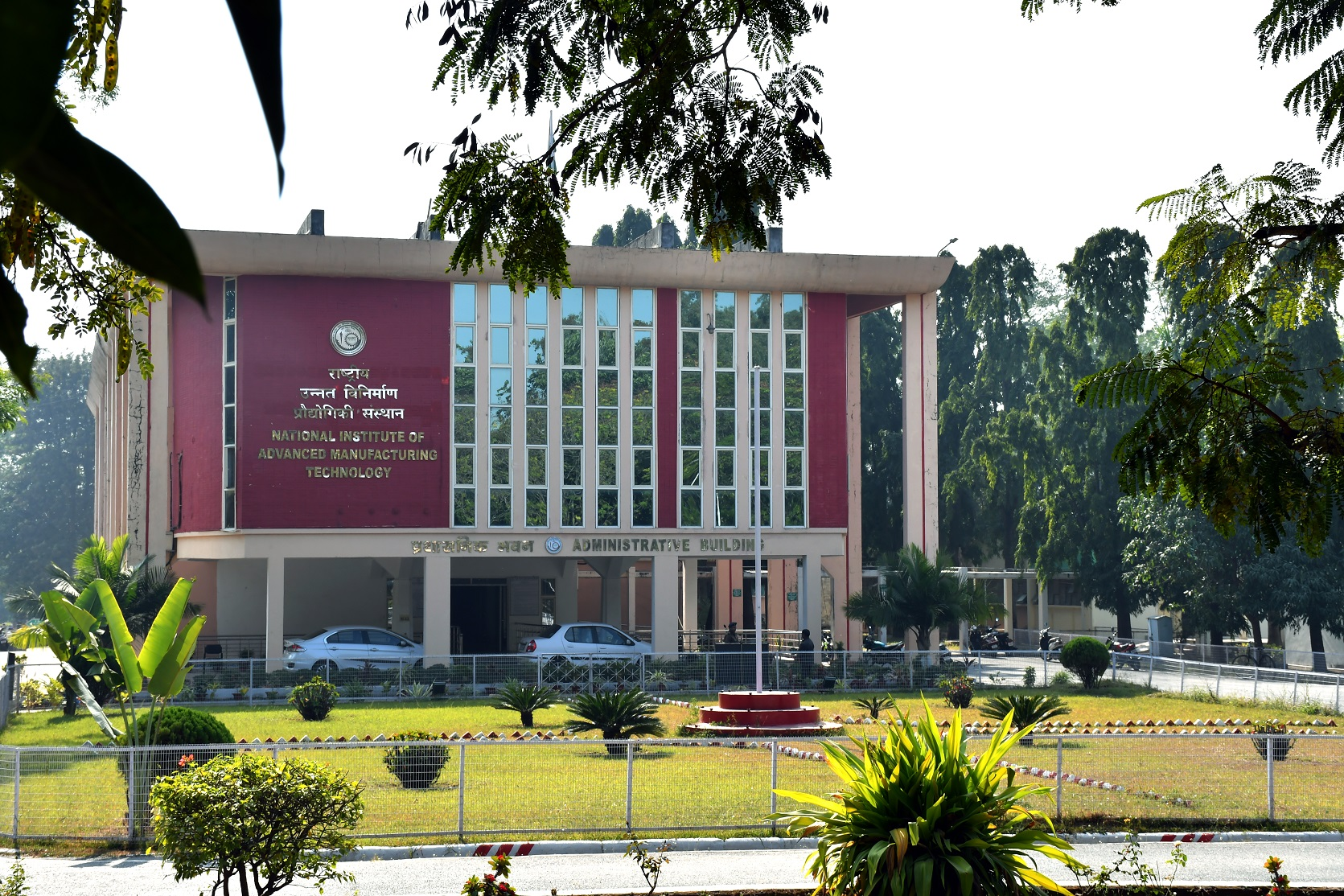
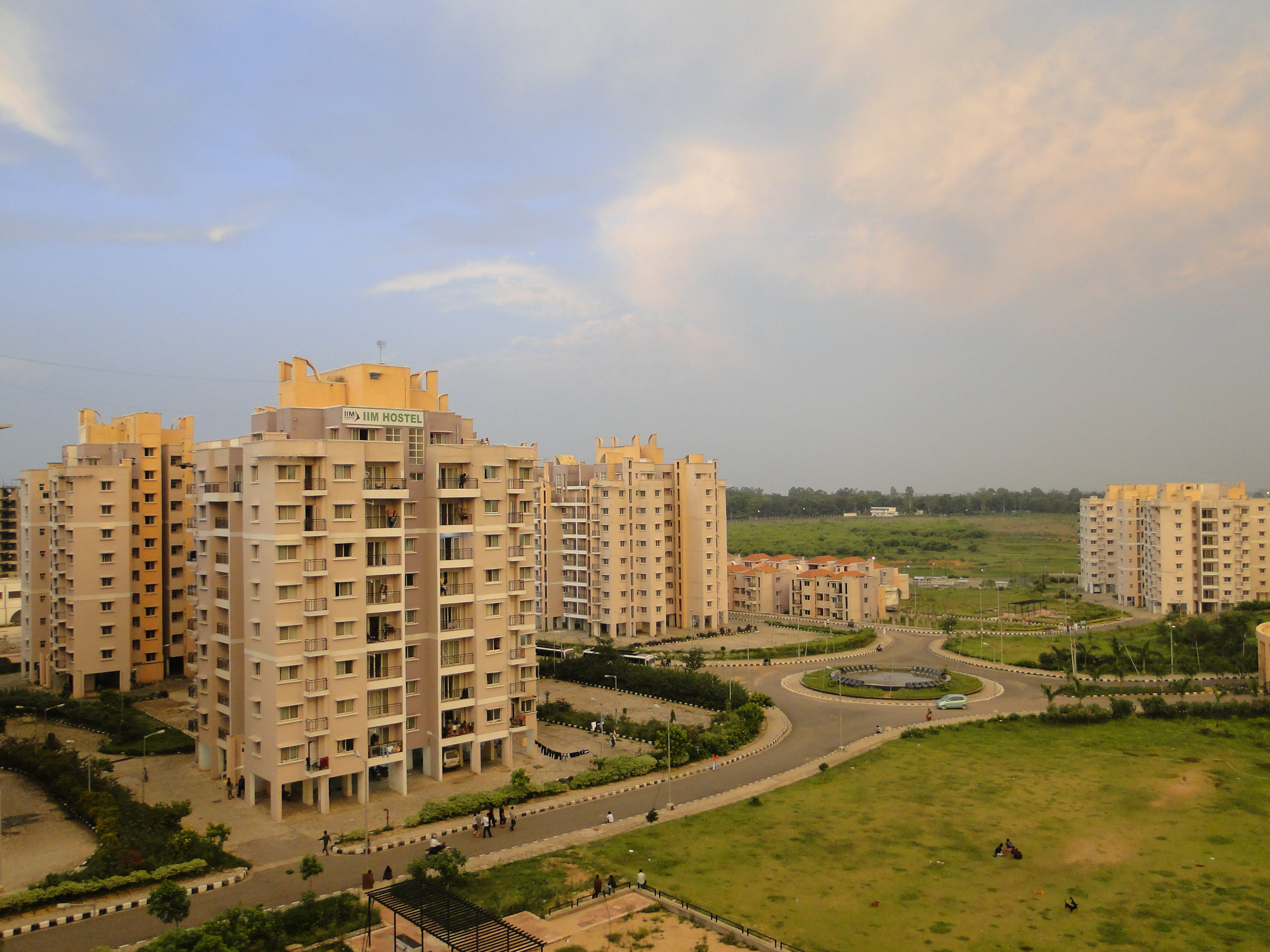
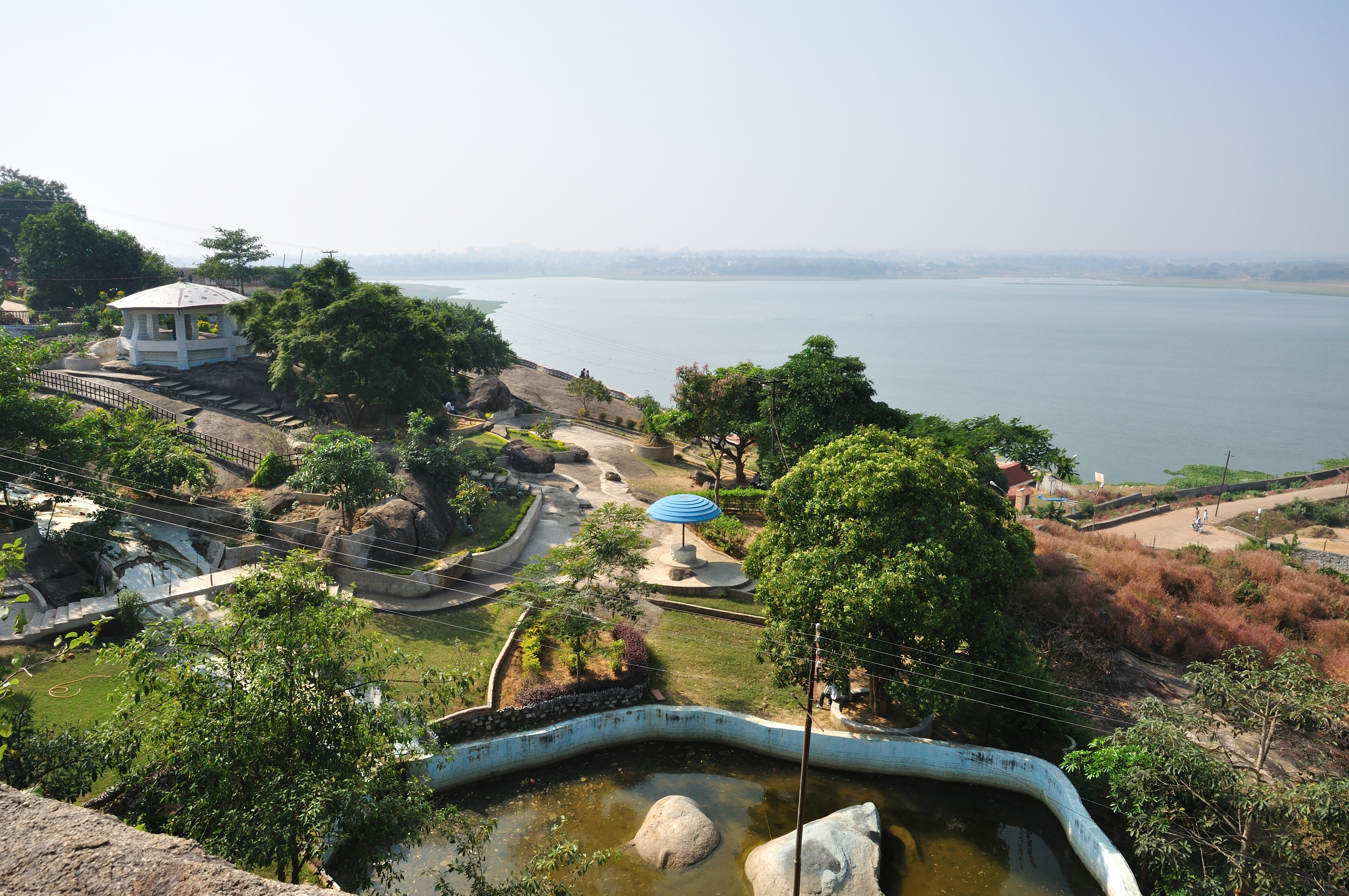
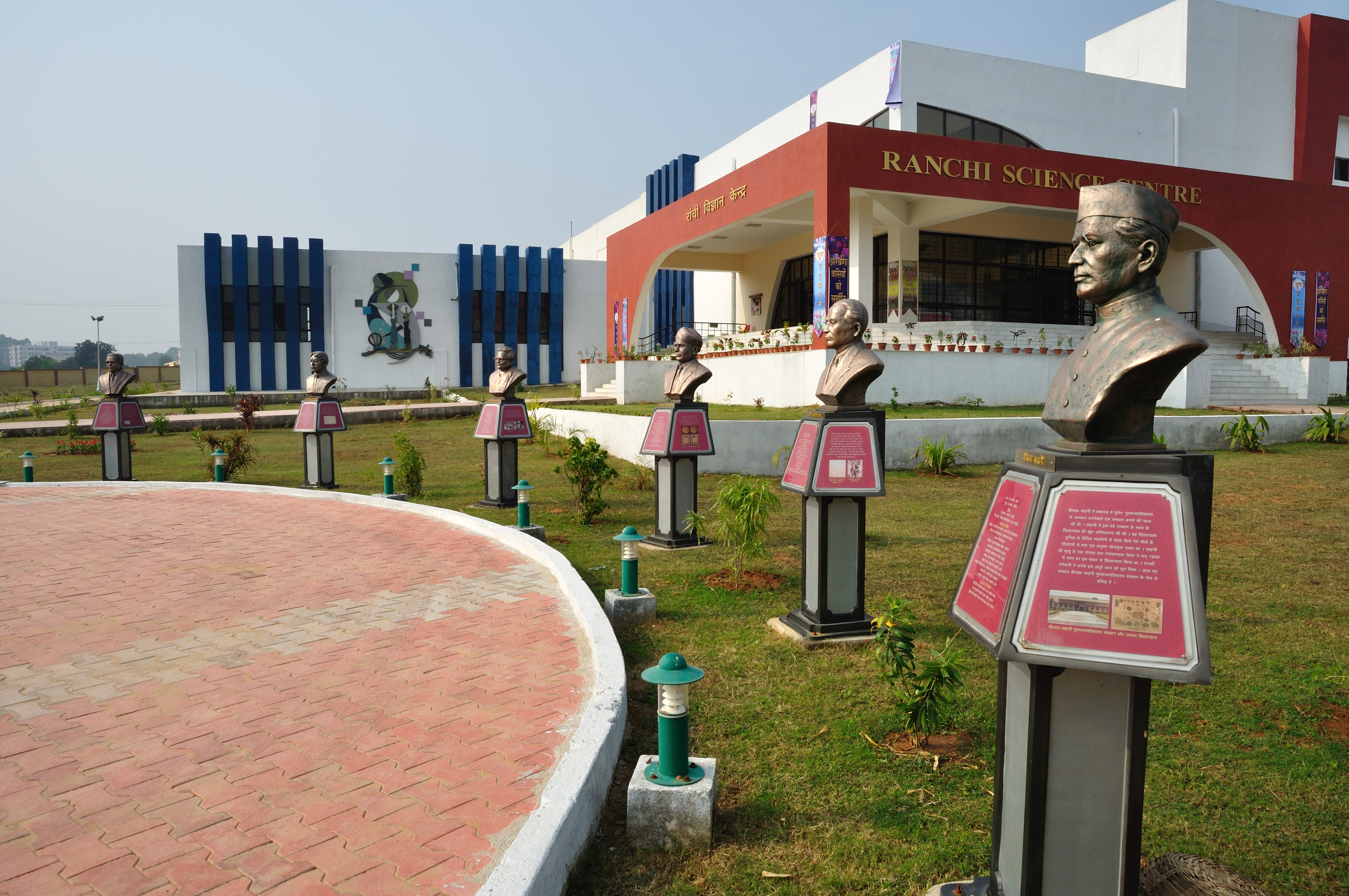
- Ranchi Lake Jagannath temple Suspension bridge in Gonda Hill City view from hill Roman Cathedral NIAMT office in Hatia Khelgaon sports complex Kanke Dam Ranchi Science Centre
- Nickname: City of Waterfalls
- Location in Jharkhand Ranchi (India)
- Coordinates: 23.36°N 85.33°E
- Country: India
- State: Jharkhand
- District: Ranchi
- Established: 1833 CE

Government
  - Type: Municipal corporation
  - Body: Ranchi Municipal Corporation
  - MP: Sanjay Seth, BJP
  - MLAs: C.P. Singh, BJP (Ranchi Sadar); Navin Jaiswal, BJP (Hatia); Suresh Kumar Baitha, INC (Kanke)
  - Mayor: Asha Lakra (BJP)
  - District Magistrate and Collector: Manjunath Bhajantri, (IAS)
  - Senior Superintendent of Police: Rakesh Ranjan, (IPS)

Area
  - Metropolis: 175.12 km^{2} (67.61 sq mi)
  - Metro: 652.02 km^{2} (251.75 sq mi)
- Elevation: 651 m (2,136 ft)

Population (2011)
  - Metropolis: 1,073,427
  - Rank: 38th
  - Density: 6,129.7/km^{2} (15,876/sq mi)
  - Metro: 1,456,528
- Demonym: Ranchiite/Ranchiwasi

Languages
  - Official: Hindi, English
  - Regional: Nagpuri
- Time zone: UTC+5:30 (IST)
- PIN: 834001(83 xxxx)
- Telephone code: 0651
- Vehicle registration: JH-01
- Sex ratio(per 1000 male): 950
- Literacy: 87.37%
- Domestic Airport: Birsa Munda Airport
- Website: ranchi.nic.in ranchimunicipal.com

Ranchi (Hindi: rāñcī, pronounced [ˈɾaːɲt͡ɕiː]) is the capital city and also the largest district by population of the Indian state of Jharkhand. Ranchi was the centre of the Jharkhand movement, which called for a separate state for the tribal regions of South Bihar, northern Odisha, western West Bengal and the eastern area of what is present-day Chhattisgarh. The Jharkhand state was formed on 15 November 2000 by carving out the Bihar divisions of Chota Nagpur and Santhal Parganas. Ranchi is being developed as a Smart City because it was selected as one of the hundred Indian cities to be developed as a smart city under PM Narendra Modi's flagship Smart Cities Mission.

Ranchi is also one of the oldest cities in Jharkhand. Jagannath Temple and Ratu Palace are some sights which witnessed the history of Ranchi. Ranchi is also nicknamed the City of Waterfalls.

Ranchi is rapidly growing its economy, and certain parks, special economic zones and industrial areas are being developed. Of late, new sectors and modern areas have been built for the city's development.

== Etymology ==
According to one popular tale, Thomas Wilkinson, a British captain, choose Archi (an Oraon tribal village) as headquarters. Archi means bamboo forest in local Nagpuri dialect. The British inadvertently named Archi as "Ranchi". Captain Wilkinson renamed Kishunpur village as Rachi. Up to 1927, the place was known as Rachi.

In his book The Mundas and Their Country, anthropologist Sarat Chandra Roy writes that the name of the city is derived from the Mundari word aranchi, referring to a short stick used in driving cattle, whereas others have opined that aranchi refers to bi-weekly market.

According to another local story, Ranchi's name comes from a local bird named rici that was found mostly in the Pahari Mandir premises. Rici is the name for the black kite (Milvus migrans) in the Mundari language, the modern-day landmark of Ranchi city, the Pahari Mandir, is also known as Rici Buru (रिचि बुरु) — the hill of the kites — and the city originated on the foothills of Rici Buru with the construction of Bada Talab by Commissioner Thomas Wilkinson at the same site.

== History ==
The earliest evidence of use of several iron slag, pot sheds, iron tools found in Chota Nagpur region around 1400 BCE. Magadha Empire exercised indirect control over the territory, which lasted until the reign of the Ashoka. Armies of Samudra Gupta passed through the region on their expedition to the Deccan. In the 4th century CE, Nagvanshi king Raja Pratap Rai chose Chutia as his capital which is now a place in Ranchi. Few ruins of Chutia trace back to the 2nd century CE. With the expansion of the Mughal Empire, the sovereign status of the Nagvanshi dynasty was technically affected, but they continued to rule and administer independently. Thakur Ani Nath Shahdeo made Satranji as capital of Barkagarh estate near Subarnarekha river. He built Jagannath Temple in 1691.

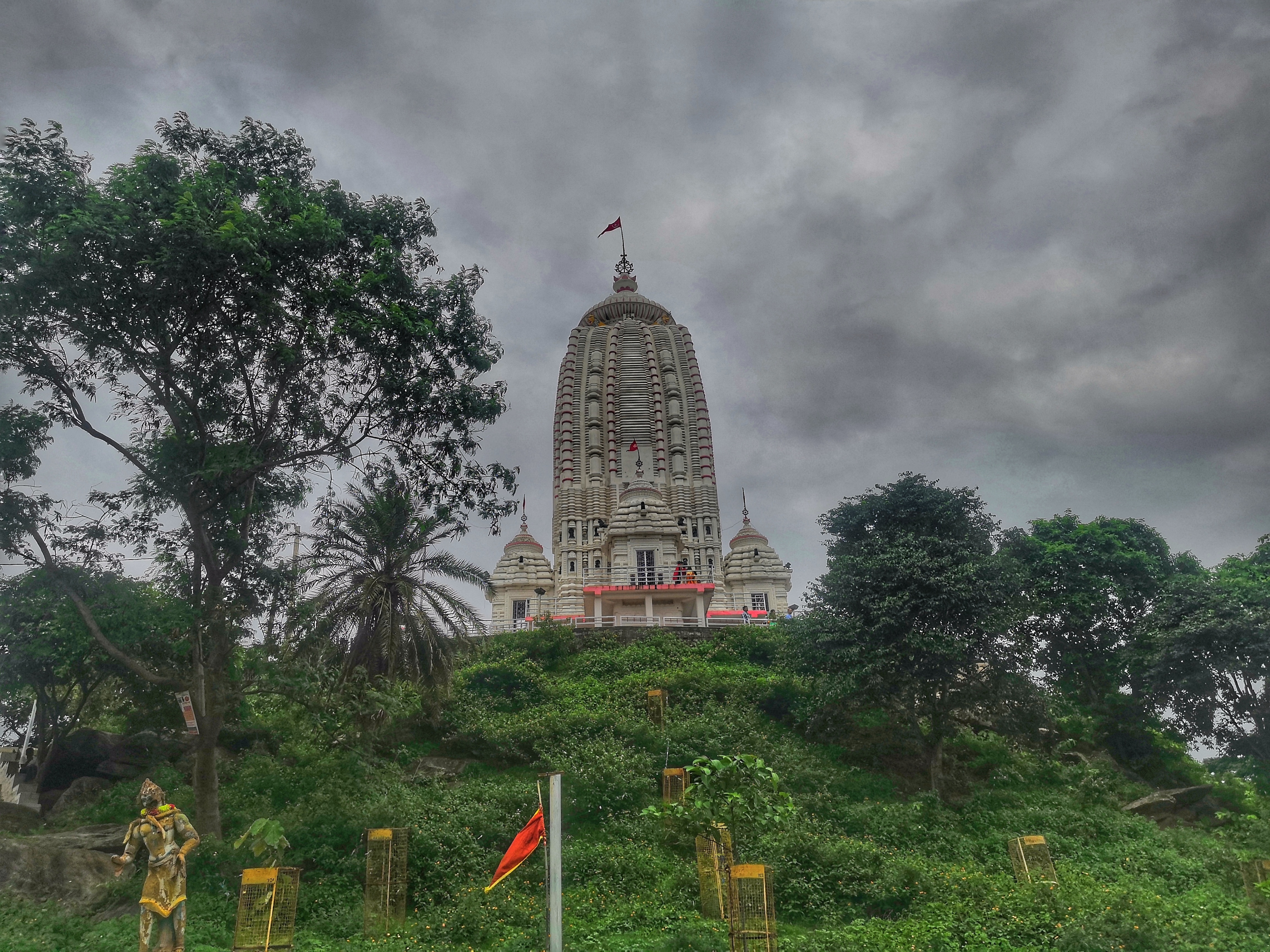
Jagannath Temple, Ranchi

After the Battle of Buxar, Nagvanshi became a vassal of the East India Company. The British reduced Nagvanshi rulers to Jamindar in 1817 due to rebellion of Jagirdars under Nagvanshi against tax imposition by East India Company and directly ruled Chotanagpur. In 1833, Captain Wilkinson established headquarter of the South-West Frontier agency in Lohardaga but in 1843 they moved the headquarters to the village of Kishunpur, which he renamed into Ranchi after the hamlet located at the foot of the Hill. In 1855, Thakur Vishwanath Shahdeo declared independence from British rule. British attacked Satranji but he defeated British forces. He ruled independently for two years. In the Indian Rebellion of 1857, Thakur Vishwanath Shahdeo led soldiers of Ramgarh Battalion with Madhav Singh who was Jamadar of Ramgarh Battalion. Pandey Ganpat Rai, Tikait Umrao Singh and Sheikh Bhikhari also joined the rebellion. They attacked the British in Ranchi and compelled to flee them. But later they were defeated by East India company forces in Chatra and in Pithuriya with the help of the king of Pithuriya, Jagatpal Singh and hanged. British made Ranchi as municipality in 1869. Ranchi was first termed as a town in the census of 1872, when entire Ranchi thhana has 116,426 inhabitants. Nagvanshi shifted their capital to Ratu from Palkot in 1870. Udai Pratap Nath Shah Deo built Ratu Palace in Ratu in 1900. He donated large tracts of land to build the infrastructure of the city. Freedom fighter Birsa Munda died in the Ranchi jail on 9 June 1900. In 1912, Jyotirindranath Tagore, the eldest brother of Rabindranath Tagore, settled in Ranchi. Tagore Hill, where his house was located, has been named after him in remembrance. The last ruler of the Nagvanshi dynasty was Lal Chintamani Sharan Nath Shahdeo (1931–2014).

After independence, Ranchi saw significant increase in its population. Its population rate of growth was 3.5% in 1901 to 1941, which increased to 14% in 1951–1971. This was because of increased industrial and educational institutions being set up, as well as the arrival of post-partition refugees. Ranchi became an 'administrative-cum-industrial' town in 1958 when Heavy Engineering Corporation was set up. The succeeding years saw Ranchi becoming the headquarters for the Steel Authority of India Ltd and Central Coalfields Ltd. The city remained the summer capital of Bihar till the creation of Jharkhand in November 2000, when Ranchi became the capital of the new state.

== Geography ==
Ranchi lies at 23°22′N 85°20′E near the Tropic of Cancer. The city covers an area of 175 km^{2} (68 sq mi) and its average elevation is 651 m above sea level. Ranchi is located in the southern part of the Chota Nagpur Plateau, which is the eastern section of the Deccan plateau.

Ranchi has a hilly topography and its dense tropical forests a combination that produces a relatively moderate climate compared to the rest of the state. However, due to the uncontrolled deforestation and development of the city, the average temperature has increased.

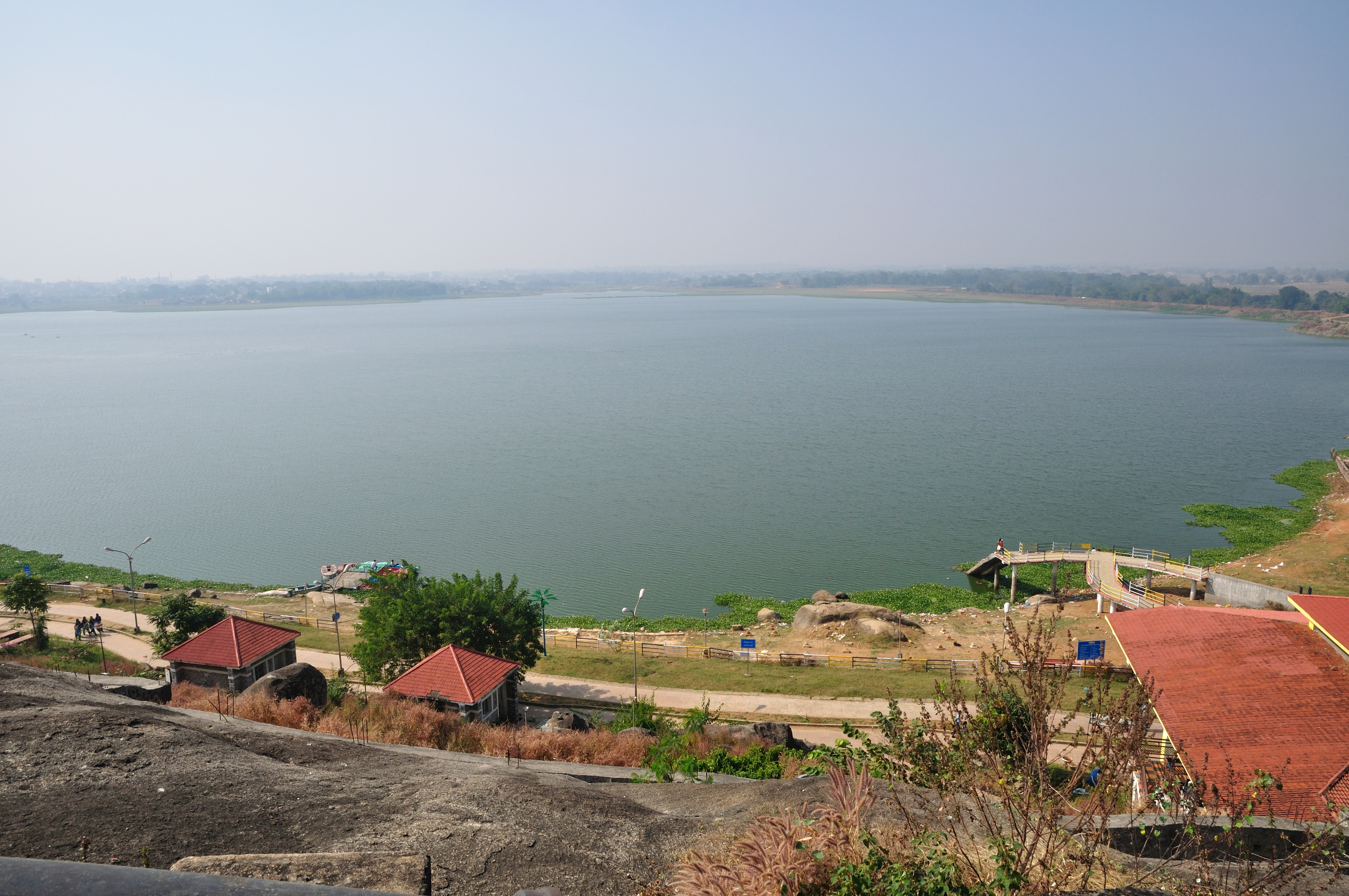
Kanke Dam

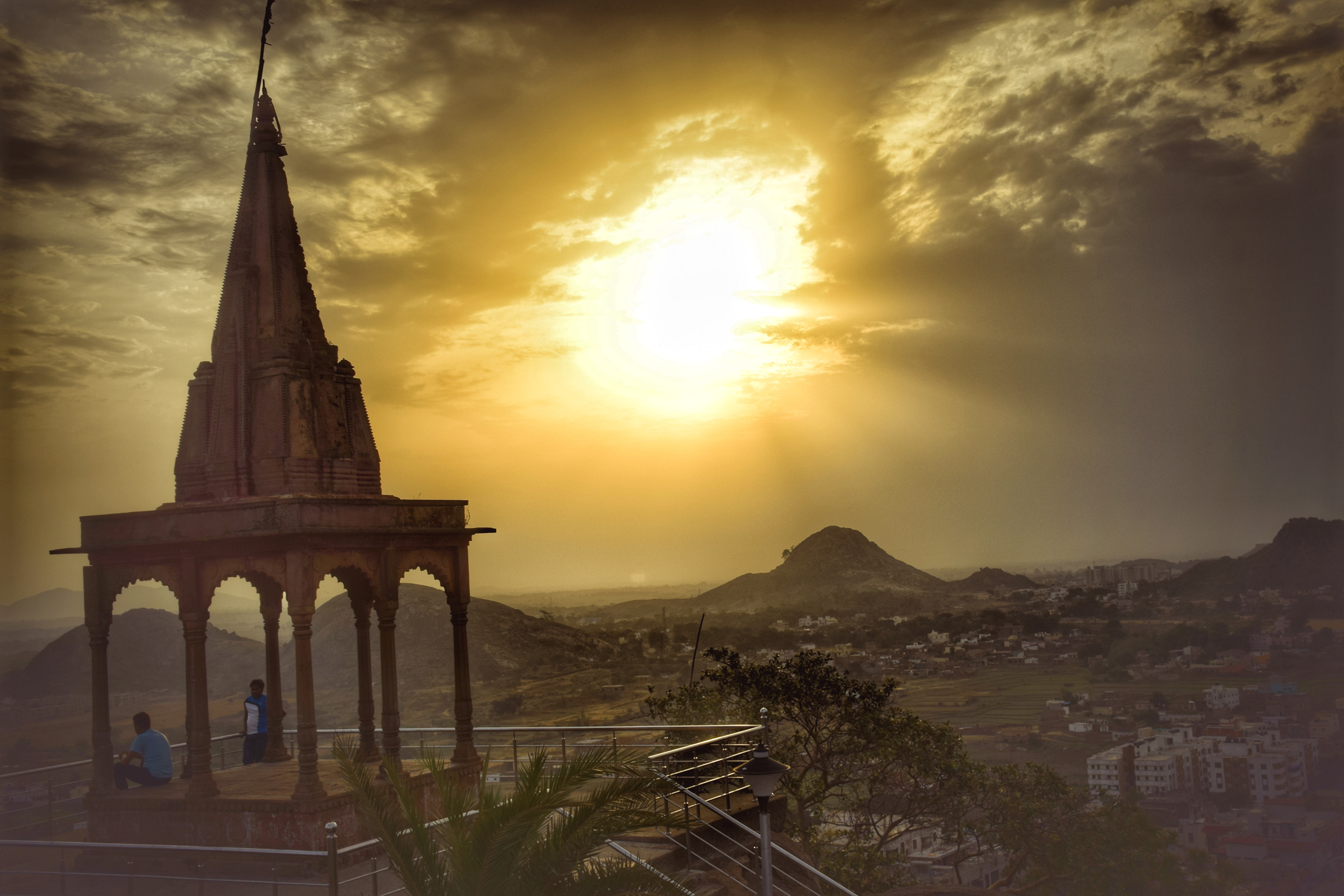
Tagore Hill

=== Climate ===
Although Ranchi has a humid subtropical climate (Köppen Climate Classification: Cwa), its location and the forests surrounding it combine to produce the unusually pleasant climate for which it is known. Summer temperatures range from 20 to 42 °C, winter temperatures from 0 to 25 °C. December and January are the coolest months, with temperatures dipping to the freezing point in some areas (Kanke). The annual rainfall is about 1,430 mm (56.34 inches). From June to September the rainfall is about 1,100 mm.

Climate data for Ranchi (1991–2020, extremes 1951–2020)
Month	Jan	Feb	Mar	Apr	May	Jun	Jul	Aug	Sep	Oct	Nov	Dec	Year
Record high °C (°F)	31.6 (88.9)	35.5 (95.9)	39.0 (102.2)	43.4 (110.1)	43.2 (109.8)	43.3 (109.9)	38.0 (100.4)	34.6 (94.3)	34.5 (94.1)	35.2 (95.4)	32.0 (89.6)	30.6 (87.1)	43.4 (110.1)
Mean daily maximum °C (°F)	24.0 (75.2)	27.0 (80.6)	31.5 (88.7)	35.8 (96.4)	36.9 (98.4)	33.9 (93.0)	29.9 (85.8)	29.6 (85.3)	29.8 (85.6)	29.1 (84.4)	27.1 (80.8)	24.3 (75.7)	29.9 (85.8)
Mean daily minimum °C (°F)	9.4 (48.9)	12.7 (54.9)	16.9 (62.4)	21.3 (70.3)	23.4 (74.1)	23.7 (74.7)	22.8 (73.0)	22.6 (72.7)	22.0 (71.6)	18.8 (65.8)	13.8 (56.8)	9.9 (49.8)	18.1 (64.6)
Record low °C (°F)	1.0 (33.8)	3.5 (38.3)	8.6 (47.5)	13.6 (56.5)	16.0 (60.8)	18.4 (65.1)	19.2 (66.6)	19.0 (66.2)	17.2 (63.0)	11.5 (52.7)	7.0 (44.6)	0.6 (33.1)	0.6 (33.1)
Average rainfall mm (inches)	17.7 (0.70)	19.3 (0.76)	28.1 (1.11)	24.9 (0.98)	59.0 (2.32)	246.1 (9.69)	331.3 (13.04)	320.9 (12.63)	247.2 (9.73)	91.9 (3.62)	7.5 (0.30)	11.0 (0.43)	1,404.8 (55.31)
Average rainy days	1.7	1.8	2.4	2.4	4.4	10.9	15.9	16.2	12.1	4.5	0.7	0.8	73.7
Average relative humidity (%) (at 17:30 IST)	47	39	31	28	39	64	81	82	79	67	56	50	55
Source: India Meteorological Department

Ranchi has been ranked 32nd best “National Clean Air City” (under Category 1 >10L Population cities) in India.

== Demographics ==
=== Population ===
Historical population
Year	Pop.	±%
1872	12,086	—
1881	18,443	+52.6%
1891	20,306	+10.1%
1901	25,970	+27.9%
1911	32,994	+27.0%
1921	39,628	+20.1%
1931	50,517	+27.5%
1941	62,562	+23.8%
1951	106,849	+70.8%
1961	140,253	+31.3%
1971	255,551	+82.2%
1981	489,626	+91.6%
1991	599,306	+22.4%
2001	847,093	+41.3%
2011	1,073,427	+26.7%
Source: Census of India

As of 2011 India census, Ranchi Municipal Corporation has a population of 1,073,427, The urban agglomeration had a population of 14,56,528 making it the 32nd most populous urban agglomeration in India. Males constitute 52.1% of the population and females 47.9%. Ranchi has an average literacy rate of 87.68%.

The city witnessed a sudden surge in population after the creation of the new state of Jharkhand in 2000. Owing to the rising employment opportunities and opening of numerous regional and state level offices, banks and FMCG companies, the city witnessed a rapid influx of employment seeking migrants. As per a study done by ASSOCHAM in late 2010, Ranchi was one of the highest employment generating Tier-III cities in India with a share of 16.8%, followed by Mangalore and Mysore.

=== Language ===
Languages spoken in Ranchi city (2011)
1. Hindi (56.3%)
2. Urdu (12.2%)
3. Nagpuri (10.2%)
4. Bhojpuri (4.41%)
5. Bengali (3.49%)
6. Kurukh (3.00%)
7. Mundari (2.32%)
8. Magahi (2.17%)
9. Maithili (1.56%)
10. Others (4.38%)

Hindi is the lingua franca in Ranchi. Nagpuri is regional language of the region. Hindi is spoken by 799,133, Urdu by 130,457, Bengali by 37,450, Kurukh by 24,762 people, Mundari by 24,858 and Maithili by 16,746 people.

=== Religion ===
Religion in Ranchi City (2011)
Religion	Percent
Hinduism	64.31%
Islam	16.42%
ORP	9.72%
Christianity	8.52%
Other or not stated	1.03%
*ORP mostly adherents of Sarnaism

Hinduism is the prominent religion of Ranchi followed by 64.31% of the population. Islam is the second most followed religion in the city by 16.42% of the people. Minorities are Christians 8.52%, Sikhs 0.39%, Jains 0.22%, Buddhists 0.06%, those that did not state a religion are 0.35%, and tribal religion– primarily the Sarnaists are 9.72%.

== Governance and politics ==
=== Civic administration ===
The municipal corporation covers an area of 175 km^{2} (68 sq mi) and is divided into 55 administrative wards, each represented by an elected corporator.

At the time of the creation of the state of Jharkhand in 2000, the Bihar Municipal Act, 1922 was adapted as the Jharkhand Municipal Act, 2000 to govern all ULBs in the new state. Ranchi Municipal Corporation was governed by its own municipal act, the Ranchi Municipal Corporation Act, 2001. With the enactment of the Jharkhand Municipal Act 2011, these two ceased to be in effect and the 2011 became the only governing legislature for all city governments in Jharkhand.

Under section 26 of the Jharkhand Municipal Act, 2011, the positions of mayor and deputy mayor are elected directly i.e. the position holders are voted in by the people themselves. The last municipal election was in 2018 with a voter turnout of 49.3%, up from 38% in the last election in 2013. Asha Lakra and Sanjiv Vijayawargia – both from the Bharatiya Janta Party – won the mayoral and deputy mayoral seats. The 2018 municipal election was the first time the mayoral and deputy mayoral candidates in Jharkhand could use political party symbols, while the candidates for councilor seats continued to use symbols allotted to them by the Jharkhand State Election Commission. The next municipal election will take place in 2023.

The Jharkhand Municipal Act, 2011 mandates the establishment of ward committees for each ward in the municipality. Though ward committees have been formed in Ranchi, they are not active.

=== Lok Sabha and Vidhan Sabha Constituencies ===
Ranchi city is part of the Ranchi Lok Sabha Constituency. Sanjay Seth won the seat in the 2019 General Election and represents this constituency at the Lok Sabha as a Member of Parliament. Ranchi is part of the Ranchi Vidhan Sabha Constituency and the representative Member of Legislative Assembly at the Jharkhand Vidhan Sabha is Chandreshwar Prasad Singh. Singh has held the post since 2000, with the last Jharkhand Vidhan Sabha election being in 2019. Both politicians belong to the Bharatiya Janata Party.

== Public utilities ==
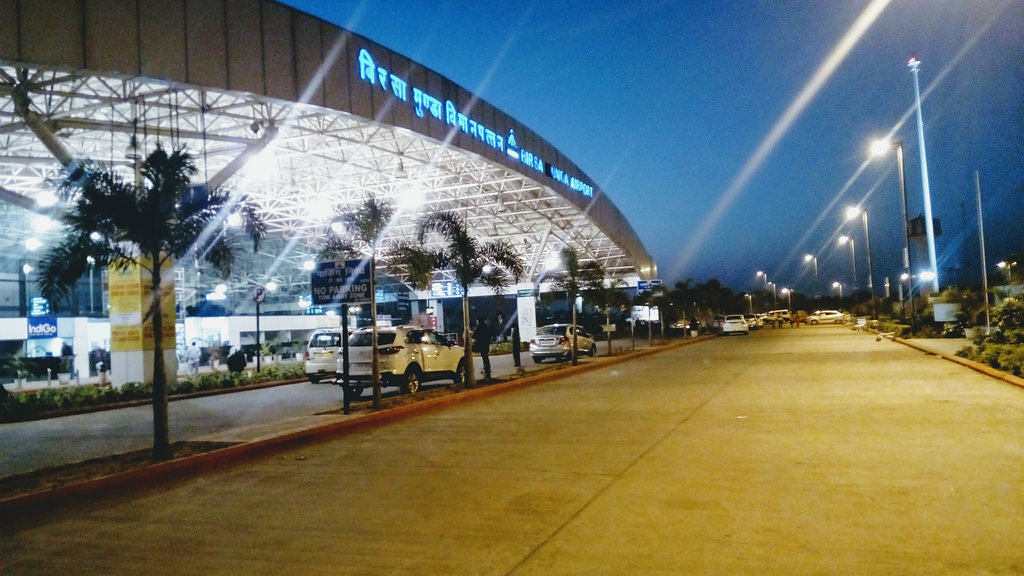
Birsa Munda Airport

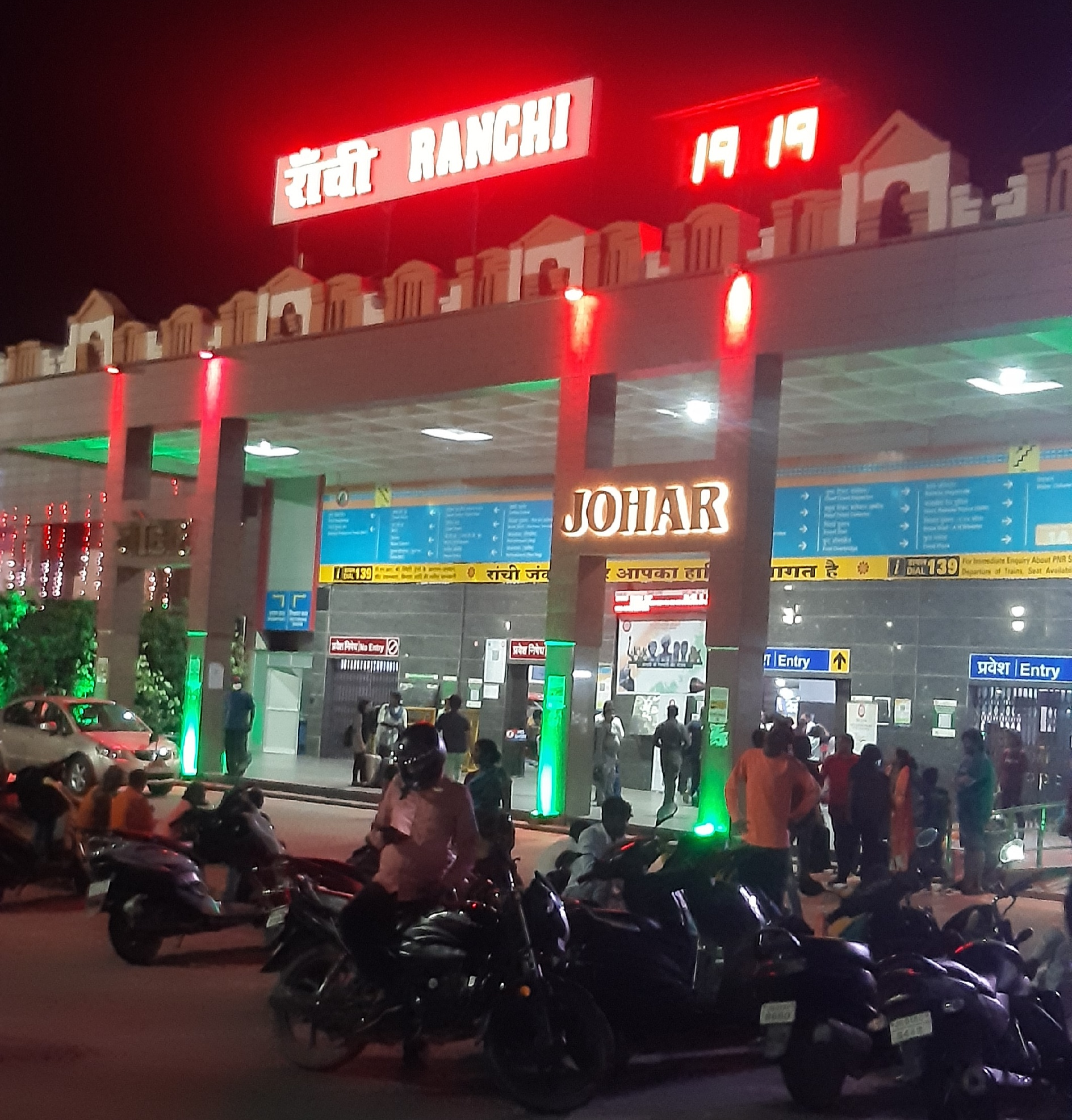
Ranchi Junction railway station

The various infrastructure and civic services demands of the city are met by different entities, including Ranchi Municipal Corporation, state government departments, and parastatal organisations. The Ranchi Master Plan 2037 was created by a private consultant firm under the clientship of the Ranchi Municipal Corporation, Urban Development and Housing Department, and Ranchi Regional Development Authority. Roads in Ranchi are developed and maintained by the municipal corporation, Jharkhand Government, Ranchi Regional Development Authority, and National Highways Authority of India. The Water Supply Section of the municipal corporation is responsible for issuing water connections, maintaining hand pumps in wards, collecting water usage charges and fines, whereas the state government Drinking Water Supply and Sewerage Department supplies the water. Ranchi is served by Dhurwa Dam. The Health Department of the corporation is responsible for the Solid Waste Management of the city. RMC operates buses in the city and has outsourced this to a private agency.

== Transport ==
- Airways - Birsa Munda Airport is the busiest airport in the state which connects direct flights from major cities of india like New Delhi, Mumbai, Kolkata, Hyderabad, Chennai, Bengaluru, Lucknow, Pune and many more cities also a new terminal of airport is purposed.
- Railways - Ranchi has four railway stations which connects direct trains from ranchi to major capital cities of india which includes New Delhi, Mumbai, Kolkata, Chennai, Bengaluru, Hyderabad, Patna, and major of the cities of india. Their Names are 1. Ranchi railway station 2. Hatia railway station 3. Muri Junction railway station 4. Tatisilwai railway station.
- Roadways - Ranchi is well connected with all the major cities of india as and its neighbour states with National Highways Authority of India all districts of Jharkhand is well connected through road network.
- Buses - There are two bus terminals Khadgarah Bus Station and Railway Bus Terminal majority of buses operate from these terminals and several bus stops are built within the city.

== Economy ==
Ranchi is one of the major industrial cities of Eastern India and located in the region called 'Ruhr of India' (Chota Nagpur) making it an ideal place for mineral based industries. Ranchi has presence of many well-known government and private organisations in the vicinity of city. SAIL-R&D, MECON.Ltd, Garden Reach Shipbuilders & Engineers (Marine Diesel Engine Project), Central Coalfields, CMPDI.Ltd, Subarnarekha Hydel Project (JSEB), Usha Martin.Ltd (Wire Rope Division), DVC, STPI-Ranchi, Heavy Engineering Corp., Palriwal Industries, Pensol India, Waxpol Industries, Jharkhand Mega Food Park etc. are the prominent industries here.

The Federation of Jharkhand Chamber of Commerce & Industries (FJCCI), ASSOCHAM, MSME-DI and JIADA are major apex industrial bodies present here. JIADA consists many industrial areas in Ranchi, e.g. – Kokar, Tatisilwai, Namkum etc. are among them.

As per a study done by ASSOCHAM in late 2010, Ranchi was the highest employment generating Tier-III cities in India followed by Mangalore and Mysore. MECON Ltd Company has its headquarters in Ranchi at Ashok Nagar. Jharkhand Industrial Area Development Association has its office in Namkum. Central Coalfields also has its headquarters in Ranchi.

Ranchi houses a number of companies. Along with Jamshedpur, Dhanbad, Bokaro and Giridih it is one of the industrial hubs of the city. Here are the following companies which are based in Ranchi and also headquartered in Ranchi itself:Mecon limited, Central Coalfields, Heavy Engineering Corporation, Central Mine Planning and Design Institute, Jharkhand Rajya Gramin Bank and Dzinex Technology.

The main and major businesses here are located in Lalpur, Hindpiri, Lower Bazaar, Upper Bazaar and Doranda.

STPI Ranchi has set up its branch at Namkum, Ranchi. It is an IT Park, which houses many IT companies. More IT parks have been planned by the Government of Jharkhand. OFFCO Park is another IT Park here.

Lalpur, Doranda and Hindpiri are the business districts and financial districts in the city and the state. This place houses several shopping malls. Whole of Ranchi has several shopping malls which include: Nucleus Mall, Mall E Decor, JD Hi-Street Mall, Ranchi Central Mall, Laxmi Tower, Mall of Ranchi, City Center (Centre) Mall, Big Mall, Spring City Mall, Arakshan Shopping Mall, Shelter Mall, Ranchi Green City, Artic Mall, City Center or City Centre, City Mall and Galaxia Mall.

There are many other upcoming shopping malls and commercial projects

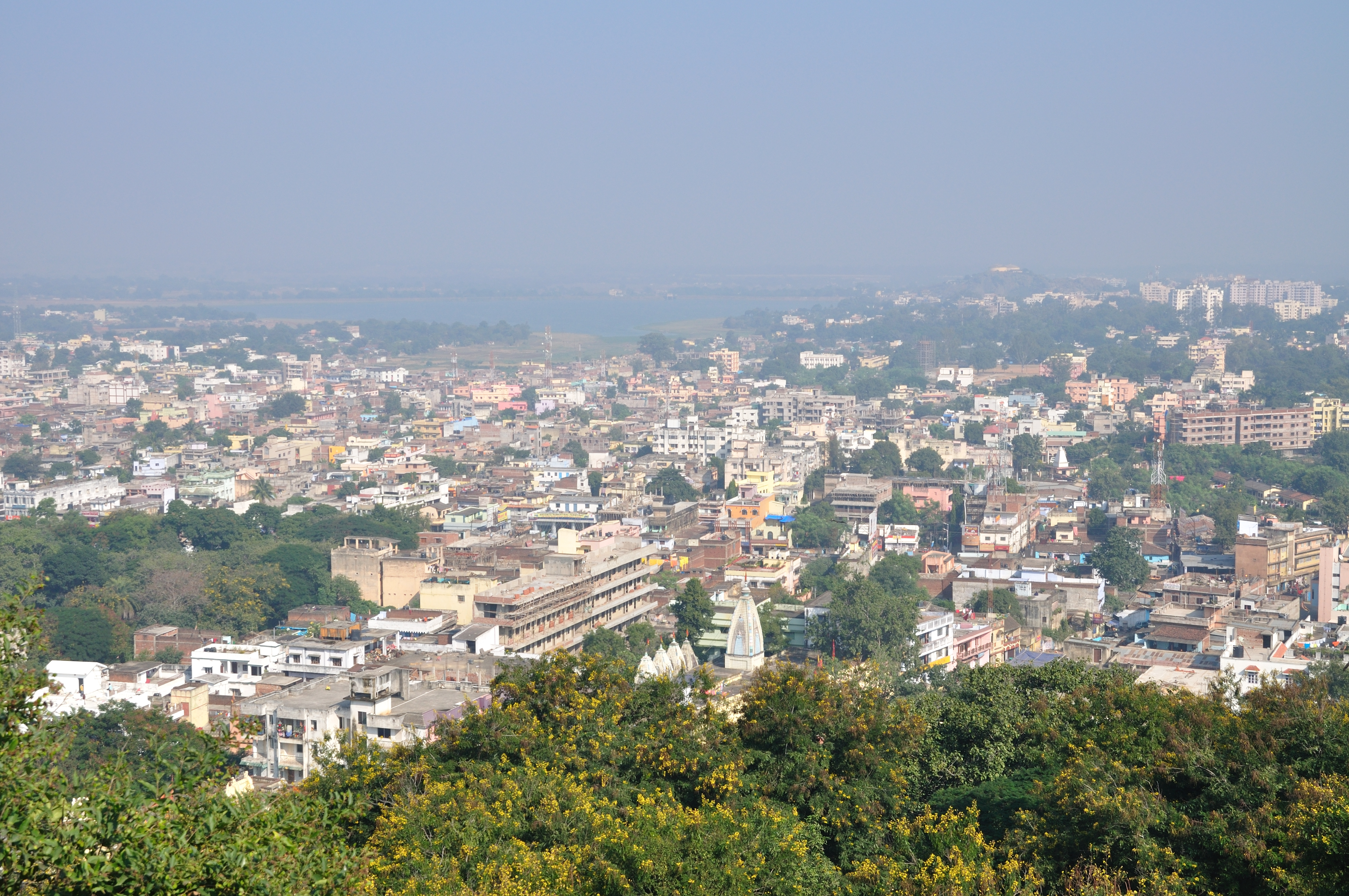
Lalpur - Central business district

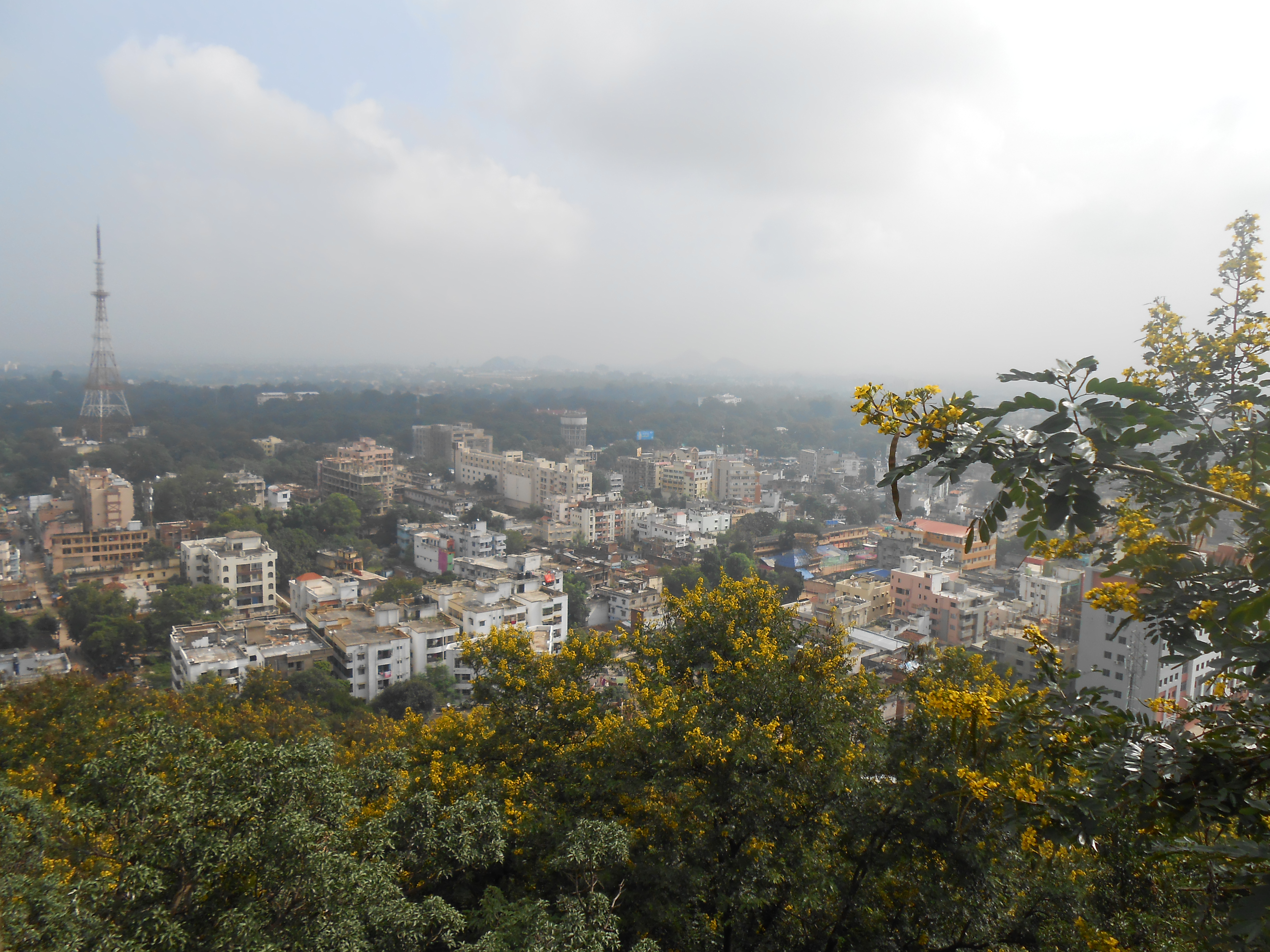
Central of Ranchi is the commercial, historical, cultural, financial and economic district hub of the city Ranchi

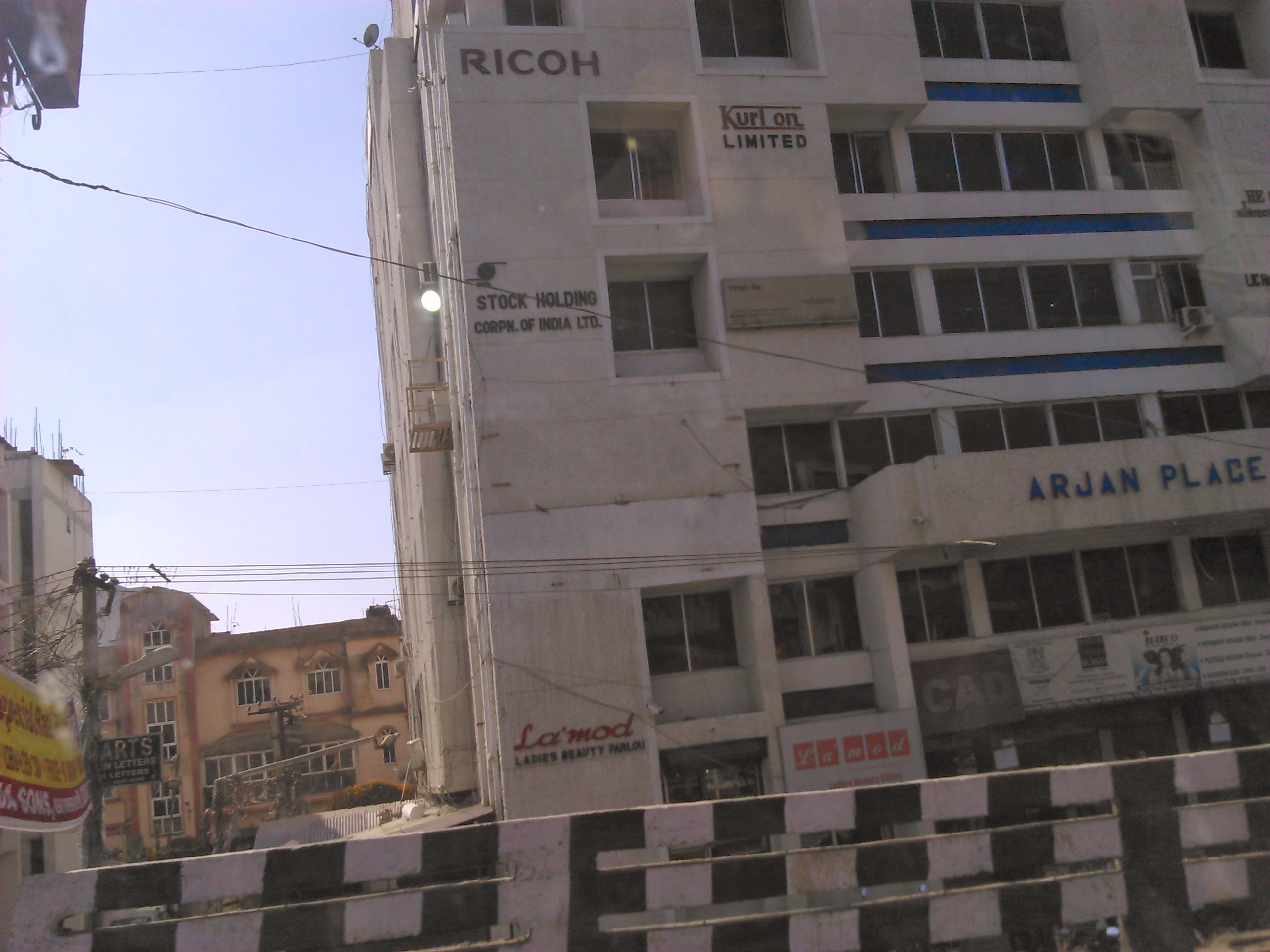
Arjan Place at Hindpiri, Ranchi houses several companies including the Stock Holding Corporation of India Limited and Ricoh

== Education ==
=== Universities and Institutes ===
- Amity University, Jharkhand
- Birla Institute of Technology, Mesra
- Birsa Agricultural University
- Central Institute of Psychiatry Ranchi
- Central University of Jharkhand
- Dr. Shyama Prasad Mukherjee University
- ICFAI University, Jharkhand
- Indian Institute of Information Technology, Ranchi
- Indian Institute of Management Ranchi
- Jharkhand Raksha Shakti University
- Jharkhand State Open University
- Jharkhand University of Technology
- National Institute of Advanced Manufacturing Technology
- National University of Study and Research in Law
- Rajendra Institute of Medical Sciences
- Ranchi University
- Sarala Birla University
- Usha Martin University

=== Organizations ===
- Association for Parivartan of Nation

== Health ==
- Sadar Medical College and Hospital
- Rajendra Institute of Medical Sciences
- Central Institute of Psychiatry, Kanke
- Ranchi Institute of Neuropsychiatry and Allied Sciences

== Sports ==
Ranchi is a center for numerous sports activities, including cricket, hockey, football, and many others. The 34th National Games were successfully held in Ranchi in February 2011. An International Cricket stadium with an indoor stadium and a practice ground has been constructed. So far, this stadium has hosted three One day International matches and one T20 International match. Apart from that, this stadium has hosted two IPL 6 matches for Kolkata Knight Riders, three champions league 2013 matches and Celebrity Cricket League matches for Bhojpuri Dabanggs. A tennis academy, which was inaugurated by Sania Mirza and Shoaib Malik, also runs beside the cricket stadium. Former Indian Cricket Team Captain M.S. Dhoni lives in Ranchi. The Ranchi franchise for Hockey India League was bought by Patel-Uniexcel Group and the team named the Ranchi Rhinos.

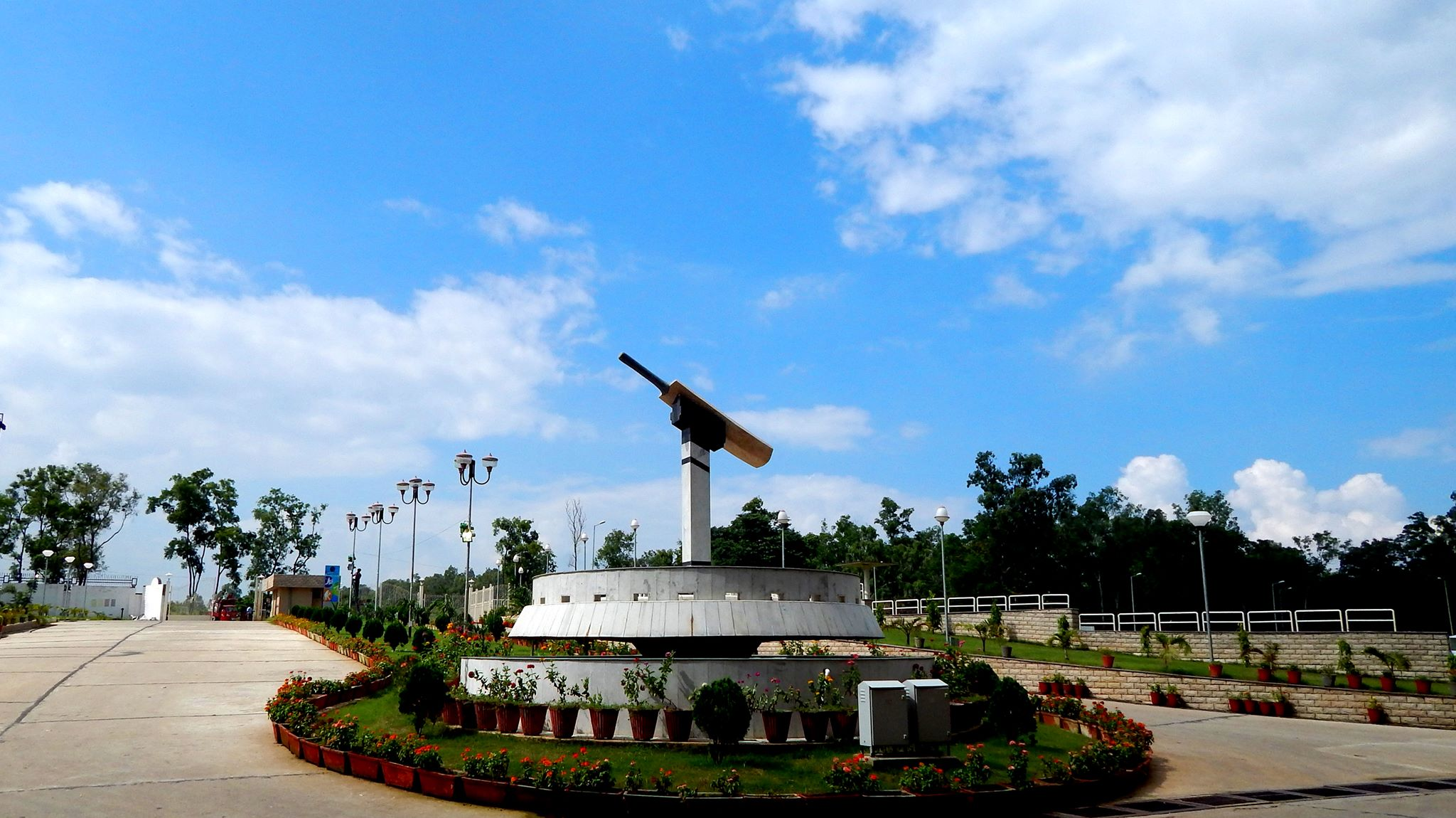
JSCA Cricket Stadium Entrance

=== Sports teams ===
- Ranchi Rays (earlier Ranchi Rhinos)

=== Stadiums in Ranchi ===
- Jaipal Singh Stadium
- JSCA International Cricket Stadium
- Birsa Munda Hockey Stadium
- Birsa Munda Athletics Stadium
- Birsa Munda Football Stadium
- Mega Sports Complex

== Points of Interest ==
Ranchi
- Bhagwan Birsa Biological Park
- Dassam Falls
- Getalsud Dam(also known as Rukka Dam; built in 1971)
- Gossner Evangelical Lutheran Church, the oldest church in eastern and northern India
- Harmu Housing Colony
- Hundru Falls
- Jagannath Temple, built by Thakur Ani Nath Shahdeo, Raja of Barkagarh Jagannathpur in 1691.
- Jonha Falls, also known as Gautamdhara (the place dedicated to Gautam Buddha)
- Kanke Dam, also known as Gonda Dam built in 1955
- Rock Garden, built along Kanke Dam
- Nakshatra Van
- Pahari Mandir, temple dedicated to Lord Shiva
- Patratu Valley
- Ranchi Science Centre
- Ratu Palace, capital of Nagvanshis of Chotanagpur.
- Sita Falls
- Ranchi State Museum, State Art museum
- St.Mary's Cathedral, one of oldest church of Ranchi built in 1847
- Tagore Hill (related to Jyotindranath Tagore, brother of Rabindranath Tagore)

== Notable people ==
=== Central Minister ===
- Subodh Kant Sahay, Former Minister Government of India

=== MP of Ranchi ===
- Sanjay Seth (Jharkhand politician), Current MP Ranchi, Minister of State For Defence Government of India
- Ram Tahal Choudhary, Ex-MP Ranchi
- Prashant Kumar Ghosh, Ex-MP Ranchi
- Ravindra Varma, Ex-MP Ranchi
- Subodh Kant Sahay, Former Minister Government of India
- C.P. Singh (Indian politician).

=== Other ===
- Rajesh Chauhan, former Indian cricketer, born in Ranchi
- Deeba, Pakistani actress
- MS Dhoni, former captain of Indian Cricket Team
- Carl Haeberlin, German physician, born in Ranchi
- Madhu Mansuri Hasmukh, folk singer
- Rajesh Jais, actor
- Komal Jha, actress
- Anjana Om Kashyap, journalist and news presenter
- Neelu Kohli, actress
- Deepika Kumari, professional archer
- Supriya Kumari, actress
- Peter Mansfield, British journalist and historian, was born in Ranchi
- Pat Reid MBE MC, escapee from Colditz Castle, born in Ranchi
- Anushka Sen, actress
- Gopal Sharan Nath Shahdeo, Nagvanshi prince and MLA
- Lal Chintamani Sharan Nath Shahdeo, last Nagvanshi king
- Vishwanath Shahdeo, freedom fighter, born in Barkagarh, Ranchi
- Alisha Singh, dancer and choreographer

== See also ==
- Ranchi Metropolitan Region
- List of cities in Jharkhand
- 1967 Ranchi-Hatia riots
