= Tikait Umrao Singh =

South Asian king and freedom fighter

Raja of Bandhgawa
- Born: Khatanga, Ormanjhi, Ranchi (now Jharkhand)
- Died: 8 January 1858; Chutupalu Ghati, Ramgarh, British India

Tikait Umrao Singh was a king and freedom fighter. He was king of small kingdom Bandhgawa which is located in Ranchi district in Jharkhand. In Indian rebellion 1857, he and his brother Ghasi Singh played pivotal role in preventing East India Company force from occupying Ranchi.

He was born in Khatanga village of Ormanjhi block in Jharkhand. He prevented company force by cutting trees of Chutupalu ghati with his dewan Sheikh Bhikhari. British force hanged him in a banayan tree at Chutupalu Ghati, Ramgarh.
