= 2011 National Games of India =

Multi-sport event in Jharkhand, India

34th National Games of India
- 2011 National Games Logo By Dilip Kumar Toppo
- Host city: Ranchi, Jamshedpur, and Dhanbad
- Teams: 36
- Athletes: 8511
- Events: 444 in 33 sports
- Opening: 12 February 2011
- Closing: 26 February 2011
- Opened by: M. O. H. Farook (Governor of Jharkhand)
- Closed by: Suresh Kalmadi (Chairman of Indian Olympic Association)
- Athlete's Oath: Deepika Kumari
- Torch lighter: Sylvanus Dung Dung
- Main venue: Birsa Munda Athletics Stadium, Ranchi

The 2011 National Games of India, also known as the 34th National Games of India and informally as Jharkhand 2011, was the 34th edition of National Games of India, held from 12 February 2011 to 26 February 2011 in Ranchi, Jharkhand, India Jamshedpur Dhanbad.

Services (Services Sports Control Board – SSCB), which was a combined team of the Indian Armed Forces, retained the overall title with 70 gold medals. Services were presented with the Raja Bhalindra Singh Trophy for the champions team. The Maharashtra swimmer Virdhawal Khade who won 12 medals including 8 golds was adjudged the best male athlete while the Delhi swimmer Richa Mishra who won 16 medals including 11 golds was adjudged the best female athlete. The best state award was won by Manipur which won 48 gold medals to finish in second place overall.

== Opening ceremony ==
The opening ceremony was held at the Birsa Munda Athletics Stadium in Ranchi. The governor of Jharkhand, M. O. H. Farook had declared the Games open. Jharkhand chief minister Arjun Munda presided over the function. The games torch was lit by Indian men's hockey player Sylvanus Dung Dung. Deepika Kumari, double gold-winner at the Commonwealth Games took the oath on behalf of the athletes. A short film on folk hero Birsa Munda, arrival of mascot – the smiling deer 'Chhaua', fire dancers, a laser show highlighting five sporting icons of the state (hockey stars Jaipal Singh Munda, Samurai Tete, Sylvanus Dung Dung, archer Sanjeeva Singh and India cricket skipper MS Dhoni) were the main attractions of the opening ceremony. Popular fusion rock band- "Manthan", composed of students of IIT (ISM) Dhanbad opened the event and entertained the esteemed dignitaries. Bollywood stars Sameera Reddy, Vivek Oberoi and Amisha Patel performed in the ceremony along with singer Sukhwinder Singh.

== Mascot ==
Chhaua, the deer.

The mascot of the games is Chhaua, a deer in running motion holding the torch. Chhaua depicts the body of a human and head of a stag, symbolising both stillness and energy that characterise Jharkhand's tribal communities. Chhaua means "little boy" in the local language. The mascot of the games, Chhaua in famous dokra-art will be presented to all the players and officials by the games committee. The National Games Organising Committee (NGOC) had issued orders for the same to Jharcraft for manufacturing 14,000 mementoes that will be given to players and guests as a remembrance of their arrival in the State. During the opening ceremony of the games, the Games mascot 'Chhaua' – baby deer—made an aerial entry into the athletics complex and ran around the stadium with the torch with echoes of Vande Mataram.

== Participating teams ==
- Andhra Pradesh
- Arunachal Pradesh
- Assam
- Bihar
- Chhattisgarh
- Goa
- Gujarat
- Haryana
- Himachal Pradesh
- Jammu and Kashmir
- Jharkhand
- Karnataka
- Kerala
- Madhya Pradesh
- Maharashtra
- Manipur
- Meghalaya
- Mizoram
- Nagaland
- Odisha
- Punjab
- Rajasthan
- Sikkim
- Tamil Nadu
- Tripura
- Uttar Pradesh
- Uttarakhand
- West Bengal
- Andaman and Nicobar Islands
- Chandigarh
- Delhi
- Dadra and Nagar Haveli
- Daman and Diu
- Lakshadweep
- Puducherry
- Services

== Sports ==
There are a total of 444 gold medals in 35 events in the games. The events are:-

No:	Event	No: of participants	Gold medals
1	Athletics	858	44
2	Fencing	225	12
3	Karate	149	15
4	Swimming	332	40
5	Volleyball	214	2
6	Basketball	226	2
7	Wrestling	308	21
8	Hockey	330	2
9	Football	406	2
10	Rugby	121	1
11	Wushu	254	40
12	Badminton	132	6
13	Table tennis	95	7
14	Lawn Bowls	76	8
15	Judo	129	16
16	Taekwondo	144	16
17	Gymnastics	227	20
18	Handball	265	2
19	Kabaddi	251	2
20	Kho-Kho	220	2
21	Cycling	200	24
22	Shooting	565	33
23	Tennis	93	6
24	Boxing	303	20
25	Archery	306	12
26	Weightlifting	130	15
27	Equestrian	143	6
28	Netball	224	2
29	Sepak Takraw	285	4
30	Rowing	432	17
31	Kayaking & Canoeing	382	31
32	Triathlon	164	4
33	Squash	87	2
34	Diving	47	6
35	Water Polo	188	2
Total		8511	444

== Venues ==
The 35 events in the games are held in 3 cities – Ranchi, Jamshedpur and Dhanbad, in a total of 21 venues.

Venue	City	Capacity	Sports	Ref
Birsa Munda Athletics Stadium Mega Sports Complex	Ranchi	35,000	Athletics	
Sheikh Bhikhari Administrative Block	Ranchi	22,000	Karate, Fencing	
Veer Budhu Bhagat Aquatic Stadium	Ranchi	3,194	Aquatics	
Harivansh Tana Bhagat Indoor Stadium	Ranchi	4,000	Basketball, Volleyball, Wrestling	
Astroturf Hockey Stadium	Ranchi	5,000	Hockey	
Birsa Munda Football Stadium	Ranchi	40,000	Football, Rugby 7s	
Thakur Vishwanath Shahdeo Indoor Stadium	Ranchi	2,000	Badminton, Wushu, Table tennis	
RK Anand Lawn Bowl Greens	Ranchi	1,000	Judo, Lawn Bowls	
Ganpat Rai Indoor Stadium	Ranchi	2,000	Badminton, Taekwondo, Table tennis, Gymnastics, Handball	
Albert Ekka Stadium	Ranchi	Unknown	Kho kho, Kabaddi	
Sidhu Kanhu Velodrome Stadium	Ranchi	2,000	Cycling	
Tikait Umrao Shooting Range	Ranchi	2,000	Shooting	
Tennis Stadium	Ranchi	2,000	Tennis	
Keenan Stadium	Jamshedpur	n/a	Boxing	
JRD Tata Sports Complex	Jamshedpur	n/a	Football, Archery	
XLRI Ground	Jamshedpur	n/a	Weightlifting	
Gopal Maidan	Jamshedpur	n/a	Equestrian	
Indian School of Mines Ground	Dhanbad	n/a	Netball	
Indoor Stadium	Dhanbad	n/a	Sepak Takraw	
Maithon Dam	Dhanbad	n/a	Kayaking & Canoeing, Triathlon, Rowing	
ISM & Officer Club	Dhanbad	n/a	Squash	

== Medals tally ==
* Host nation ( Jharkhand)

Rank	State	Gold	Silver	Bronze	Total
1	Services	70	50	42	162
2	Manipur	48	37	33	118
3	Haryana	42	33	40	115
4	Maharashtra	41	44	47	132
5	Jharkhand*	33	26	37	96
6	Delhi	32	26	41	99
7	Kerala	30	29	28	87
8	Madhya Pradesh	25	32	46	103
9	Punjab	23	38	54	115
10	Uttar Pradesh	20	22	28	70
11	Karnataka	16	19	20	55
12	Tamil Nadu	14	12	27	53
13	Tripura	6	2	1	9
14	Andhra Pradesh	5	19	25	49
15	Assam	5	11	18	34
16	Goa	5	5	6	16
17	Odisha	5	4	3	12
18	West Bengal	4	10	21	35
19	Uttarakhand	4	4	5	13
20	Rajasthan	4	1	10	15
21	Chhattisgarh	4	1	2	7
22	Andaman and Nicobar Islands	3	2	2	7
23	Himachal Pradesh	2	0	5	7
24	Bihar	1	5	6	12
25	Meghalaya	1	3	2	6
26	Sikkim	1	2	1	4
27	Jammu and Kashmir	0	4	8	12
28	Gujarat	0	3	4	7
29	Arunachal Pradesh	0	1	10	11
30	Chandigarh	0	1	9	10
31	Mizoram	0	1	5	6
32	Nagaland	0	0	2	2
Totals (32 entries)		444	447	588	1,479

Source: Source: Official website

== Closing ceremony ==
The closing ceremony of the 34th National Games was held on 26 February 2011 at the Birsa Munda Athletic stadium in Ranchi, Jharkhand. The ceremony began with a monoplane performing aerobatics and showering coloured powder on the stadium. It was followed by an Indian Air Force helicopter showering flowers on the stadium, followed by the para-jump by 12 dare devils of the IAF, who jumped from a height of 4300 feet and anded in the middle of the stadium. The games was officially closed by Suresh Kalmadi, the chairman of the Indian Olympic Association (IOA). He ceremoniously handed over the Games flag to the Kerala officials. Kerala will host the 35th National Games in December 2012. The Jharkhand chief minister Arjun Munda was the chief guest of the event. The Union sports minister Ajay Maken was supposed to be the chief guest, withdrew from the function due to differences with Suresh Kalmadi. The cultural evening showcased the cultural heritage and folk dances from the participating states, especially Jharkhand, Punjab and Manipur and a team from Kerala displayed their local martial arts and art forms as a prelude of the next games. Bollywood actress Katrina Kaif and singer Shaan performed at the closing ceremony. A special song Vidai has been performed by the "folk artists and percussionists" which formed the "theme of the state's cultural show". There was also a paika dance to celebrate the success of the Games.

Preceded by 2007 National Games of India	National Games of India	Succeeded by 2015 National Games of India
