= Birsa Munda Athletics Stadium =

Stadium in Ranchi, Jharkhand, India

- Interactive map of Birsa Munda Athletics Stadium
- Full name: Birsa Munda Athletics Stadium
- Location: Ranchi, India
- Coordinates: 23.378°N 85.3875°E
- Owner: Government of Jharkhand
- Capacity: 35,000
- Surface: Grass
- Scoreboard: Yes

Construction
- Groundbreaking: 2006
- Opened: 2009
- Cost: ₹ 1.35 billion
- Architect: Arun Lamba Consultants

Tenants
- Jharkhand football team Jharkhand women's football team JSA League

Birsa Munda Athletics Stadium is a stadium in Ranchi, Jharkhand, India. It is used mostly for football matches and athletics. The stadium hosted the opening and closing ceremonies of the 2011 National Games of India. It has seating capacity of 35,000 spectators.

== Features ==
Birsa Munda Athletics Stadium was the inspiration behind the renovation of Jawaharlal Nehru Stadium, Delhi that hosted the opening and closing ceremonies of the 2010 Commonwealth Games. To host the athletics events, the main stadium occupies the 275 acres (111 ha) Mega Sports Complex. With its many elliptical pylons and ramps that lead to the upper tiers, it adds to the futuristic look of the area that also houses seven smaller stadiums.

The stadium's fire-, dust- and rust-proof roof is made of polytetrafluoroethylene (PTFE). Designed by Australian firm MakMax Australia, the 12,950 square metres (139,400 sq ft) roof material was imported from Japan for ₹ 80 million and took four months to instal. The stadium has two such roofs, one at the VVIP section and one at the press box.

Four towers of high-lux lights are installed for conducting sports events at night. As many as 12 double lifts have been fitted in the stadium. Four towers in the corners connect to middle and upper galleries. An air-conditioned enclosure inside houses a six-lane warm-up track of 80 meters. Doing away with cemented pillars, 62 elliptical pylon columns of 20 metres (66 ft) in height surround the stadium, which, from some angles, resemble a spaceship. 36 lounges can accommodate state contingents. Besides, there are 32 dormitories that can accommodate 1,000 people.
