= Barkagarh estate =

Barkagarh Raj
- 17th century–1858
- Status: Vassal of Chotanagpur Raj
- Capital: Satranji (now in Ranchi)
- Religion: Hinduism
- Government: Monarchy
- Thakur (Lord)
  - 17th century: Ani Nath Shahdeo (first)
  - c.1840-1858 CE: Vishwanath Shahdeo (last)
- Historical era: Modern Era
  - Established: 17th century
  - Battle of Chatra: 1858

The Barkagarh estate was a zamindari estate situated in modern-day Jharkhand, India, in erstwhile Lohardaga district (now in Ranchi). It was established by Ani Nath Shahdeo, the son of Nagvanshi king Ram Shah in 17th century. The capital of the estate was Satranji now located in south Ranchi.

Ani Nath Shahdeo had founded his capital at Satrangi on the bank of Subarnarekha river and built Jagannath temple in 1691.

== History ==
The Barkagarh estate was founded by Thakur Ani Nath Shahdeo, the son of Nagvanshi King Ram Shah in 17th century. He built the capital at Satranji near Subarnarekha river. The state consist of two pargana the Udaipur and Seiri with 113 villages. He built Jagannath temple in 1691. He also established a market which is now known as Hatia.

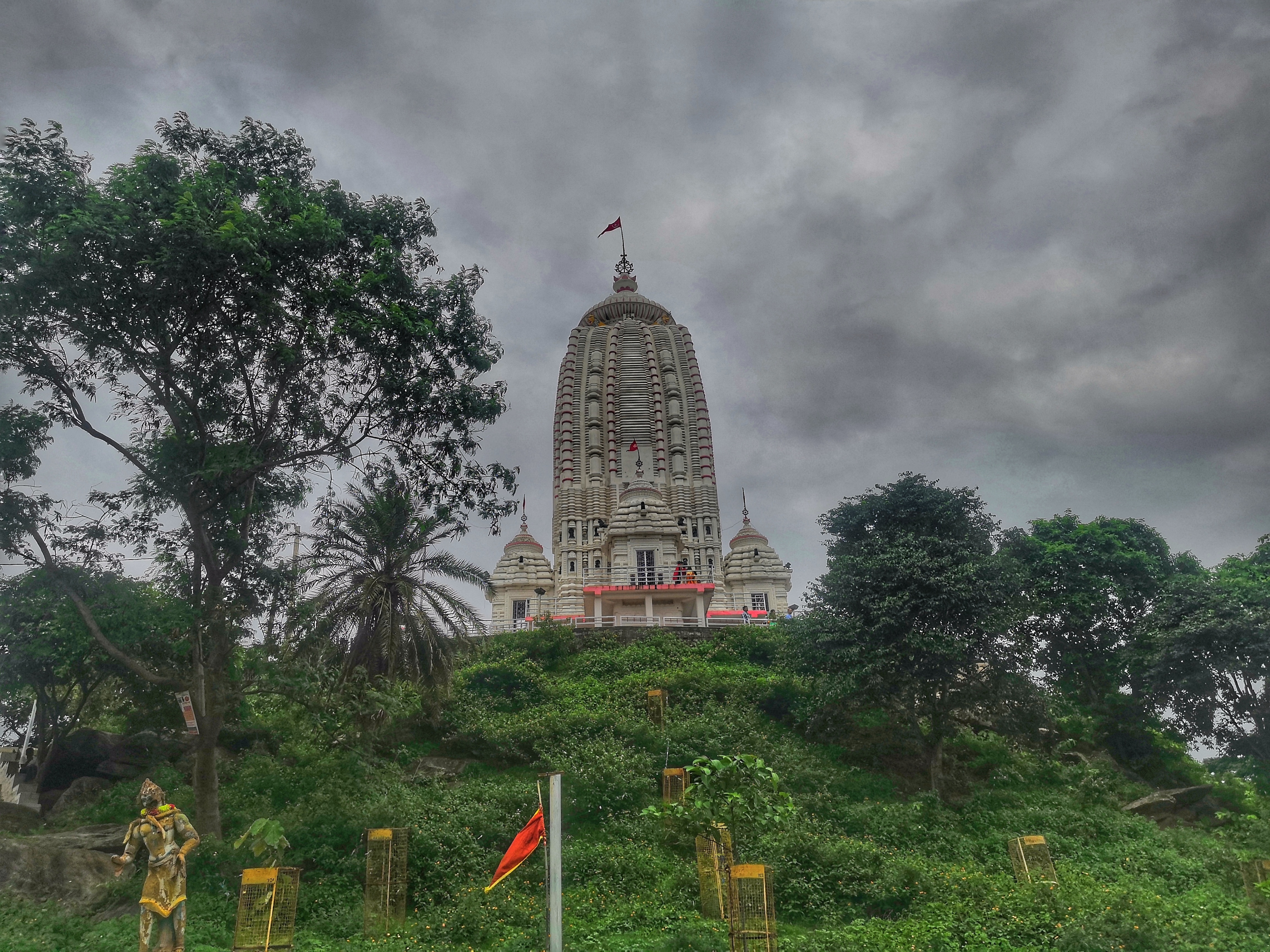
Jagannath temple at Ranchi built by king Ani Nath Shahdeo in 1691

During 18th century Nagvanshi became vassal of East India Company. Vishwanath Shahdeo was king of Barkagarh estate during 19th century. He disliked authoritarian way of functioning of British official and forcible possession of his lands by Christian Kol tribals encouraged by the Christian missionaries. When he complaint about it to the British officials, they took no action about it.

During Rebellion of 1857, when rebels asked him to lead them and he accepted the offer. He organised an army with the assistance of nearby zamindars including Pandey Ganpat Rai, Tikait Umrao Singh, Sheikh Bhikhari, Jaimangal Singh, Nadir Ali Khan, Brij Bhusan Singh, Chama Singh, Shiva Singh, Ram Lal Singh and Bijai Ram Singh to overthrow Company rule. He fought against East India company force in Battle of Chatra in 1857 but got defeated. They escaped and continued their battle against British in Ranchi. The king of Pithoria, Jagatpal Singh assisted British against the rebels. Viswanath Shahdeo attack Jagatpal Singh in Pithuriya and battle continued for several days. In the end Vishwanath Shahdeo and his allies got defeated. Later they were caught and hanged in Ranchi in 1858. The Barkagarh estate was confiscated for rebellion against company rule. Then British destroyed the capital of Barkagarh, forts of Satranjigarh and Hatiagarh.

The wife of Viswanath Shahdeo Baneswari Kunwar fled to forest of Rani Khorha in Gumla district with her one-year son Kapil Nath Shahdeo and few trusted individuals due to danger to her life and her son as She know that British can kill her and her son. She lived 12 years in exile then she demanded return of property of Barkagarh estate. British refused but they agreed to pay Rani Baneswari Kunwar Rs.30 per month from tax collected by Barkagarh property.

=== Post Independence ===
Thakur Naveen Nath Shahdeo, the descendant of Thakur Vishwanath Shahdeo was the vice president of Jagannath Mandir Nyas Sammiti and the first servant of Jagannath temple.

== Ruler ==
- Ani Nath Shahdeo
- Jagannath Shahdeo
- Gopi Nath Shahdeo
- Pyare Nath Shahdeo
- Nayan Nath Shahdeo
- Raghunath Shahdeo
- Vishwanath Shahdeo (c.1840-1858 CE)

== Erstwhile Ruling Family Genealogy ==
- Kapilnath Shahdeo
- Jagnnath Shahdeo
- Devendra Nath Shahdeo
- Bagleshwar Nath Shahdeo
- Naveen Nath Shahdeo (till 2022): He was the vice president of Jagannath mandir Nyash Sammiti and the first servant of Jagannath temple. He died on 19 April 2022.
- Sudhanshu Nath Shahdeo (2022–present)
