= History of Ranchi district =

Ranchi district is one among the twenty-four districts of the state of Jharkhand in Eastern India. This region was under the control of the Magadha Empire, then it was a part of the Mauryan Empire under Ashoka and later a part of the Gupta Empire. After the fall of the Gupta Empire a legendary king named Phanimukut established the Nagvanshi dynasty and controlled the Chota Nagpur Plateau region for several centuries thereafter.

== Early history ==
The early evidence of use of several Iron slag, pot sheds, Iron tools found in Chota Nagpur Plateau region around 1400 BCE. Samudragupta, while marching through the present-day Chotanagpur region, directed the first attack against the kingdom of Dakshina Kosala in the Mahanadi valley.

== Medivial period ==
Nagvanshi dynasty was ruling in the region. The region was free from any external influence until the accession of Akbar the Great to the Mughal throne. In the year 1585, Akbar's forces defeated the Raja of Kokrah Madhu Singh and exploited the resources of the region. Nagvanshi dynasty became vassal of Mughal Empire.

Later Jahangir, the son of Akbar sent his forces under the leadership of the Governor of Bihar, Ibrahim Khan and captivated the forty-fifth Kokrah chief, Durjan Sal to Delhi and later to Gwalior for a period of twelve years. Later the chief was reinstated at Kokrah with a fixed tribute. In 17th century Raja Raghunath Shah ruled for several years, he was poet, he also constructed several temples. Later the region eventually came under the British rule.

== British Raj ==
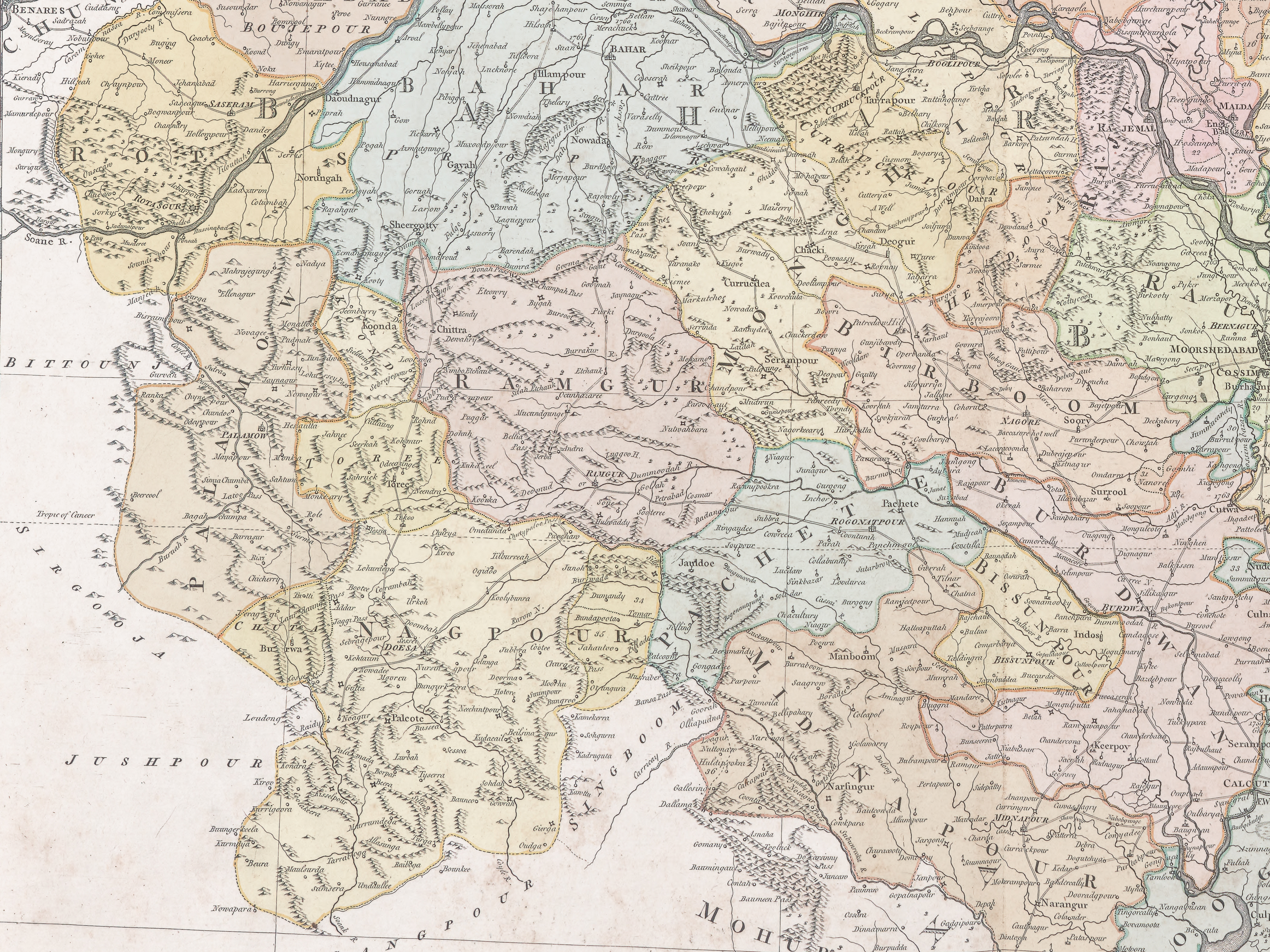
Administrative map of Chota Nagpur, 1770s

After the Battle of Plassey in 1757, the British Raj established its firm control over the Indian subcontinent. In 1765, Chota Nagpur region also went into their control. A settlement was made by the British in 1772 with Nagvanshi Maharaja. This administration could not last long. In 1817 the Ranchi district along with the adjoining territories were directly administrated by the Magistrate of Ramgarh. The discontent expressed the people took the form of various revolts in the years 1811, 1820 and 1831. To control these revolts and for better administration, a separate province named South-West Frontier Agency was formed in 1833 which included the Chota Nagpur region and also the adjoining region of Dhalbhum. The district was known as Lohardaga district and also included the present day district of Palamu. The city of Lohardaga was the administrative headquarters of the district. However in 1840, the headquarters were moved to Ranchi. In 1854, the system of governance in Chota Nagpur changed once again and the region was constituted as a Non-regulation province under the control of the Commissioner.

== 1857 Movement ==
In the Sepoy Mutiny of 1857, the main head of the Chota Nagpur region did not interfere but the Ramgarh Battalion at Ranchi participated. Thakur Vishwanath Shahdeo, Pandey Ganpat Rai, Tikait Umrao Singh and Sheikh Bhikhari played pivotal role in Indian Rebellion of 1857. Several possessions, estates and property of the Zamindars were confiscated. The British eventually succeeded in regaining control over the region and the revolt was suppressed.

== Events after 1857 ==
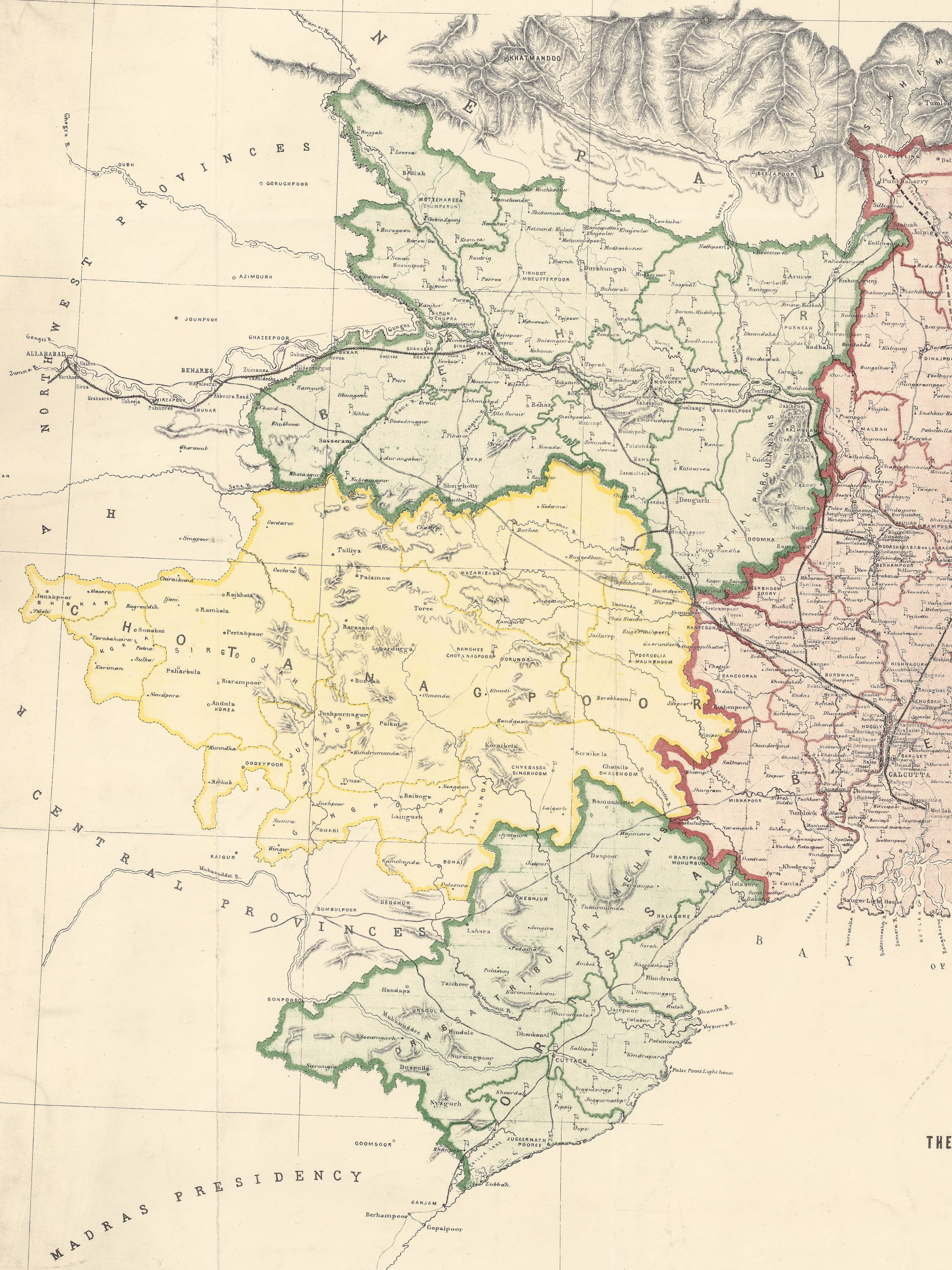
Ranchi in extended Lohardaga district, Chota Nagpur Division of the Bengal Presidency, 1872

After 1857, for several years there was no significant system of Governance with the Munda population expressing discontent over the condition of their people. The last fifteen years of the nineteenth century were constituted by agitations of the sardars or leaders whose chief objective was to make a living for themselves at the expense of the people. In 1892 the subdivision of Palamu along with the Tori pargana were formed into a separate district bifurcating Lohardaga district. The South-Western Frontier Agency was directly administrated by an agent to the Governor-General. In 1899, a small rising was initiated by Birsa Munda, who encouraged the people to revolt and restore the pride of the Munda tribe. The people revered him as a God-sent leader with miraculous powers. The movement was suppressed with ease by the local authorities and Birsa Munda was imprisoned in the Ranchi Jail, where he died few years later. In 1899, the name of the Lohardaga district was changed to Ranchi district.

== During Freedom Struggle ==
The district played an important role during the Indian struggle for independence. Under the guidance of Ganesh Chandra Ghosh Ranchi became an epicenter of activities for the followers of Revolutionary campaigns. Ranchi was the venue of two meetings between Mahatma Gandhi and Sir Edward Albert Gait, Lieutenant Governor of Bihar and Orissa on 4 June 1917 and another meeting on 22 September 1917 in the context of the Champaran Indigo planters repressive measures against the raiyats of the district. The Champaran agrarian law subsequently passed as Bihar and Orissa Act-I of 1918.

== Post Independence ==
The green-shaded area of current district map of Jharkhand, represents the former Ranchi district from which other districts were carved out.

After India achieved Independence, Ranchi district as a part of Chota Nagpur was included in the state of Bihar. In 1983 Ranchi district bifurcated into three districts viz, Ranchi, Lohardaga and Gumla. However due to demographics disparity between north and south erstwhile Bihar, the southern region formed as Jharkhand state in 15 November 2000. In 2001 and 2007, Simdega and Khunti district ware formed by curving out of Gumla and Ranchi district respectively.

== See also ==
- Ranchi district
- History of Jharkhand
