= Khokhra Chieftaincy =

Dynasty in Chota Nagpur

Khokhra chieftaincy
- 15th century CE–1952
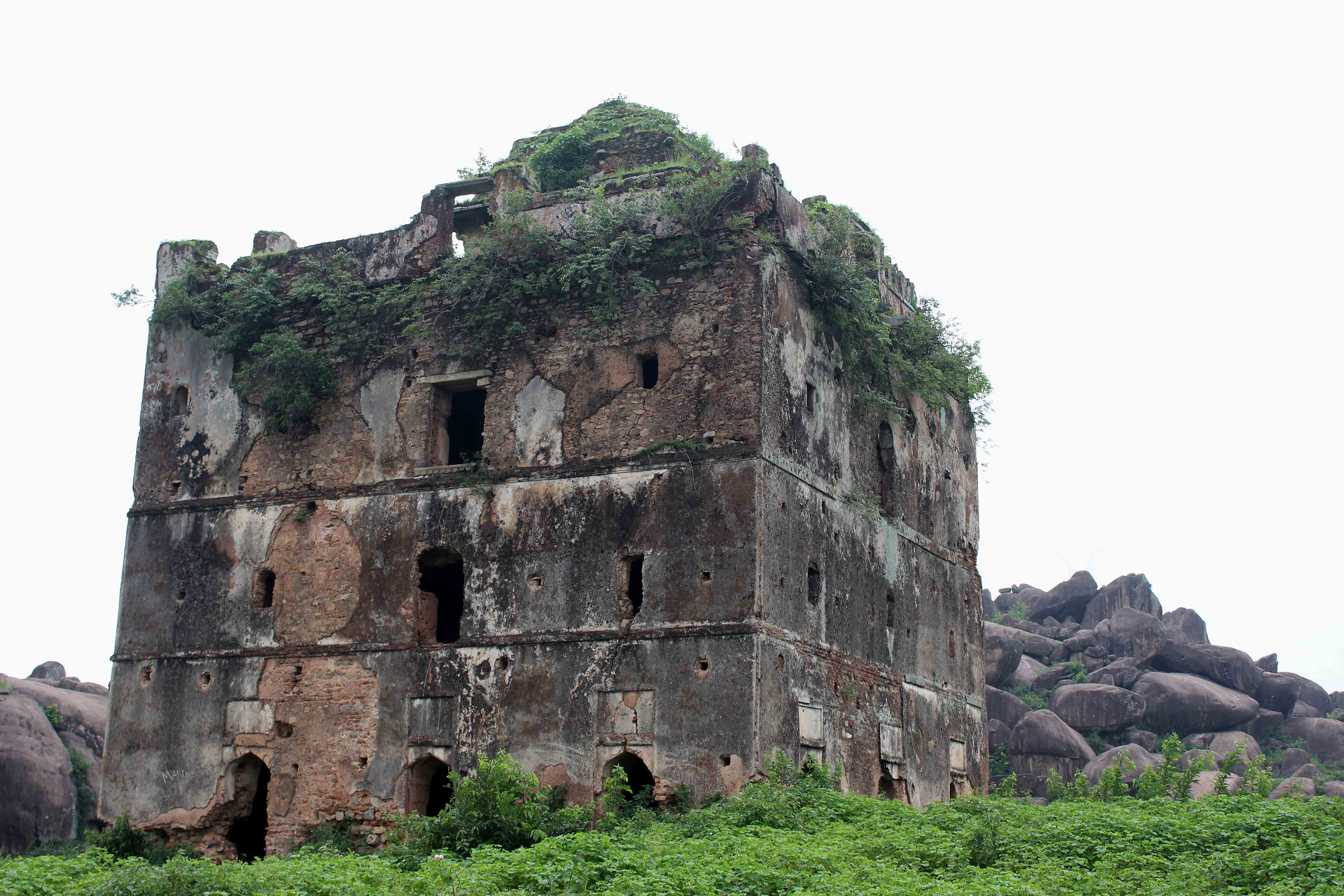
- Navratnagarh fort
- Status: Vassal state of the Mughal Empire (1585–1733); Vassal state of the British East India Company (1771–1817)
- Capital: Navratangarh
- Religion: Hinduism
- Government: Principality
- History
  - Established: 15th century CE
  - Disestablished: 1952
Succeeded by
Republic of India

The Khokhra chieftaincy, also known as the Nagvanshi dynasty, was a principality that ruled the parts of Chota Nagpur Plateau region (modern-day Jharkhand) during much of the medieval and early-modern period. The chieftaincy came to prominence while the region was part of Bihar Subah in the Mughal Empire.

Legendary accounts trace the founder of this dynasty to be Phani Mukut Rai who lived during the 1st century CE, however the definite history of the Khokhra chieftaincy begins from the 15th century onwards.

== Origin ==
The origins of the Khokhras are unknown and while the family claimed to be Kshatriya, recent evidence points to them having their origins with the Munda tribe before the leader of the tribe, Madra Munda, was adopted into the Nagvanshis.

== History ==
=== Mughal period ===
The Khokhra family receives no mention during the period the Delhi Sultanate and even during the reign of Sher Shah Suri. The reason for this likely relates to the isolated location from which the Khokhras ruled as none of the ruling authorities in Bihar were able to reach them. During the Mughal period, it was Emperor Akbar who was the first to try and expand into the territory of the Khokhras. Abul Fazl writes that in 1585 CE, the emperor requested Shahbaz Khan Kamboh to attack the Khokhras after the chief, Madhukar Rai, had refused to accept the overlordship of the Mughals as he was confident that the forests and mountains of his principality would protect him. Shahbaz Khan eventually went on to conquer the Khokhras and Madhukar Rai agreed to pay land revenue to the Mughals. In the 1590s, Madhukar Rai was asked to serve in the imperial army for a campaign against the Afghans of Odisha along with other zamindars of Bihar including those of the Gidhaur chieftaincy and Kharagpur Raj.

Madhukar Rai died in 1599 and was replaced by Bairisal who according to records visited the Emperor in Delhi and accompanied him on various expeditions. Because of his services, he was rewarded with valuable gifts and granted the pargana of Sherghati. However, in 1613 Bairisal rebelled against the Mughals and the Baharistan-i-Ghaibi mentions that Bairisal failed to fulfill payment of revenue. The Mughal General, Zafar Khan, besieged the Khokhras however just as he was about the achieve victory, news about the death of Islam Khan, then Governor of Bengal spread and Zafar Khan was forced to reach a settlement with the Khokhras so that he could move to Bengal to reestablish control. Zafar Khan soon returned to Chota Nagpur under the orders of the Emperor but before he could relaunch his campaign, he was struck by an illness which left him paralysed and the campaign was unable to go ahead.

Bairisal died in 1614 and was succeeded by his son, Durjan Shah who continued to defy Mughal authority however he was eventually defeated and Khokhra was annexed into the Mughal empire by the governor of Bihar, Ibrahim Khan Fath-i-Jang in 1615. Emperor Jahangir noted that Durjan Shah was imprisoned for at least three years following the subjugation of Khokhradesh. A story recounts that Durjan Shah was released from prison after Jahangir was impressed with his ability to judge the purity of diamonds. As per the terms of his release, Durjan Shah was to pay tribute of 6000 Rs and was also conferred with the title of Shah. Durjan Shah died in 1640 and was succeeded by his son, Ram Shah.

Ram Shah built Kapilnath Temple in 1643 CE in Navratangarh. Raghunath Shah (1663–1690) built several temples, including Madan Mohan temple in Boera and Jagannath temple. According to Lal Pradumn Singh, the writer of the book Nagvansh, the Mughals invaded Khukhra during the reign of Raghunath Shah. Mughal officials were sent by Aurangzeb to attack Khokhra. The invasion was strongly resisted which resulted in the death of Mughal officials. Later he agreed to pay tax to the Mughals. Thakur Ani Nath Shahdeo made Satranji the capital of Barkagarh estate near Subarnarekha river. He built the Jagannath temple in 1691.

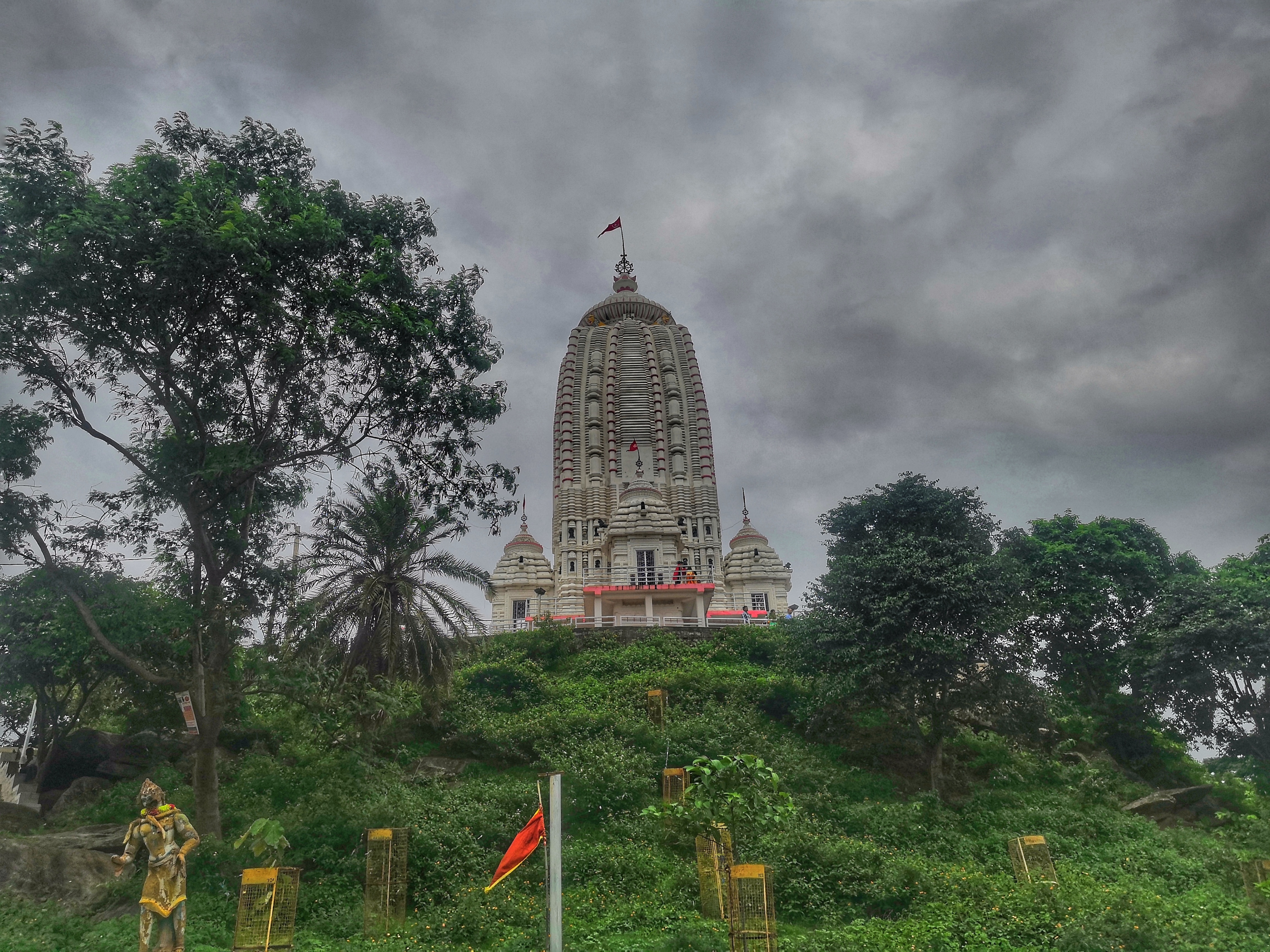
Jagannath temple at Ranchi built by king Ani Nath Shahdeo in 1691

In 1719, during the reign of Emperor Muhammad Shah, Sarbuland Khan invaded to Chotanagpur plateau. Raja Yadunath Shah agreed to pay Rs. 100,000 (one lakh) as Nazrana. Then Yadunath Shah shifted the capital from Navratangarh to Palkot upon realising the weakness of the capital from a defensibility point of view. He was succeeded by his eldest son, Shivnath Shah (1724–1733). Due to non-payment of tribute, Fakhr-ud-daula invaded Khokhra in 1731. He faced considerable resistance from the Raja of Khokhra but both parties reached a compromise and he paid Rs. 12,000 as tribute. When Fakhr-ud-daula was removed from the post of Subedar of Bihar Suba in 1733, the Khokhra chief discontinued the payment of tribute to the Mughals. Maninath Shah (1748-1762) consolidated his authority over the estates of Bundu, Silli, Barwe, Rahe, and Tamar, and the chiefs of these estates were compelled to acknowledge the Nagvanshi ruler as their chief.

=== British period ===
After the Battle of Buxar in 1764, the East India Company was given the right to collect revenue from Bihar, Bengal and Odisha by the Mughal Empire. In 1771, during the reign of Dripnath Shah, Nagvanshi became a vassal of the East India Company due to conflicts with neighbouring kings and tribes.

Between 1760 and 1770, the Maratha Empire invaded Chotanagpur and looted and collected revenue forcefully. The British defeated the Maratha forces in 1772. The British stationed military forces at Chotanagpur to check the incursions of Marathas. During the reign of Govind Nath Shah, due to the rebellion, refusal of payment of revenue by subordinate Jagirdar and Zamindar under Nagvanshi king due to excessive tax imposition by the East India Company, Chotanagpur was brought under direct control by the East India Company in 1817 and they reduced Nagvanshi rulers to Zamindars. The disposition of some Mankis in Sonepur Pargana and the mistreatment of a Manki by contractors resulted in the Kol uprising in 1831 to 1833 when Munda plundered and burned the properties of Sikh and Muslim contractors. Then these activities spread to Ranchi district and tribal Munda, Hos and Oraon indulged in indiscriminate plunder and killings of Muslims and Sikhs as well as villages of Hindus. They destroyed the Mahamaya temple built by Gajghat Rai in Hapamuni village of Gumla. These activities spread to Palamu and were joined by Kharwar and Chero. This insurgency was suppressed by Thomas Wilkinson.

In 1855, during the reign of Jagannath Shah Deo, the king of Barkagarh estate, Vishwanath Shahdeo, stopped following the orders of the East India Company, defeated British forces in Hatia and ruled independently for two years. During the Rebellion of 1857, he led the rebels of the Ramgarh Battalion. He organised an army with the assistance of nearby zamindars including Pandey Ganpat Rai, Tikait Umrao Singh, Sheikh Bhikhari, Jaimangal Singh, and Nadir Ali Khan. He fought against an East India Company force in the Battle of Chatra but was defeated. Jagatpal Singh, King of Pithoria, helped the British to defeat the rebels. Thakur Vishwanath Shahdeo was captured and hanged in Ranchi along with other rebels in April 1858. Later Barkagarh estate was confiscated for rebellion against Company rule.

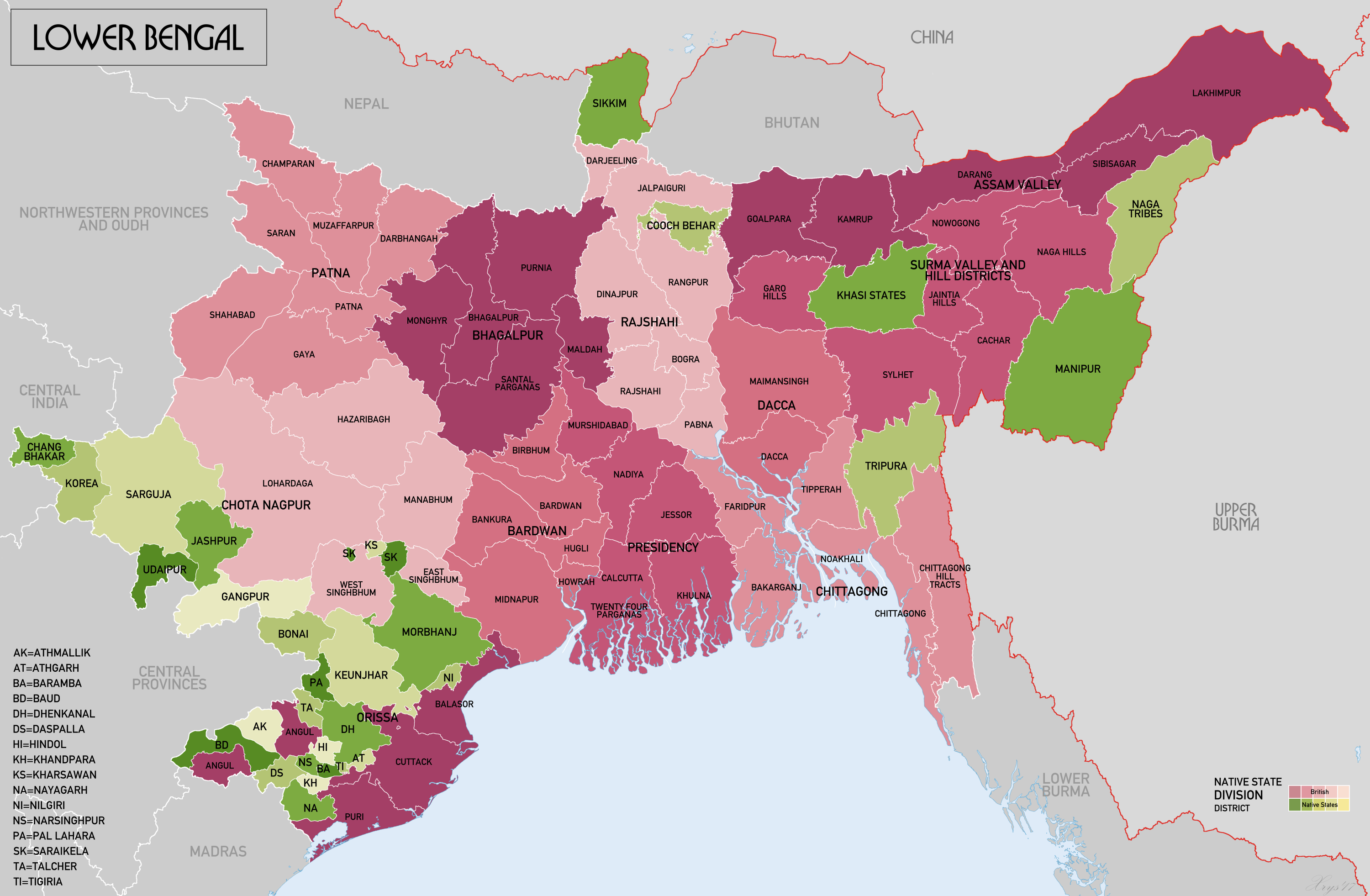
Map of Chotanagpur in Lower Bengal in 1870

The Nagvanshi rulers shifted their capital from Palkot to Ratu in 1870. Udai Pratap Nath Shah Deo built Ratu Palace in 1900. The last ruler of the Nagvanshi dynasty was Lal Chintamani Sharan Nath Shahdeo (1931–2014). Zamindari was abolished after the independence of India in 1952.

=== Branches ===
Following are the states and estates established by Nagvanshi princes:

- Barkagarh estate of Satrangi (now in Ranchi)
- Khairagarh State of Khairagarh-Chhuikhadan-Gandai district, Chhattisgarh
- Kalahandi State of Kalahandi, Odisha
- Nilgiri State of Nilagiri, Baleswar, Odisha
- Jariagarh Estate of Khunti district

=== Post-independence ===
In the modern period, the Nagvanshi are divided into two subgroups namely Rajdariya, the descendants of the royal family, and the Lohardagiya, the inhabitants of Lohardaga district. Lohardagiyas wield a lot of influence in present-day Lohardaga and Latehar districts despite being fewer in numbers demographically. They have only one gotra Kashyap. Nagvanshi practice exogamy and establish relationships with other royal families. The Nagvanshi use Shahdeo as their surname. They speak the Nagpuri language and Hindi with others. They are non-vegetarian and eat rice, wheat and pulses.

== Rulers ==
Following is the list of Nagvanshi rulers according to "Nag Vanshavali" (1876) written by Beniram Mehta during reign of Jagannath Shah Deo and book "Nagvansh" (1951) written by Lal Pradumn Singh during reign of Lal Chintamani Sharan Nath Shahdeo. There is considerable disagreement among historians about chronology of various kings and its authenticity. 57th Nagvanshi king Dripnath Shah (c. 1762–1790 CE) submitted list of Nagvanshi kings to the Governor General of India in 1787.

=== Raja ===
- Raja Madhu Karn Shah (16th century)
- Raja Bairisal
- Raja Durjan Shah (17th century)
- Raja Deo Shah
- Raja Ram Shah (1640-1663)
- Raja Raghunath Shah (1663–1690)
- Raja Yadunath Shah (1690–1724)
- Raja Shivnath Shah (1724–1733)
- Raja Udainath Shah (1733-1740)
- Raja Shyamsundar Nath Shah (1740–1745)
- Raja Balram Nath Shah (1745–1748)
- Raja Maninath Shah (1748–1762)
- Raja Dripnath Shah (1762–1790)
- Raja Deo Nath Shah (1790–1806)

=== Maharaja ===
- Maharaja Govind Nath Shah (1806–1822)
- Maharaja Jagannath Shah Deo (1822–1869)
- Maharaja Udai Pratap Nath Shah Deo (1869/72–1950)
- Maharaja Lal Chintamani Sharan Nath Shahdeo (1950–1952)

== See also ==
- Chota Nagpur Division
- Chota Nagpur Tributary States
