= Jagannath Shah Deo =

Nagvanshi king

- Maharaja
- Reign: c. 1822 – 1869 CE
- Predecessor: Govind Nath Shah
- Successor: Udai Pratap Nath Shah Deo
- Born: Palkot
- Died: 9 July 1869; Bharno
- Spouse: Luchun Kunwar
- Dynasty: Nagvanshi
- Religion: Hinduism

Jagannath Shah Deo was a Nagvanshi king in the 19th century. He succeeded Govind Nath Shah and ruled from 1822 to 1869 CE. During his reign, Kol uprising and Sepoy mutiny of 1857 happened. He was ally of British East India company. During his reign, Beniram Mehta had written the book Nagvanshavali, the genealogy of Nagvanshi kings in Nagpuri language which was published in 1876.

== Reign ==
In July 1822, Govind Nath Shah died. He had three sons Jagannath Shah Deo, Shrinath Shah Deo and Mohan Nath Shah Deo. Jagannath Shah Deo succeeded the throne in 1822. Jagannath Shah Deo could not manage the economy. He incurred debts with Sikh horse traders and Muslim cloth merchant, so he leased villages to them to collect taxes. These people were known as thekedars. They extorted villagers by violence and fraud. They wanted to squeeze taxes as much as possible from the villagers in the form of rents, abwabs and salamis etc. Thus the tribal face exploitation. Harinath Shahi, the younger brother of Jagannath Shah Deo, assigned some villages to some Sikh and Muslim thikedars in Sonepur. They deprived the Munda Mankis of their villages and seduced the sisters of the Mankis. The incidents resulted in the plundering of the houses and killings of Sikh and Muslims Thikedars by Manki Munda and their followers. The rebels forcefully took away 2000 cattles of Kuhang and Kumang village. They also attacked the other villages of Sonepur Pargana, plundered and burnt them down. Some joined the rebellion with the fear of a social boycott and others got the opportunity to plunder and loot. The majority of people joined as their leaders appealed to them. The Rebellion is known as Kol uprising.

The rebels attacked the Bundu. They plundered and destroyed the houses of non-tribals. The rebels indulged in loot, plunder and killings of non-tribals in Panch Pargana region of Bundu, Tamar. Thomas Wilkinson suppressed the rebellion. The rebel leaders and their followers were killed while some were arrested. Then police station were established in Bundu, Tamar, Silli, Palkot, Barwe. In 1842, the administrative headquarters transferred from Lohardaga to Ranchi. The kings of Bundu, Tamar, Rahe, Sili, Barway were vassals of the Nagvanshi kings. The British government increased the rent on the region. The tribal people were forced to work on the land of the Jamindars. The Christian missionaries arrived in the region in 1845 and converted many tribes to Christianity.

In 1957, the Rebellion occurred under the leadership of Vishwanath Shahdeo, Pandey Ganpat Rai. The Nagvanshi king stood with the British. Later, property of rebellion were confiscated by the British in December 1857. Vishwanath Shahdeo was caught with the assistance of Mahesh Narayan Shahi in Lohardaga and hanged with other rebels on 16 April 1858. The British thanked King Jagannath Shah Deo for his cooperation. After the Rebellion, the properties of rebels were confiscated. British gave pension to King of Pithuriya Jagatpal Singh for suppression of Rebellion. Britain directly took control of India after 1857 Rebellion.

== Descendants ==
King Jagannath Shah Deo had no sons. Lal Upendra Nath Shah Deo, the eldest son of Srinath Shah Deo, the brother of Jagannath Shah Deo, was looking after the affairs of Nagvanshi and expected to succeed him and tried to stop granting of villages to Brahmins and other needy people. In disgust, Jagannath Shah Deo left for Palkot in 1865. Then he returned to Nagfeni, then to Bharno, where he constructed a fort. Two sons were born from his two wives. The older boy was Pratap Udai Nath Shah Deo, whose mother was queen Luchun Kunwar. He could not succeed in appointing his son as the next king as he died on 9 July 1869. Then there was litigation by Lal Upendra Nath Shah Deo for the rightful owner of the throne. He claimed that Pratap Udai Nath Shah Deo was the adopted son of queen Luchun Kunwar. The judge, Colonel E.A. Rowlate, decided the case in favour of Lal Upendra Nath Shah Deo. The court of wards representing minors, Udai Pratap Nath Shah Deo, appealed to the privy council in London which decided the case in favour of minors. The Pratap Udai Nath Shah Deo was declared the king of Chotanagpur. The queen Luchun Kunwar shifted to Ratu and a palace was created in 1975. The Nagvanshi Gond lineage is traditionally associated with the ancient Nagvanshi Kshatriya dynasty of Chotanagpur, whose legendary founder is regarded as Phani Mukut Rai. Historical references and inscriptions such as those found at the Bhoramdeo Temple and Mandwa Mahal of the Kawardha princely state refer to genealogical traditions connected with the Nagvanshi rulers.
