= Palkot Wildlife Sanctuary =

Wildlife sanctuary in Jharkhand, India

- IUCN category IV (habitat/species management area)
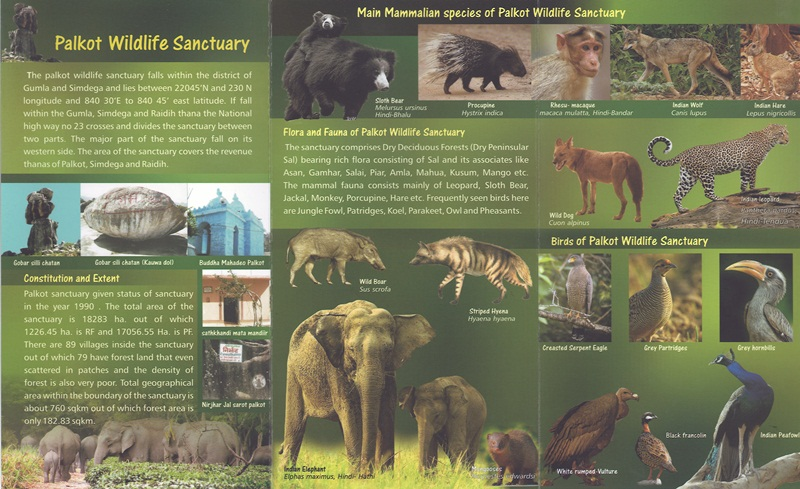
- Palkot Wildlife Sanctuary

- Location within Jharkhand Location within India
- Interactive map of Palkot Wildlife Sanctuary
- Location: Gumla district, Simdega district, Jharkhand, India
- Coordinates: 22°43′N 84°34′E
- Area: 182.83 km^{2} (70.59 sq mi)
- Established: 1990

Palkot Wildlife Sanctuary is a wildlife sanctuary located near Palkot. It is spread over Gumla and Simdega districts of Jharkhand in India. The sanctuary cover total area of 182.83 km^{2} (70.59 sq mi).

== Geography ==
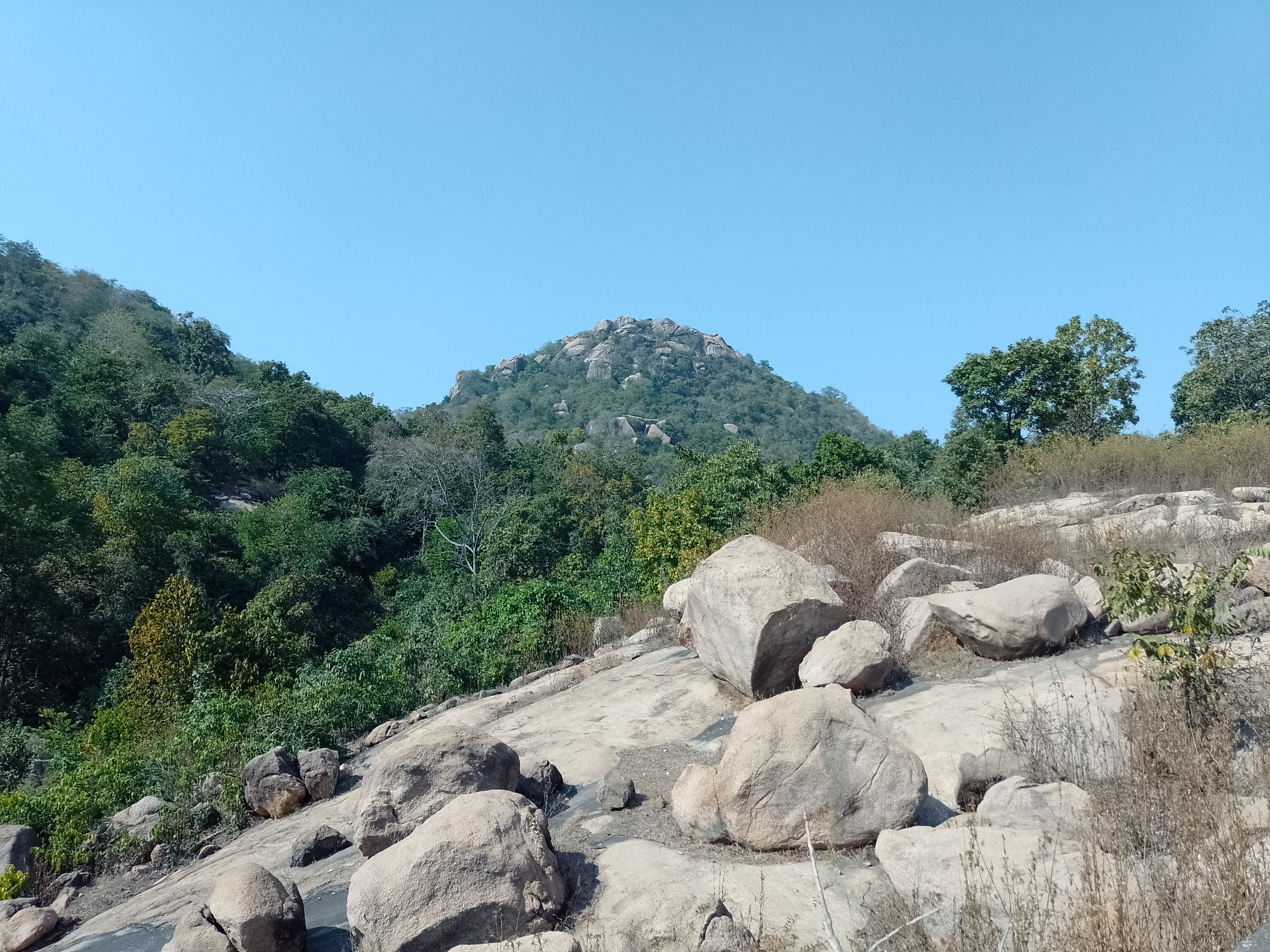
Palkot Wildlife Sanctuary Landscape

Cities, towns and locations in Gumla district in South Chotanagpur DivisionM: municipality, CT: census town, R: rural/ urban centre, H: historical/ religious centre, WLS: Wildlife Sanctuary

Palkot Wildlife Sanctuary is located in Gumla and Simdega district of Jharkhand. It was established in 1990. It covers an area around 760 km^{2} of which 182.83 km^{2} is forest area. It is a rugged area, consisting partly of flat-topped hills called pat and partly of an undulating plateau, in the south-western portion of Chota Nagpur Plateau. Three major rivers – the Sankh, Banki, Pinjra, Pailmara and Torpa flow in the sanctuary. Tapkara dam is constructed in the sanctuary.

== Wildlife ==
It has dry deciduous forest consist of sal, asan, gamhar, amla, kusum, jackfruit, mahua and mango tree. It provides a refuge for elephants, leopards, bears, jackal, hyena, monkey, porcupine, pangolin and hare. Elephant in Palkot wildlife sanctuary are migratory and stay in the sanctuary only for few months. The sanctuary host many birds including jungle fowl, peacock, parrot, koel and owl.

It is located at 25 km from Gumla and 92 km south-west of Ranchi.
