= Phani Mukut Rai =

- Raja

1st Nagvanshi king
- Reign: c. 94 - 162 CE (according to legend); 4th or 10th century (according to scholars)
- Predecessor: Pundarika Naga
- Successor: Mukut Rai
- Issue: Mukut Rai
- Dynasty: Nagvanshi
- Father: Pundarika Naga
- Mother: Parvati
- Religion: Hinduism

Phani Mukut Rai was the king of the Nagvanshi dynasty in Nagvanshi origin myth and is considered its founder in the first century CE. However, the story of Phani Mukut Rai is regarded as a myth by historians, who date the establishment of the Nagvanshi dynasty to around the fourth or tenth century CE.

== Early life ==
According to the Nagvanshavali (1876), Phani Mukut Rai was the son of Pundarika Naga and his wife parvati, a Brahmin girl from Varanasi. Due to his forked tongue, he always slept with his back to his wife, as his poisonous breath regularly emanated from his mouth. His wife became curious about this secret, but Pundarika Naga never revealed it. They traveled to the Jagannath Temple in Puri for a pilgrimage. On their return, his wife went into labor and was near death. She wished to know his secret, so Pundarika Naga transformed into a cobra, revealed his secret, and then plunged into a pond.

His wife, Parvati, committed sati out of grief after giving birth to a child. Pundarika Naga shielded the child with his hood. A woodcutter saw this and informed a Sakaldwipiya Brahmin named Janardan, who was holding a sun idol. The Brahmin witnessed the incident. Pundarika Naga told the Brahmin his story, stating that the boy would become the king of Nagpur and that the Brahmin would become his priest. The Brahmin named the child Phani Mukut Rai, as he had been protected by the cobra's hood, and raised him. The Brahmin, who held the sun idol, made it the tutelary deity of the Nagvanshi dynasty as suggested by Pundarika Naga.

According to a report by Webster, Phani Mukut Rai was raised by the Kanyabuja Brahmin.

== Chieftaincy ==
According to Nagvanshi tradition, Phani Mukut Rai was elected as Raja by the Parha chief and other Rajas of Suguja and the king of Patkum around 94 AD and ruled for 68 years. His capital was at Sutiambe, now located in the Ranchi district, where he resided in a mud fort. According to Nagvanshi tradition, this occurred in 104 CE. During his reign, he defeated Rakshel of Korambe and invaders from Kendujhar with the help of the king of Panchet. His rule extended to Badin in Kharsawan, Ramgarh, Gola, Tori, and Gharwe. He built a sun temple in Sutiambe, invited Pandas from Puri to establish idols in the Thakurbadi, and settled Brahmins by giving them the villages of Sornda and Mahugaon. His Diwan was Srivastav Kayasth, with Pandey Bhav Rai, a resident of Belkupi village, serving as his advisor. According to Lal Praduman Singh, the author of "Nagvansh," during Phani Mukut Rai's reign, the Nagvanshi kingdom was divided into 66 parganas: 22 in Ghatwa, 18 in Khukhragarh, 18 in Doisagarh, and 8 in Jarichgarh.

However, the remains of the idol from the Sun temple near Pithoria have been dated to the 12th century CE. No archaeological evidence has been discovered to validate the story of Phani Mukut Rai. Many scholars place the establishment of the Nagvanshi dynasty in the 4th century CE, based on an average ruling period of 25 years for each king.

According to the genealogy provided by Dripnath Shah to the Governor General of India in 1787, Phani Mukut Rai was the first Nagvanshi king, the son of Pundarik Naga and Sakaldwipiya Brahmin girl Parvati. However, the story is mostly considered a origin myth and is viewed as a Brahminical origin of the dynasty invented at a later period.

According to the Nagvanshavali, Phani Mukut Rai married the daughter of the Govanshi Raja of Panchet.

== Historicity ==
The story of Phani Mukut Rai is considered a myth by scholars. According to Nagvanshi dynasty annals, the establishment of the Nagvanshi dynasty occurred in 1st the century CE, but historians don't agree with this as there is no mention of the Nagvanshi dynasty in Kushan and Gupta period sources. Arun Kumar, the writer of Ranchi district gazetteer, mentioned the establishment of the Nagvanshi dynasty in the 4th century by taking 25 years for each king. Chinese travelers, Faxian and Xuanzang who traveled during the 4th and 7th centuries respectively near the border of Chhotangpur also do not mention any kings of Nagvanshi dynasty. According to J. Reed, the writer of survey and settlement operations in the Ranchi district, the Nagvanshi dynasty was probably established in the 10th century. There is no archeological evidence of Phani Mukut Rai, but only a story is found among Nagvanshi and Mundas that Phani Mukut Rai was the son of Pundrika Nag and Brahmin girl Parvati. Pundrika Nag was adopted by Parha chief Madra Munda and elected as parha chief by the neighbouring chiefs. Before this period, there was no concept of a king among Mundas. The concept of a king was established by the Nag tribe, who were more developed in economics and politics. Later, after the establishment of the Nagvanshi dynasty, they formed the origin myth.
