= Kapilnath Temple =

- Location in Jharkhand Kapilnath Temple (India)

Religion
- Affiliation: Hinduism
- District: Gumla
- Deity: Shiva
- Festival: Shivratri

Location
- Location: Navratangarh
- State: Jharkhand
- Country: India
- Interactive map of Kapilnath Temple
- Coordinates: 23°7′N 84°46′E

Architecture
- Creator: Ram Shah
- Completed: 1643 CE

Kapilnath Temple near Navratangarh, is a 17th-century temple dedicated to Shiva in Gumla district of Jharkhand. It was built by king Ram Shah in 1643 CE. Many people come to worship daily and in Shivratri festival.

== History ==
Earlier the capital of Nagvanshis was in Khukhragarh. The temple was constructed by king Ram Shah the successor of Durjan Shah in Vikram samvat 1700 (1643 CE) in near Navratangarh. Ram Shah was brother of King Durjan Sal. According to legend, he witnessed dropping of milk of his cow in mouth of a cobra, then he saw lord Shiva. He decided to build a temple of Shiva in that place when suggested by his guru. Worship of Shiva have been continuing since then. There is no Shiva linga located inside the temple, but it is located outside the temple. There is a well located near the temple. Many devotees came to worship Shiva daily.
