= Ani Nath Shahdeo =

Nagvanshi king

- Thakur

King of Barkagarh estate
- Reign: 17th century
- Predecessor: Ram Shah
- Successor: Thakur Jagannath
- Died: Satrangi(Now in Ranchi)
- Dynasty: Nagvanshi
- Father: Ram Shah
- Mother: Mukta Devi
- Religion: Hinduism

Ani Nath Shahdeo was Nagvanshi king in 17th century. He was king of Barkagarh estate. He founded his capital at Satrangi near Subarnarekha river. He built Jagannath temple in 1691. He established Hat i.e. market at that place which is now known as Hatia.

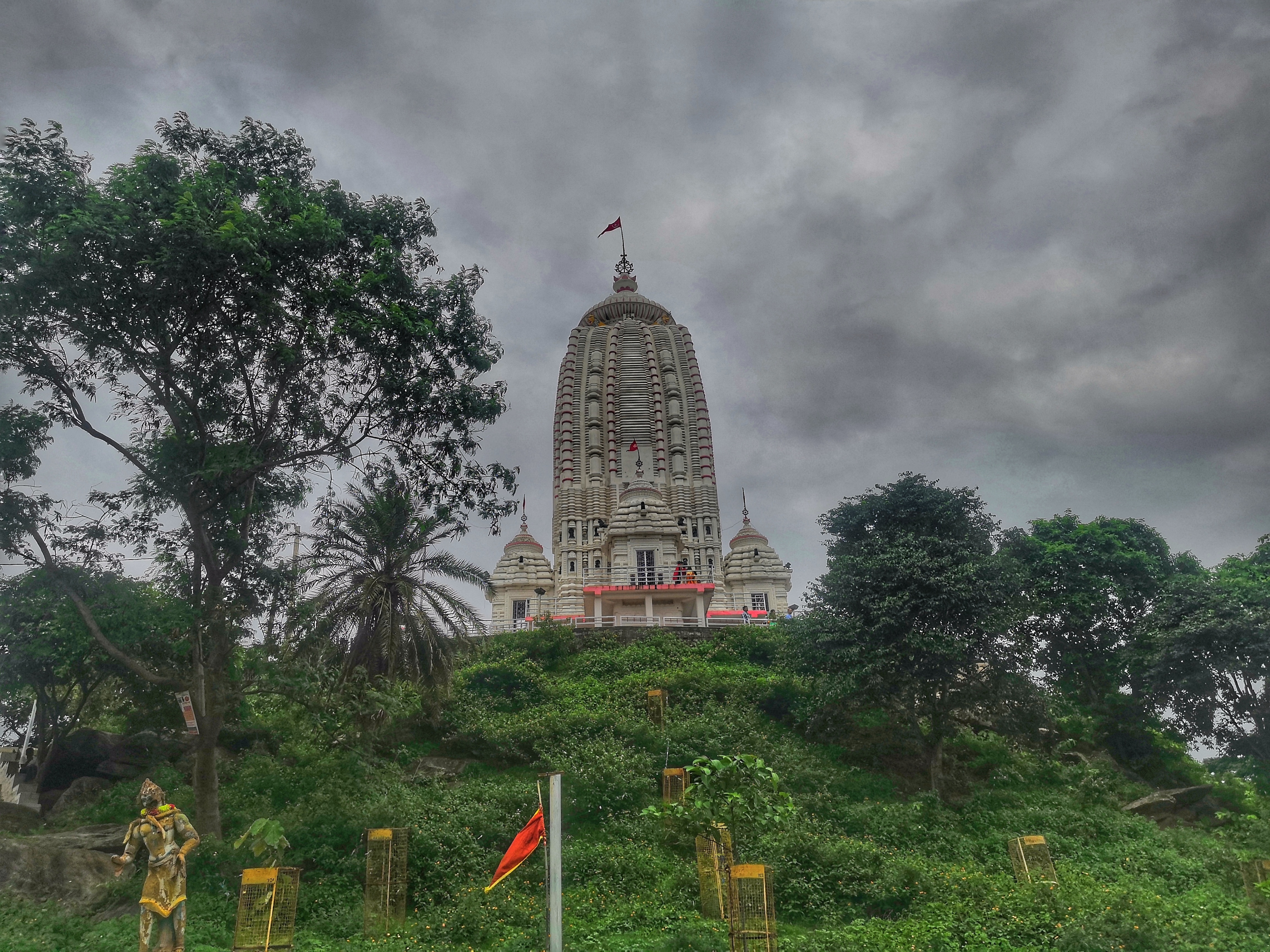
Jagannath temple at Ranchi built by king Ani Nath Shahdeo in 1691

== Personal life ==
He was son of king Ram Shah and Mukta Devi. He was younger brother of king Raghunath Shah. He married the daughter of king of Rewa.
