= Yadunath Shah =

Nagvanshi king

- Raja
- Reign: c. 1690 - 1724 CE
- Predecessor: Raghunath Shah
- Successor: Shivnath Shah
- Born: Navratangarh
- Died: 1724; Palkot
- Issue: Shivnath Shah; Syamsundar Shah; Balram Nath Shah; Mohanlal Nath Shah; Jagramlal Nath Shah; Hathilal Nath Shah
- Dynasty: Nagvanshi
- Religion: Hinduism

Yadunath Shah was a Nagvanshi king in the 18th century. His capital was at Navratangarh. He succeeded Raghunath Shah and ruled from 1690 to 1724 CE. He shifted his capital from Navratangarh to Palkot.

In 1719, Ranjit Rai, the Chero ruler of Palamu, with the help of the ruler of Ramgarh, Dalel Singh, conquered Tori and held it for three years up to 1722. Yadunath Shah took advantage of the confused state of Mughal affairs after the death of Aurangzeb and withheld the customary tribute to the Mughal. Sarbuland Khan, the Mughal Governor of the province of Bihar, was obliged to undertake an expedition against Yadunath Shah in 1717 A.D. Yadunath Shah paid him tribute of 1 lakh to avoid war. Yadunath Shah then shifted his capital from Navratangarh to Palkot upon realising its weakness from the defence point of view. However, Palkot lost its defensive value when the Maratha inroads began in the early eighteenth century. Yadunath Shah died in 1724 A.D. He had twelve sons. He was succeeded by his eldest son Shivnath Shah.
