= Vishwanath Shahdeo =

King of Barkagarh and Freedom fighter

- Thakur
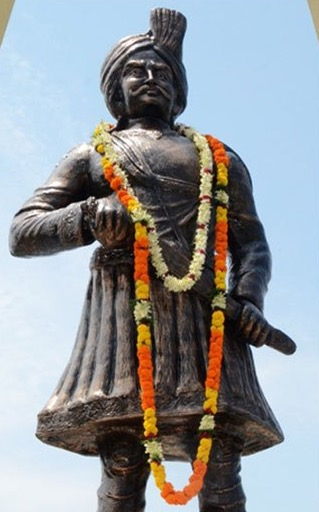
- Reign: c.1840 - 1858

King of Barkagarh estate
- Predecessor: Raghunath Shahdeo
- Born: 12 August 1817; Satranji, Ranchi, Barkagarh estate
- Died: 16 April 1858 (aged 40); Ranchi, Chota Nagpur Division, British India
- Spouse: Baneshwari Kunwar
- Issue: Kapilnath Shahdeo
- Dynasty: Nagvanshi
- Father: Raghunath Shahdeo
- Mother: Chaneshwari Kunwar

Vishwanath Shahdeo (12 August 1817 – 16 April 1858) was the king of the Barkagarh estate and a rebel in the Indian rebellion of 1857. In 1855, he declared himself independent and defeated British forces in Hatia. He led rebels of Ramgarh Battalion in 1857. But defeated by Company forces with the help of king of Pithoria Jagatpal Singh. He was eventually caught and was hung from a tree along with his accomplices in 1858.

== Life ==
=== Early life ===
He was born on 12 August 1817 in Satranji, the capital of Barkagah estate in then Lohardaga present Ranchi district. He was a member of the Nagvanshi family. Barkagarh state was granted to Nathan Shah who was grand father of Vishwanath Shahdeo for maintenance by the Nagvanshi maharaja of Chhotanagpur. He married Baneswari Kunwar, the sister of King of Rajgangpur. He succeeded his father as king of Barkagarh in 1840.

=== Independent from Company rule ===
Thakur Vishwanath Shahdeo was anti-British and anti-missionaries. The British had established civil headquarters in Ranchi, and military headquarters of the Ramgarh Battalion at Doronda, without the consent or approval of the zamindar of Barkagarh. Later German missionaries also established a church, thus the sanctity of the Jagannath temple was believed to be violated and the zamindar of Barkagarh was virtually surrounded by outsiders. He disliked the authoritarian way of functioning of the officials. The Christian Kol tribals had forcibly taken possession of his lands, encouraged by the Christian missionaries. When he complained to British officials, they paid no heed and simply ignored him. He then refused to obey British orders in 1855. This shook British authorities. The British dispatched a military force of Ramgarh Battalion from Doronda to punish him. The British force attacked Hatia, the capital of Barkagarh. In a fierce battle many British soldiers were killed and the British got defeated. Vishwanath Shahdeo won the battle. Unable to do anything for two years, the British administration remained silence.

=== Role in 1857 rebellion ===
In July 1857, during rebellion of 1857, infantry of Hazaribagh revolted who were infantry and 30 cavalry sliders with rifles. When follower of British tried to seize them near Pithoria, they went through trail of Lohardaga. Jamadar Madhav Singh revolted against Graham. On 1 August 1857, people took over property of Graham. The rebels dispatched a letter to Vishwanath Shahdeo to lead the rebellion and he readily accepted this offer. The 600 rebels of Ramgarh Battalion and forces of Viswanath Shahdeo joined. He organised a Mukti Vahini (peoples army) with the assistance of nearby zamindars including Pandey Ganpat Rai, Tikait Umrao Singh, Sheikh Bhikhari, Jaimangal Singh, Nadir Ali Khan, Brij Bhusan Singh, Chama Singh, Shiva Singh, Ram Lal Singh and Bijai Ram Singh. They burnt down houses of British in Doronda. British had to flee from Ranchi. On 11 September 1857, they went to Sherghati. Major English attacked rebels in Chatra with soldiers of Madras Regiment and Sikh Regiment which resulted in defeat of rebels. Vishwanath Shahdeo and Pandey Ganpat Rai flee and came to Ranchi and continued their struggle against Company rule.

King of Pithoria, Jagatpal Singh helped British forces. Viswanath Shahdeo attacked Jagatpal Singh in Pithoria. A fierce battle ensured in Pithoria for several days which resulted in defeat of rebels. He was caught and hanged in Ranchi on 16 April 1858. Pandey Ganpat Rai was hanged on 21 April 1858.

=== Aftermath ===
British captured 97 villages of Barkagarh estate. They demolished Satranji Garh and Hatiagarh fort. They confiscated all properties of Viswanath Shahdeo.

The wife of Viswanath Shahdeo Baneswari Kunwar fled to forest of Rani Khorha in Gumla district with her one-year son Kapil Nath Shahdeo and trusted individuals. She knew that British can kill her and her son. She lived 12 years in exile in Khora village. After 12 year, Baneswari Kunwar demanded return of property of Barkagarh estate by forwarding her son. But British stated that the Barkagarh estate run by council created by British which run estate of Jagirdar, Jamindar who have no inheritors and it will continue. But they agreed to pay Rani Baneswari Kunwar Rs.30 per month from tax collected by Barkagarh property.

== Commemoration ==
A statue of Thakur Viswanath Shahdeo is installed in Ranchi and every year on his birth anniversary, people gather to tribute him.
