= Udai Pratap Nath Shah Deo =

- Maharaja
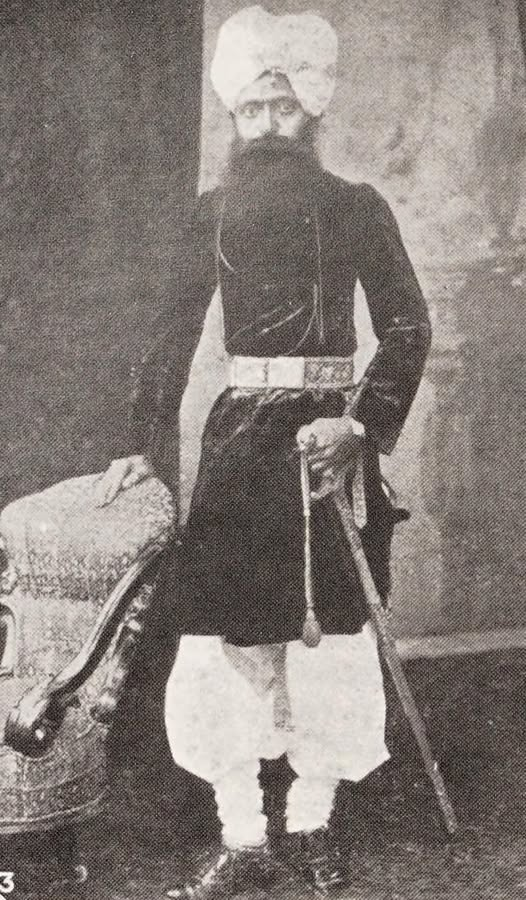
- Photograph of Maharaja Shah Deo

61st Nagvanshi king
- Reign: 1869–1950
- Coronation: 1872
- Predecessor: Jagannath Shah Deo
- Successor: Lal Chintamani Sharan Nath Shahdeo
- Born: 23 March 1866; Bharno, Chota Nagpur Division, Bengal Presidency
- Died: 21 September 1950 (aged 84); Ratu, Ranchi, Bihar (now Jharkhand)
- Spouse: Maharani Mohan Kumari (m.1881, died.1905); Saudamani Devi
- Issue: Neeladhri Nath Shah Deo; Yugal Kishore Nath Shah Deo; Braj Kishore Nath Shah Deo; Nand Kishore Nath Shah Deo; Rameshwar Nath Shahdeo; Asheshwar Nath Shah Deo; Raj Kishore Nath Shah Deo; Ghanshyam Devi; Jai Kishore Nath Shahdeo
- Dynasty: Nagvanshi
- Religion: Hinduism

Udai Pratap Nath Shahdeo (23 March 1866 – 21 September 1950), was the Maharaja of Chotanagpur Zamindari estate. He donated large tracts of land to build infrastructure of Ranchi city. He built the Ratu Palace in Ranchi in 1901. He was conferred the Kaiser-i-Hind Medal for public services. He reigned for 81 years, and 74 days, the longest-reigning Indian monarch, the longest-reigning Princely State ruler and third longest verifiable reign of any monarch in history.

== Early life ==
Deo was born on 23 March 1866 in Bharno. The king Jagannath Shah Deo died in 1869. As mentioned in Mangobinda Banargee's book "Historical Outline of Pre-British Chotanagpur", he was the nephew of Maharaja Jagannath Shah Deo. As Maharaja Jagannath Shah Deo had no sons, Udai Pratap Shah Deo succeeded to the throne after several court cases as other relatives of Maharaja claimed to be entitled to become king. Then the queen of King Jagannath Shah Deo, Luchun Kunwar shifted from Bharno to Ratu in 1879 and a palace was built in 1975.

== Personal life ==
Deo married Rajkumari Mohan Kumari, daughter of Maharaja Udit Narayan Singh Deo, Raja of Saraikela State, in 1881. Rajkumari Mohan Kumari died in 1905. His second marriage was to Saudamani Devi, daughter of Raja Ram Kanhai Singh of Barabhum Estate. He had nine sons and two daughters.

== Reign ==
King Udai Pratap Nath Shah Deo donated large tracts of the land in Ranchi to develop its infrastructure. He donated land for building Ranchi University, G.E.L church, Gossner College, Ranchi Club, Pepe compound and other institutions. He donated 320 acres of land to G.E.L. Church and 17 acres of land for the construction of Ranchi Club. Ten thousand acres of land of McCluskieganj was built on his land.

He built Ratu Palace in Ratu. The construction of Palace started in 1899 and completed in 1901. The Palace has 103 rooms and spread over 22 acres. It was constructed by British company of Kolkata and designed after Buckingham Palace in Westminster, London.

== Death ==
He died in 1950. He was succeeded by his great-grandson, Lal Chintamani Sharan Nath Shahdeo.
