= Edward Tuite Dalton =

Edward Tuite Dalton CSI (1815 - 1880) was a British soldier and anthropologist. He was posted in Assam, then became commissioner of Chota Nagpur Division. He was posted in Chotanagpur for two decades. Later he became major general of Bengal Lancer. He commanded both European and native people during the sepoy mutiny of 1857. Dalton, along with justice Campbell, Herbert Hope Risley, John-Baptist Hoffmann and P.O.Bidding initiated ethnographic studies in Chotanagpur. His work Descriptive Ethnology of Bengal formed a part of the Census in British India in 1872.

== Early life ==
He was born in Ireland in 1815. His father was a music composer. His maternal grandfather, Sir John Andrew Stevenson, was also a music composer. His father died in 1821. Then his mother, Olivia, married Thomas Taylour in 1822. His brother's name was Gustavus and his sister's Adelaide. His mother died in 1834. Then Thomas married the widowed Frances in 1853. Edward studied at Horrow School. Edward remained a Bachelor throughout his life and never married.

== Career ==
=== Assam ===
After education, Edward joined the East India Company and arrived in India on 12 November 1835 at the age of 20. He worked for 39 years and resigned his commission on 18 April 1875. He first was commissioned at Dibrugarh in Assam from 1838 to 1841. He had proficiency in Bengali and Assamese and cleared the exam in these languages. The territory of Assam came under British control in 1826 after defeating the Burmese in the Anglo-Burmese Wars. The Northeast was inhabited by numerous tribes such as the Naga, Khamtis, Mishing, who did not hesitate to raid and pillage the towns of East India company and tea gardens. In 1835, a military base was destroyed by the Kopachor tribe in Balipara in Sonitpur of Assam. Later, in Sadia, Khampti and Singhpo tribe killed a political agent and 80 soldiers in 1839. He spent eighteen years in the first Assam light infantry, which was raised in 1817 in Cuttack, Odisha. In 1858, two French missionaries, Nicholas Michael Kirck and Bourry, were killed by Mishmi villagers with their chief Kaieesha in Rima, Tibet, who were travelling to Tibet for their missionary activities. Edward was ordered to carry out an expedition against the Mishmi tribe from Dibrugarh. The British forces arrived at the villages. Edward sent Lieutenant Eden with a band of soldiers and in the fight, three sons of Kaieesha were killed. Their chief Kaieesha was arrested and executed in Dibrugarh.

=== Chota Nagpur ===
Later, he was posted to Ranchi in 1857 as commissioner of Chota Nagpur Division with the rank of Captain. During 1857, a mutiny of sepoys had occurred. The revolt in Chotanagpur began with the revolt of the Danapur in Patna. Then it spread to Ramgarh battalion with the headquarters at Hazaribagh. Then to Purulia in West Bengal and Chaibasa. In Singhbhum district, the king of Porahat, Raja Arjun Singh, aided by kol (Hos), declared war on the king of the Saraikela and Kharsawan, the allies of the East India Company. In September, the Sepoys of Chaibasa plundered the treasury. In Palamu, the Chero and Bhogta revolted. Lieutenant Graham went to subdue the mutineers of Hazaribagh but his troops also revolted and did not follow the orders of Graham. They arrived in Ranchi at night. The sepoy of head quarter were not ready to repel the mutineers. So, on 2 August 1857, Edward, other British officers and a few soldiers left for Hazaribagh. After they left, the mutineers burnt down and destroyed the British headquarters, buildings and churches. But they spared the house of Edward. They also took his four personal elephants. On the next day, Edward reached Hazaribagh but large numbers of insurgents forced him to abandon the military station in Hazaribagh. During this time, the king of Ramgarh, Jagannath Shahi, helped him and provided his fifty Soldiers for protection. The king of Seraikela, Kharsawan and several other zamindar and tribal chiefs provided assistants to him in the Rebellion of 1857. While Edward requested reinforcement in Chotanagpur, East India Company was more concerned with mutiny in North India in Uttar Pradesh and Bihar with large numbers of soldiers. With regiments in North India in mutiny, the British mobilized the Madras Regiment from South India, which arrived in Kolkata on 5 August 1857 and while others marched to Chotanagpur from Cuttuck. The detachment reinforced Edward in Bagodar and occupied Hazaribagh, then Doronda in Ranchi, which was declared part of the Mughal Empire by rebel Soldiers. On 2 October 1857, 300 Soldiers defeated 3000 rebel mutineers, which is known as the Battle of Chatra.

In January 1858, Edward marched to quell Chero and Bhogta, who had attacked landlords and destroyed jails, courthouses, government buildings and occupied Palamu Forts. He failed to capture the leaders of the Rebellion due to difficult terrain. He founded the city of Daltonganj, now known as Medininagar. In Singhbhum, the kols had declared Arjun Singh as their king and revolted against colonial rule and burnt down the government buildings. The British forces defeated kols in a pitted battle and Arjun Singh surrendered, but Kol continued their insurgency till 1861.

In 1859, the East India Company desolated. For war service, Edward received a gallantry award and was promoted to the rank of Major. Then he authored the book Descriptive Ethnology of Bengal in which he gave descriptions of people of the Bengal Presidency. He started to work on Ethnology of Bengal in 1866 with the rank of Colonel at the age of 51. It was a catalogue entrusted by The Asiatic Society of Bengal for an exhibition of the primitive tribes of British India in Kolkata, which was the brainchild of Sir Joseph Fayrer. But the exhibition ended due to logistical, political and health issues about ferrying the tribals of Assam to Kolkata. The exhibition was scrapped but the Asiatic Society of Bengal and the British Indian Government were interested in scientific studies of tribals. Edwards completed the book after six years in 1872, residing in Ranchi.

=== Helping pastor Fedrick Batsch ===
In 1868, Edward supported pastor Fedrick Batsch, who constructed the Gossner Evangelical Lutheran Church, Ranchi in 1855 and accumulated a congregation of 10,000 tribal followers. Between 1866 and 1872, under investigation by Reverend Ansorge, he was wrongfully accused of crimes and ex-communicated. He tried to reconcile Batsch with Reverend Ansorge but was in vain. After the ex-communication of Batsch with four other pastors in 1871, the Bishop Robert Milman inducted them into the Anglican fold. Edward donated 500 pounds for the construction of St.Paul's Church in 1871 in Ranchi.

=== Companion of the Order of the Star of India ===
In 1869, he was knighted with the Companion of the Order of the Star of India for his service. In 1875, with the rank of Lieutenant Colonel, he resigned as the commissioner of Chotanagpur at the age of 60.

== Death ==
He died on 30 December 1880 in Cannes, France due to a cardiac arrest at the age of 65.
