= Lal Chintamani Sharan Nath Shahdeo =

Indian politician

- Maharaja

62nd Nagvanshi king
- Reign: 1950 – 1952
- Predecessor: Udai Pratap Nath Shah Deo
- Born: 14 December 1931; Ratu, Ranchi, Chota Nagpur Division, Bihar and Orissa Province
- Died: 10 July 2014 (aged 82); Ranchi, Jharkhand
- Spouse: Maharani Prem Manjari Devi (m.1952)
- Issue: Madhuri Manjari Devi; Kalpana Kumari Devi; Tripti Manjari Devi; Gayatri Manjari Devi; Gopal Sharan Nath Shahdeo
- Dynasty: Nagvanshi
- Father: Kali Sharan Nath Shah Deo
- Mother: Baidehi Devi
- Religion: Hinduism

Sri Lal Chintamani Sharan Nath Shahdeo (14 December 1931 – 10 July 2014) was the last ruling Nagvanshi Maharaja of the Chotanagpur Zamindari estate and a politician.

== Early life ==
Lal Chintamani Sharan Nath Shahdeo was born in the royal family of the Nagvanshi dynasty in 1931. He studied at Raj Kumar College in Raipur. In 1950, he succeeded his great grandfather Udai Pratap Nath Shah Deo as the maharaj of the Chotanagpur zamindari estate. He married Prem Manjari Devi, daughter of Raja Bhanuganga Tribhuban Deb, Raja of Bamra, and his wife, Rani Jyoti Manjari Devi, in 1952. He had one son and four daughters. He was the last ruling maharaja till Zamindari was abolished in 1952.

== Career ==
He was an Independent MLA from the Ranchi Assembly constituency in 1957 and was the youngest MLA in the Bihar Vidhan Sabha. Later, he was elected to the Bihar Legislative Council as a Congress candidate.

He was a member of the South Eastern Railway Board, a life senator of Ranchi University, and the chairman of the Small Scale Industrial Board (Bihar). He helped in the establishment of many educational, health, and government institutions by donating lands and lending financial support. Organisations thus established include Kartik Oraon College in Gumla, Maharani Prem Manjari Devi College for girls in Ratu, Adivasi Bal Vikas Vidyalaya in Ratu, Maharani Prem Manjari Devi Super Speciality Hospital in Ratu, and Ratu police station, among others.

== Death ==
He died in Ranchi on 9 July 2014 following a brief illness.
