= Dripnath Shah =

Nagvanshi king

- Raja
- Reign: c.1762-1790 CE
- Predecessor: Maninath Shah
- Successor: Deonath Shah
- Born: Palkot
- Died: 1790; Palkot
- Dynasty: Nagvanshi
- Religion: Hinduism

Dripnath Shah was a Nagvanshi king in the 18th century. His capital was at Palkot. He succeeded Maninath Shah and ruled from 1762 to 1790 CE. He became a vassal of the East India Company in 1771. He submitted list of Nagvanshi kings to Governor general of India in 1787.

== Reign ==
=== Attempt to Subjugate Kolhan ===
Dripnath Shah succeeded Maninath Shah who conquered the territory of Tamar, Silli, Barwe after subjecting their chief. During the reign of Dripnath Shah, the Nagvanshi were independent. The Mughals became weak and incapable of asserting their authority over Chotanagpur. He twice attempted to subjugate Kolhan but failed. In May 1770, he and the King of Tamar attempted to subjugate Lakra Kol (Ho) of Kolhan but failed and hundreds of their men were killed. Lakra Kol pursued the Nagvanshi forces. They burned down several villages and several villages were depopulated. The southern part of the Nagvanshi kingdom was in constant trouble due to pillaging by Lakra Kols.

=== Pillages by Ramgarh Raj ===
Mukund Singh of Ramgarh carried out several pillages and looting in Nagvanshi territory as an excuse to collect revenue, as in the past the Nagvanshi were giving tribute to the Mughals through Ramgarh Raj.

=== Vassal of East India Company ===
After the Battle of Buxar, East India Company got rights to collect taxes from Bihar and Bengal territory. Dripnath Shah declined to pay tax to East India Company when Company official met him in Palkot. Later Dripnath Shah decided to become a vassal of the East India Company; when he came to know about Captain Camac's activity who was successful in subjugating the Chero ruler of Palamu. In 1771, after the fall of the Palamu Forts, Dripnath Shah met Captain Camac and wished to become a vassal of the East India Company and agreed to six thousand rupees as tribute and six thousand nazrana annually, the same amount of tax that was paid to Mughal. He formalised it with exchanging his headgear with the cap of Captain Camac. Captain Camac expected the help of Dripnath Shah in an expedition against Jainath Singh of Palamu, Mukund Singh the ruler of Ramgarh, and the Marathas.

Due to high amount of taxes Mukund Singh of Ramgarh was not ready to accept suzerainty of East India company. He made alliance with Maratha. Capitain Jacob declared Tej Singh Thakurai as King of Ramgarh and gave him leadership to lead the battle. His forces, forces of Nagvanshis and Palamu attacked Ramgarh but were defeated by joint forces of Maratha and Ramgarh. Later Captain Jacob and Tej Singh Thakurai attacked Ramgarh with large company forces and Mukund Singh surrendered without any resistance as he was not able to get help from Maratha forces. Then Tej Singh Thakurai became new king of Ramgarh.

=== Maratha Invasion ===
Mukund Singh joined with the Marathas and planted a claimant on the Nagvanshi throne, Nana Shah, who claimed himself the true heir of the Nagvanshi throne in an effort to dethrone Dripnath Shah. Captain Carter wrote a letter to Captain Camac about this matter. But Captain Camac supported Dripnath Shah understanding the conspiracy against Dripnath Shah. In February 1772, the Marathas invaded Dripnath Shah's territory with 1,200 horsemen and 4,000 plunderers and plundered the villages and also killed many people. The king of Tori, who was a vassal of Nagvanshi, sided with the Marathas and drove away Dripnath Shah's men. Dripnath Shah confined himself in Palkot. The Marathas demanded revenue from Dripnath Shah and setting of cantonment in his territory. The Patna council decided to assist Dripnath Shah against the Marathas on 20 July 1772. In September 1772, the Marathas camped near Palkot. They attacked the camp of Lt. Thomas Scott but they were defeated and driven away.

=== Rule under East India Company ===
Dripnath Shah had not paid taxes. East India company forces attacked Nagvanshi in 1773. Dripnath Shah paid Rs. 15000 and continue to rule under British. British gave responsibilities to catch robers and theft in Chotanagpur to him. In 1780, captain Champell replaced Captain Camac. His court held in Chatra and Ramgarh Battalion was established with its headquarter in Hazaribagh. The jurisdiction of captain Champell was spread in the area of Chatra, Palamu, Kunda, Kharagdiha, Panchet and Sherghati. In 1786, tribal revolted and it was suppressed with difficulty.
