= Raghunath Shah =

Nagvanshi king

Raghunath Sah
- Raja
- Reign: c. 1663-1690 CE
- Predecessor: Ram Shah
- Successor: Yadunath Shah
- Born: Navratangarh
- Died: Navratangarh
- Dynasty: Nagvanshi
- Father: Ram Sah
- Mother: Mukta Devi
- Religion: Hinduism

Raghunath Shah was a Gond king in the 17th century. He succeeded his father Ram Shah in 1663. His capital was at Navratangarh. He built several temples during his reign.

According to Lal Pradumn Singh, writer of the book Nagvansh (1951), Mughals invaded Khukhra during the reign of Raghunath Shah. Mughal officials were sent by Aurangzeb to attack Khukhra in his initial years. The invasion was strongly resisted which resulted in the death of Mughal officials. Later Raghunath Shah agreed to pay tax to Mughal.

He constructed several temples with the help of Maratha Guru Harinath, including Jagannath Temple in 1682, Madan Mohan Temple of Boreya and Radha Balabh Temple in 1687. Raghunath Shah included the Nath middle name in his name in the honour of his guru Harinath. Raghunath Shah's name is featured in a temple inscription in Chutia in Ranchi district as the fiftieth descendant of Raja Phani Mukut Rai. The sanskrit inscription on the wall of the Madan Mohan temple in Boreya in Ranchi shows that it was constructed during the reign of Raghunath Shah in Samvat 1722 (1665 CE). He was also a poet and wrote several poems in the Nagpuri language. He is the first known poet of the Nagpuri language. He was a worshiper of Lord Krishna. His poetry reflect Vaishnav tradition.

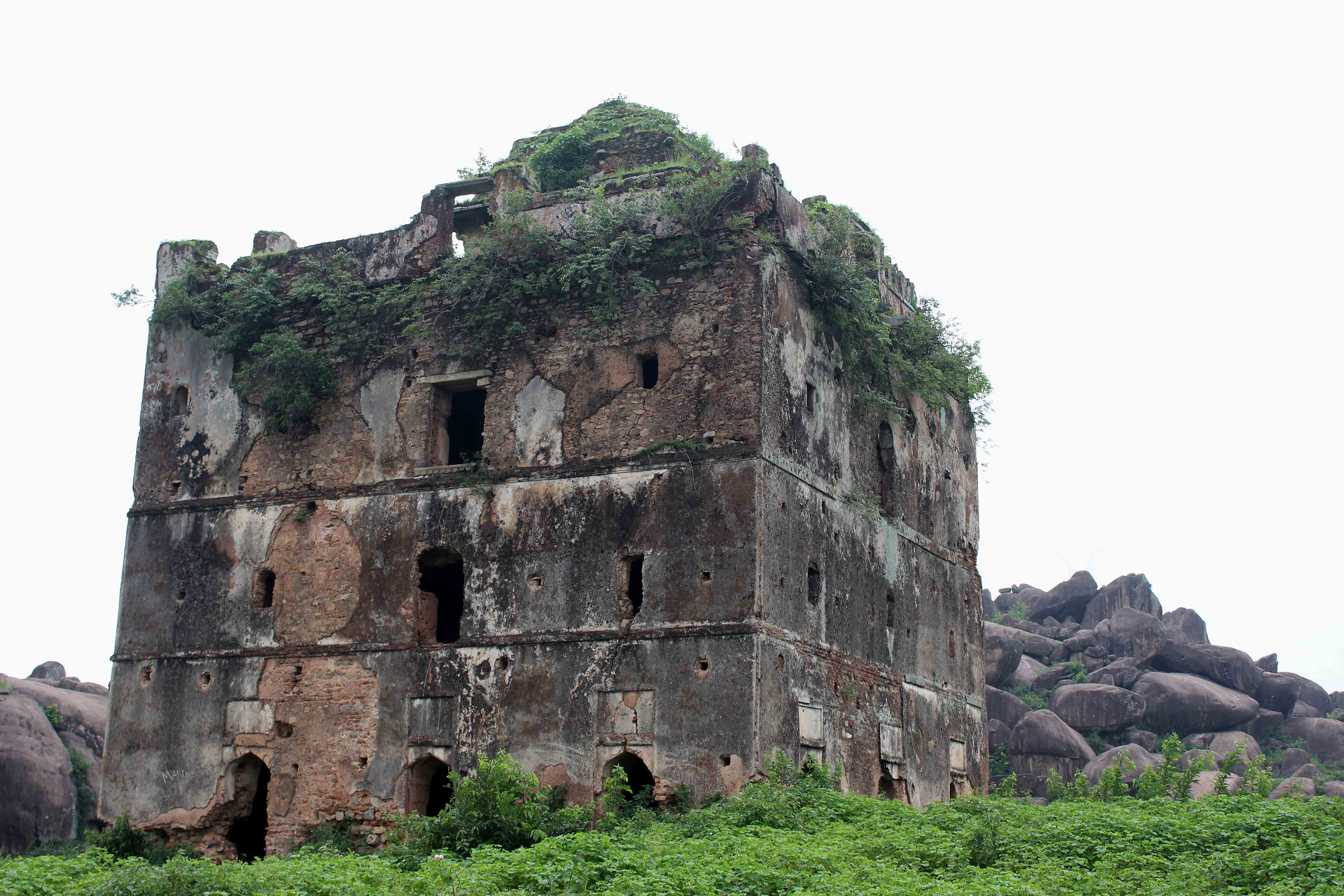
Navratangarh fort

During his reign, Medini Ray invaded Navratangarh. He plundered it and took away the gate of Navratangarh and put it into Palamu fort known as Nagpuri gate.
