= Hatia =

- Neighbourhood in Ranchi
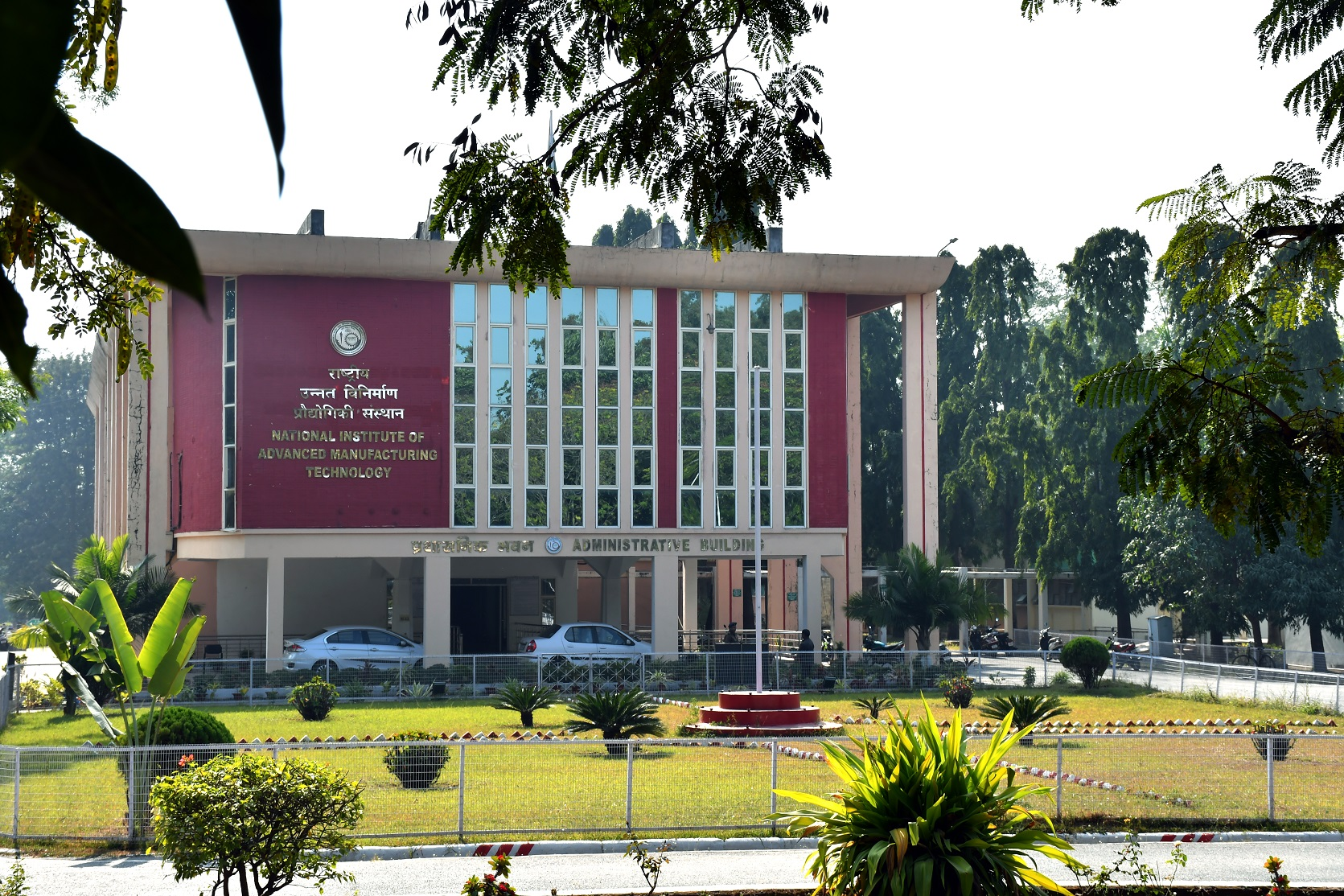
- National Institute of Advanced Manufacturing Technology (Formerly NIFFT), Ranchi

- Location in Jharkhand, India Hatia (India)
- Coordinates: 23.2865°N 85.3058°E
- Country: India
- State: Jharkhand
- District: Ranchi
- Founder: Ani Nath Shahdeo
- Elevation: 641 m (2,103 ft)

Languages
  - Official: Hindi, Urdu
- Time zone: UTC+5:30 (IST)
- Vehicle registration: JH

Hatia is a suburb neighbourhood of Ranchi in Jharkhand, India. Hatia railway station is the railway station serving the capital city of Ranchi in the Ranchi district in the Indian state of Jharkhand.

== Etymology ==
The name "Hatia" derive from "Hat" which means "market." The Hat was established by King of Barkagarh Ani Nath Shahdeo.

== Geography ==
Cities, towns and locations in Ranchi district in South Chotanagpur Division
M: municipality, CT: census town, R: rural/ urban centre, N: neighbourhood, T: tourist centre, D: dam, H: historical/ religious centre
Owing to space constraints in the small map, the actual locations in a larger map may vary slightly

=== Location ===
Hatia is located at 23.2865°N 85.3058°E. It has an average elevation of 641 m (2,103 ft).

It is adjacent to Ranchi, the capital of Jharkhand. Hatia developed as a suburb of Ranchi. Away from the rush in the main city, this part of Ranchi is comparatively quiet and calm. With HEC developing a huge infrastructural set up in the area, Hatia is one of the largest and most well-maintained dwelling destinations in Ranchi.

=== Area overview ===
The map alongside shows a part of the Ranchi plateau, most of it at an average elevation of 2,140 feet above sea level. Only a small part in the north-eastern part of the district is the lower Ranchi plateau, spread over Silli, Rahe, Sonahatu and Tamar CD blocks, at an elevation of 500 to 1,000 feet above sea level. There is a 16 km long ridge south-west of Ranchi. There are isolated hills in the central plateau. The principal river of the district, the Subarnarekha, originates near Ratu, flows in an easterly direction and descends from the plateau, with a drop of about 300 feet at Hundru Falls. Subarnarekha and other important rivers are marked on the map. The forested area is shaded in the map. A major part of the North Karanpura Area and some fringe areas of the Piparwar Area of the Central Coalfields Limited, both located in the North Karanpura Coalfield, are in Ranchi district. There has been extensive industrial activity in Ranchi district, since independence. Ranchi district is first in the state in terms of population. 8.83% of the total population of the state lives in this district - 56.9% is rural population and 43.1% is urban population.

Note: The map alongside presents some of the notable locations in the district. All places marked in the map are linked in the larger full screen map.

== Economy ==
Heavy Engineering Corporation, one of the largest engineering company and India's first heavy machinery company in India, is situated in Hatia.

== Transport ==
Hatia railway station, station code HTE, is the railway station serving the capital city of Ranchi in the Ranchi district in the Indian state of Jharkhand. It serves as the terminal station of several trains, and many trains pass through it.

== Education ==
One of the premier technical institutions, National Institute of Advanced Manufacturing Technology is situated in Hatia.
