= Navratangarh =

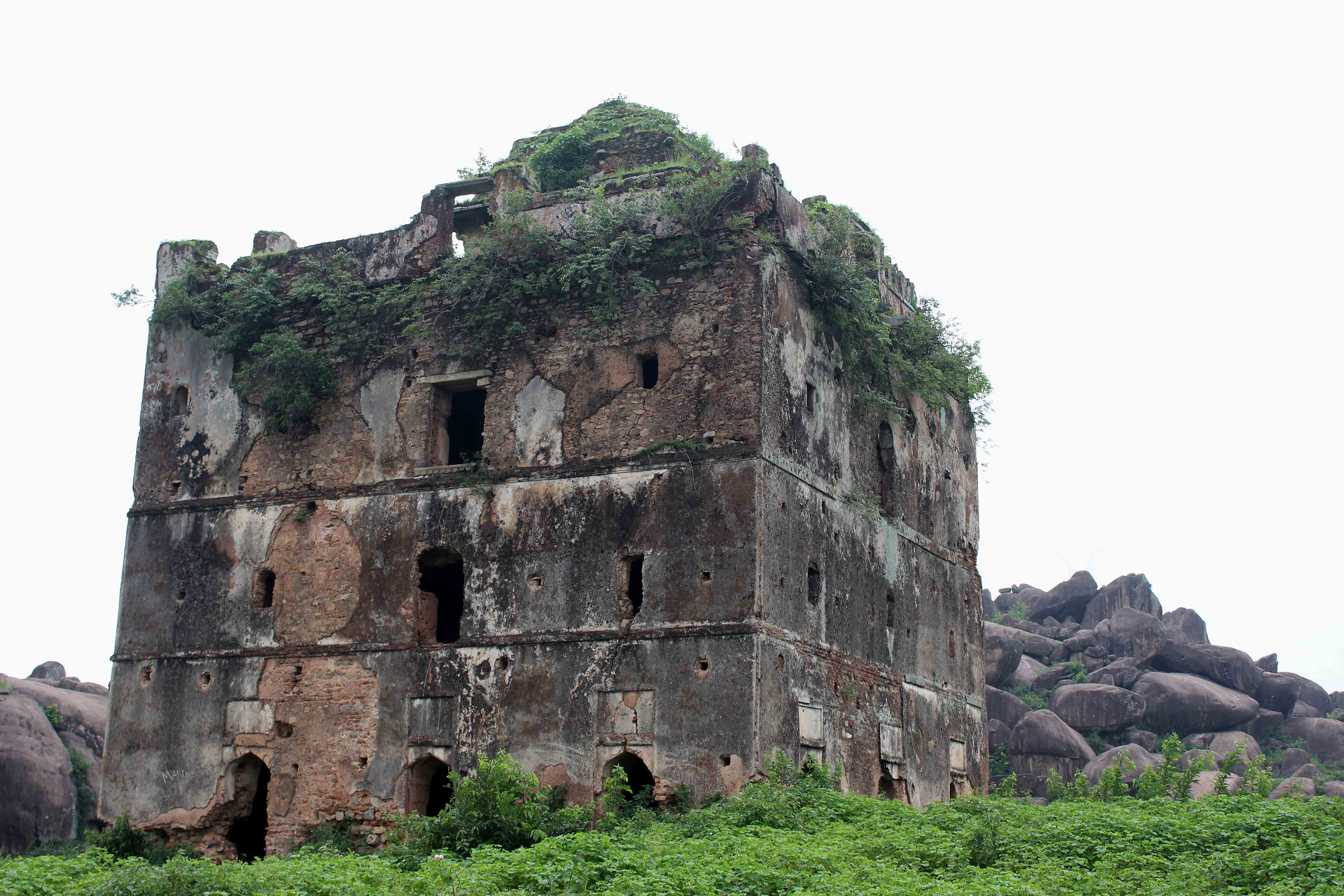
- Ruined Navratangarh fort

- Location in Jharkhand, India, Asia Navratangarh (India)
- 23.10993°N 84.78367°E
- Location: Sisai, Gumla, Jharkhand, India

History
- Founded: Durjan Shah
- Built: c. 1636 – c. 1639

Site notes
- Area: 11 ha (27 acres)

Monument of National Importance
- Official name: Navaratngarh
- Type: Forts and temples
- Reference no.: N-JH-12
- Collection circle: Jharkhand

Navratangarh (Doisagarh) was one of the capitals of the Nagvanshi dynasty, who ruled parts of what is now the state of Jharkhand, India. It is located in Sisai block of Gumla district. It is said that king Durjan Shah shifted his capital from Khukhragarh to Navratangarh. He constructed the fort between 1636 and 1639. The palace was a five-storeyed structure with its "water-gate" and garh-khai (moat) arrangement. It has a kiaclmy (court), a treasury house and a prison-cell with its underground dungeon. It was declared national heritage in 2009.

== Overview ==
Cities, towns and locations in Gumla district in South Chotanagpur Division
M: municipality, CT: census town, R: rural/ urban centre, H: historical/ religious centre, T: tourist centre, B: Bauxite mining centre

The Navratragarh fort is located in Sisai block of Gumla district. It is located in around 30 km from Gumla and 75 km from Ranchi.

== History ==
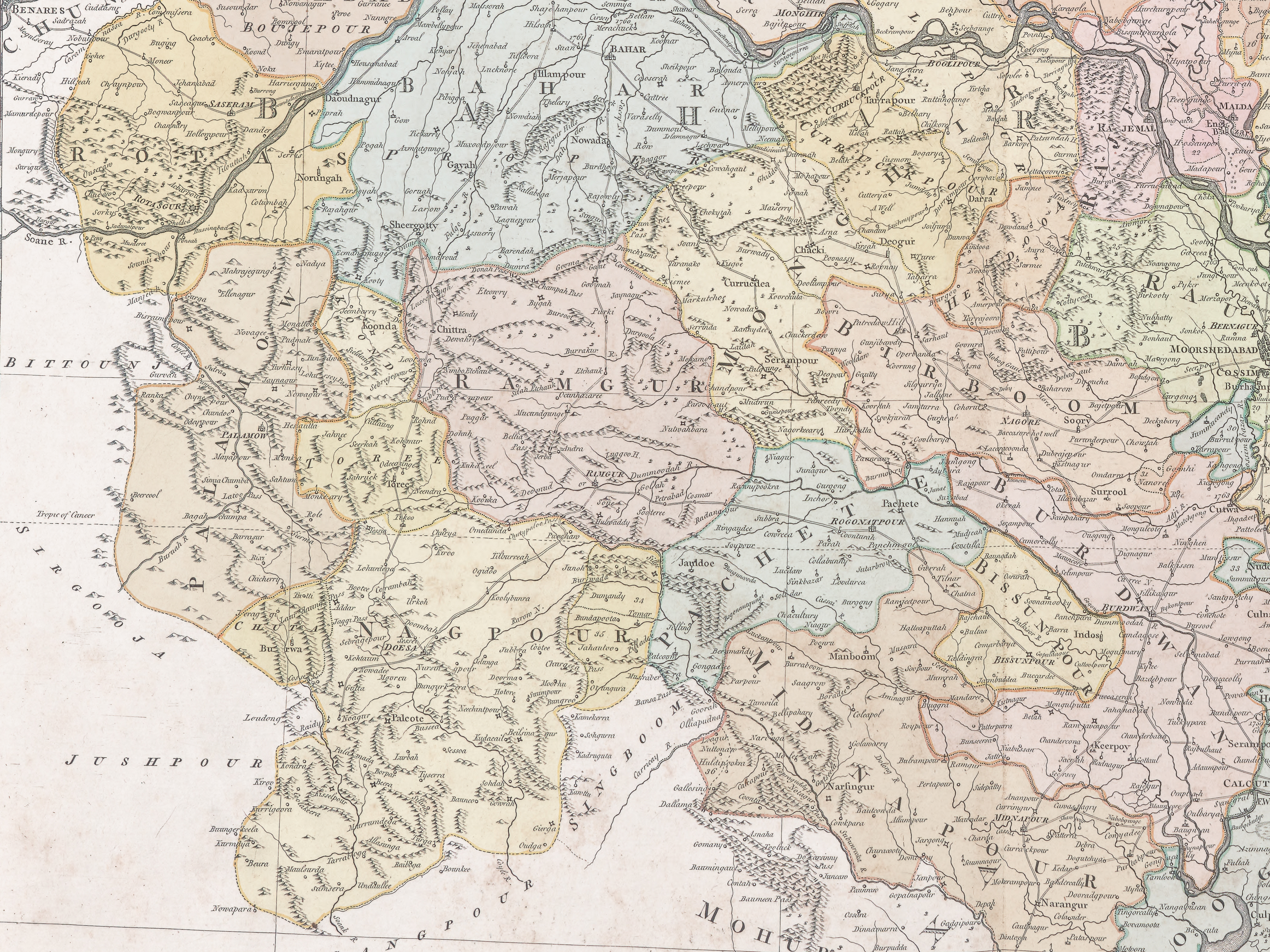
1779 map by Rennell showing Navratangarh (labelled as DOESA) and Palkot (Palcote) in Chota Nagpur.

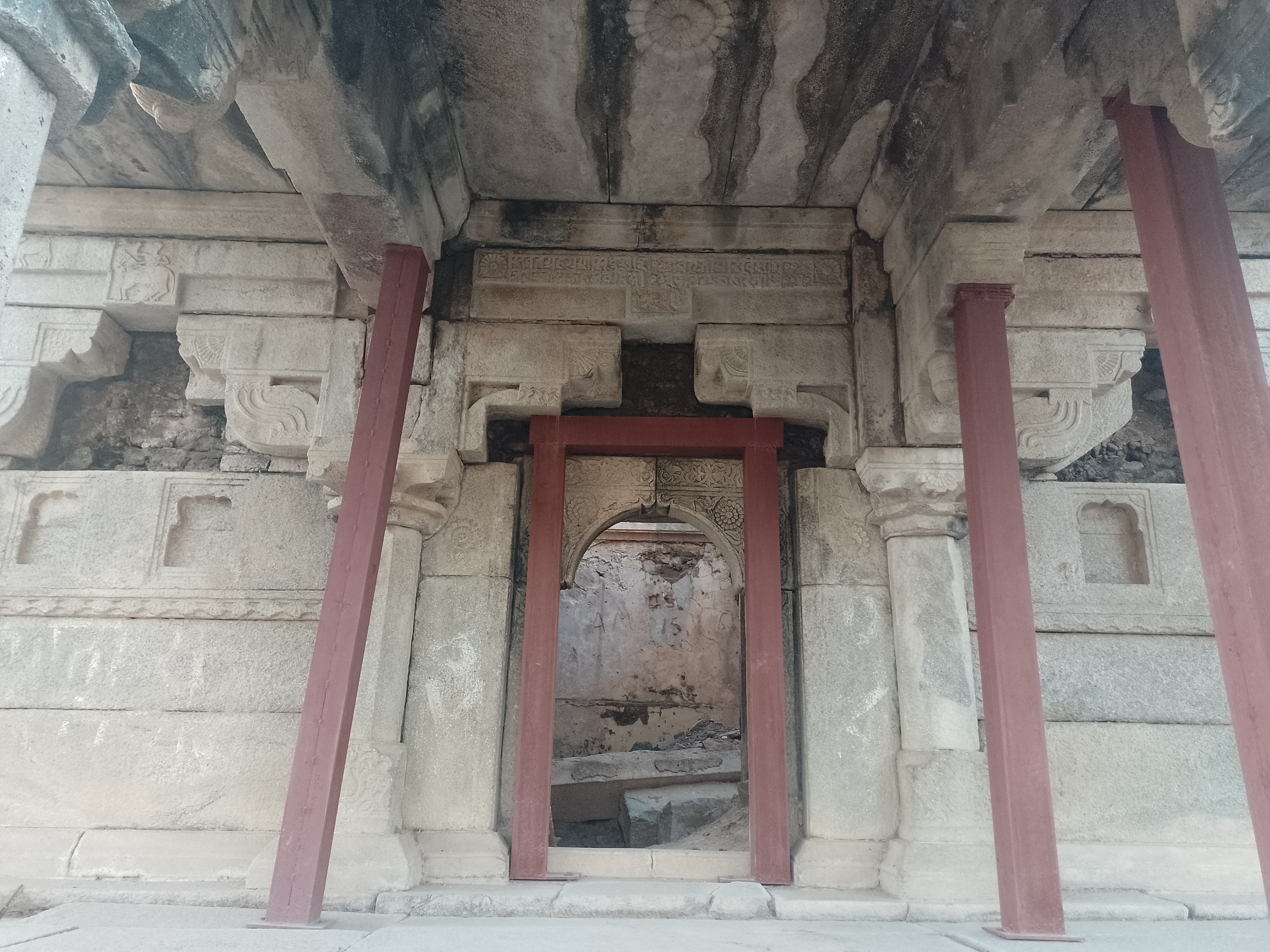
Inscription at temple in Navratangarh

It is said that king Durjan Shah shifted his capital from Khukhragarh to Navratangarh. He constructed the fort between 1636 and 1639 CE. After his release from Mughal captivity, the Raja decided to build the fort. Navratangarh was in a strategic location as it was surrounded by forests, hills and rivers. King Ram Shah built Kapilnath Temple in 1643. He succeeded by Raghunath Shah. He also built several temples. Yadunath Shah shifted capital to Palkot due to Mughal invasion.
