= Ram Shah (king) =

Nagvanshi king

- Raja
- Reign: c. 1640-1663 CE
- Predecessor: Durjan Shah
- Successor: Raghunath Shah
- Born: Khukhragarh
- Died: Navratangarh
- Spouse: Mukta Devi
- Issue: Raghunath Shah; Ani Nath Shahdeo
- Dynasty: Nagvanshi
- Religion: Hinduism

Ram Shah was Nagvanshi king in the 17th century. He succeed his brother Durjan Shah and ruled from 1640 to 1663 CE. Earlier their capital was at Khukhragarh, but later they shifted to Navratangarh. He was brother of king Durjan Shah.

According to a sanskrit inscription on the wall of Kapilnath Temple in Navratangarh, the temple was constructed in samvat 1700 (1643 CE) during reign of Ram Shah.

He attacked and fought a battle with the king of Rewa and pact was established in the end. Later his son, Ani Nath Shahdeo, married the daughter of the king of Rewa. According to Nagvanshavali, the king Nageswar attacked Khukhra. During his reign, there was battle between Jagannath, the king of Jayantgarh in Singhbhum and Ram Shah. Ram shah destroyed fort of Jayantgarh and around 2200 people died in battle. In the end, Jagannath made a pact with Ram Shah. Two sisters of Ram Shah married Jagannath.

He ruled until his death in 1663. He succeeded by his elder son Raghunath Shah.
