= Jagatpal Singh =

- Raja

Raja of Pithoria
- Reign: 19th century
- Predecessor: Jaimangal Singh
- Born: Pithoria, Ranchi district, Chota Nagpur Division, British India
- Died: Pithoria
- Father: Jaimangal Singh
- Religion: Hinduism

Jagatpal Singh was the king of Pithoria in the 19th century. He was an ally of the British East India Company. His father Jaimangal Singh and he made Pithoria a business and cultural centre. He helped the British in the suppression of the Rebellion of 1857 in Ranchi.

== Early life ==
He was son of King of Pithoria Jaimangal Singh. After his father he became king of Pithoria. He had a palace which spread in land of 30 acres with two storey building and 100 rooms. There was a temple of Shiva in the palace pond. He was a devotee of Shiva, and he also made Shiva temple near his palace. Also, people worship in the temple today. He had done many works for his subjects. He was popular among his subjects. But due to his support of British during Rebellion of 1857, he became an antagonist in history.

== Rebellion of 1857 ==
During 1857 rebellion, he helped British Captain Thomas Wilkinson. He employed his soldiers to check rebel Jamindar and their allies. He made garrison during rebellion which is located around 11 km north of Pithoria. Thakur Vishwanath Shahdeo and Surendra Nath Shahdeo attacked British in Pithoria but Jagatpal Singh protect British. After fight of several days, the rebel Jamindar and their allies lost battle. Thakur Viswanath Shahdeo caught and hanged in a tree near Ranchi school on 16 April 1858 due to his statement. Several other Rebel like Pandey Ganpat Rai also hanged due to his statement. His palace is now in ruins and thunderstorms fall in rainy season.
