= Pandey Ganpat Rai =

Leader in the Indian Rebellion of 1857

- Born: 17 January 1809; Lohardaga district, Bihar (now in Jharkhand)
- Died: 21 April 1858 (aged 49); Ramgarh
- Occupations: Diwan and Commander
- Known for: Freedom struggle in Indian Rebellion of 1857
- Parents: Ram Kishun Rai (father); Sumitra Devi (mother)

Pandey Ganpat Rai (1809-1858) was a rebel leader in the Indian Rebellion of 1857 and a chieftain in Lohardaga district of Bihar (now a part of Jharkhand).

== Early life ==
He was born on January 17, 1809, in Bhaunro, Lohardaga district, Bihar (now a part of Jharkhand). He was born in a Srivastava Zamindar family. His family ancestrally belonged to the Pandey Al(subdivision of Srivastavas), which is a prestigious lineage of Srivastava Zamindars of Eastern Uttar Pradesh. His father was Ramkishun Rai and Mother Sumitra Devi. His uncle Sadashiv Rai was Dewan of Nagvanshi Maharaja Jagannath Shah Deo. After the death of his uncle Maharaja appointed him as Dewan after seeing his capability.

== Pre-rebellion ==
Pandey Ganpat Rai was zamindar of Bhunra and served as the diwan to the Maharaja of Chota Nagpur who belonged to the Nagvanshi dynasty. He was initially sceptical of the British presence in the region and believed them to be interfering in his work. Ganpat Rai eventually became opposed to British colonial rule and tried to convince Maharaja Jagannath Shahdeo to united with him against the British but not succeed. His refusal to work with British officials led to him being dismissed from his role and in response he started to organise like-minded people to help him gain revenge.

He formed an alliance with fellow chieftains including Thakur Vishwanath Shahdeo and Nadir Ali Khan before being subsequently hanged by the British authorities.

== 1857 rebellion ==
As the rebellion spread throughout the various regions of North India, both Ganpat Rai and Vishwanath Shahdeo decided to assume leadership with Ganpat Rai being named as the commander-in-chief. They assembled a force of around 1,100 men. They managed to recruit mutinying sepoys from Ramgarh and proceeded to throw the region into a state of anarchy causing many British officials to flee the area. Their end goal was to proceed through Palamu district and reach Arrah where they would join their forces with Kunwar Singh who was the leader of the rebel forces in North Bihar. Much of their initial success was due to the terrain of the region which was mainly forested and hilly allowing the rebels to escape easily. One of these conflicts later became known as the Battle of Chatra, in which British troops, assisted by Sikh sepoys, besieged rebels in the village of Chatra with each side suffering heavy losses before the British eventually stormed and captured the village.

During this period, he declared that the British Raj had supposedly come to an end. In the meantime, the British forces led by Colonel Edward Tuite Dalton were assisted by loyal zamindars including those of Ramgarh Raj.

However, as they attempted to march towards Kunwar Singh's position, they were intercepted by a battalion led by Major English on the 2nd of October. In the ensuing battle both rebel leaders were defeated and retreated. Eventually after numerous skirmishes and battles with both local zamindars and the British, the authorities had managed to create a robust intelligence network and they were captured in March 1858 and then hanged on the 21st of April that same year.

== Legacy ==
The governments of Jharkhand and Bihar have made many efforts to preserve the memory of Pandey Ganpat Rai. In 2012, the Jharkhand government organised the redevelopment of Pandey Ganpat Rai's village in Lohardaga district including the creation of new roads, a cultural centre and improved electric supplies.

In 2017, members of the Indian National Congress also paid tribute to the rebel leader and referred to him by the title of Shaheed which means martyr.

There is also a memorial badminton championship named after Ganpat Rai called the Pandey Ganpat Ray Memorial Badminton Championship which was inaugurated in 2018.
