= Battle of Chatra =

- Part of Indian Rebellion of 1857
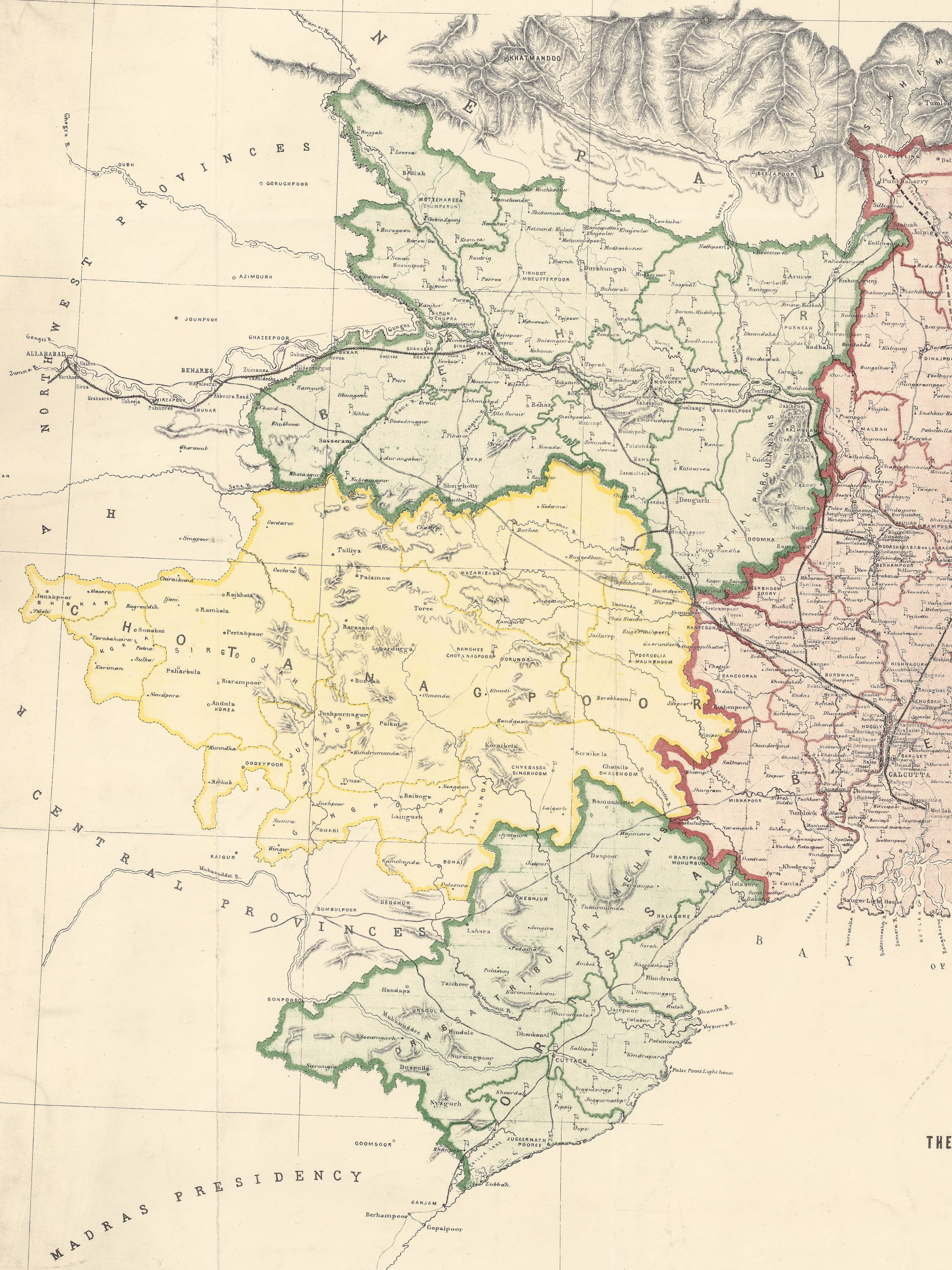
- Chota Nagpur Division of the Bengal Presidency, 1872
Date	2 October 1857
Location	Chatra, Chota Nagpur Division (modern-day Jharkhand)
Result	British victory

Belligerents
East India Company; United Kingdom	Mutinying sepoys and rebel zamindars

Commanders and leaders
Major English; Major Smith; Lt. Earle	Thakur Vishwanath Shahdeo; Pandey Ganpat Rai; Madhav Singh

Strength
200	3000 rebels

Casualties and losses
56 in total. 46 Europeans and 10 Sikhs.	150

The Battle of Chatra was a conflict that took place during the Indian Rebellion of 1857 between the East India Company and the mutinying sepoys who were allied certain local zamindars. The rebels had amassed a force of 3000 men and had taken the town of Chatra which is located in the Chota Nagpur Division. It was a crucial and bloody military engagement fought on October 2, 1857, during the Indian Rebellion of 1857. It took place at Phansi Hari Talab in Chatra (modern-day Jharkhand) between the mutinous sepoys of the British East India Company's Ramgarh Battalion and the British counter-insurgency forces.

== Background ==
Two companies of the Ramgarh Battalion which were stationed in Hazaribagh revolted against the British authorities as did other troops all across North India such as in Meerut. These sepoys fell under the leadership of local rebel leaders including Pandey Ganpat Rai and Thakur Vishwanath Shahdeo and formed a mukti vahini (people's army) and intended to overthrow the British authorities. The rebel force was planning to travel northwards to Rohtas where they would combine their forces with the rebel leader of North Bihar, Kunwar Singh.

== Battle ==
The various British forces were sent in pursuit of the rebels as they traveled northwards through Hazaribagh until they also reached Chatra. The rebels received word that a clash was inevitable and fortified themselves within the town and in the process were harassing, robbing and looting the local people which caused many of them to assist the British forces. This plunderous behaviour also left the rebels open to a sudden attack.

Major Smith drew a rough plan of the town and decided to attack from the South. The advanced guard located the main body of rebels and immediately a skirmish took place in the rice fields. As this progressed, various skirmishes also started to place throughout the town with both sides suffering heavy losses. In the end, the British forces started to attack the town from all flanks. The British took advantage of heavy tree cover on the outskirts of the town else they likely would have suffered even heavier losses. Two rebel leaders, Jai Mangal Pandey and Nadir Ali were captured and quickly hanged.

== Aftermath ==
Two of the major rebel leaders, Vishwanath Shahdeo and Ganpat Rai managed to escape and continued to harass the British forces before being captured in 1858 and hanged.
