= Durjan Shah =

Nagvanshi king

- Raja
- 1st Reign: ?-1615
- Predecessor: Bairisal
- 2nd Reign: 1627-1640
- Successor: Ram Shah
- Died: 1640; Navratangarh
- Dynasty: Nagvanshi
- Religion: Hinduism

Durjan Shah was a Nagvanshi king in the 17th century. He had built Navratangarh fort.

== Early life ==
He succeeded Bairisal. Immediately after accession to Nagvanshi throne, he threw away all allegiance to the Mughals.

== Mughal invasion and imprisonment ==
Because of the independent attitude of Durjan Shah, coupled with possibility of acquiring diamonds from Khukhra found in the river bed of Sankh, Jahangir ordered governor of Bihar Ibrahim Khan, an expedition against Durjan Shah in 1615. Durjan Shah sent some of his men to Ibrahim Khan and promised to pay some diamond and elephants but Khan could not agree to it. Before Durjan Shah could collect his kinsmen Ibrahim Khan invaded Khukhra with the help of guides. As it was a surprise attack, Durjan Shah was not able to do preparation to defend himself So he fled to the nearby hills with his family members. Durjan Shah was later found in cave with his family members. They were arrested and all the diamonds taken. Twenty three elephants also fell in the hand of Ibrahim Khan. Durjan Shah was taken to Patna and then he was sent to prison in Gwalior.

Mughal officials were collecting diamonds in river bed of Khokhra and sending it to Mughal court. Two diamonds were brought to Jahangir from some place. The Jeweller tested the diamonds, they declared the best among them to be impure and impure to be sound. Durjan Shah was recalled from prison to identify real diamonds. He pointed out flaw and proved himself right. He tied the diamonds to the end of horn of a ram and made it fight with another ram. While flaw diamond split other remain intact. Jahangir was so pleased that he released him. Durjan Shah begged that the other Raja who had been in the confinement of Gwalior fort should be released. He requested that his formal position to be restored to him. He agreed to paid annual tribute of Rs 6,000 and title of Shah was also conferred on him.

== Construction of Navratangarh fort ==
Durjan Shah was released from Mughal captivity in 1627 after twelve years of imprisonment. During the absence of Durjan Shah from Khokhra, one of the relatives of him had captured the throne of chieftaincy although the overall control of the region continued to be exercised by the imperial officers. The occupant of the chieftaincy developed hostility towards Mughals. As a result, Ahmed Beg Khan, the Nephew of Ibrahim Khan Fatah Jang and deputy governor of Orissa Subah, attacked the Khokhra in 1624. But Mughal could not mobilise effective army against him and could not remove him from the throne.

Durjan Shah came to Khokhra. He was compelled to fight to regain his lost position and succeeded in establishing himself in the throne. In fight, he was assisted by one of the rajas who had accompanied him from Gwalior. But disgusted by this internal strife some Nagvanshi family members left their home and migrated to distant places.

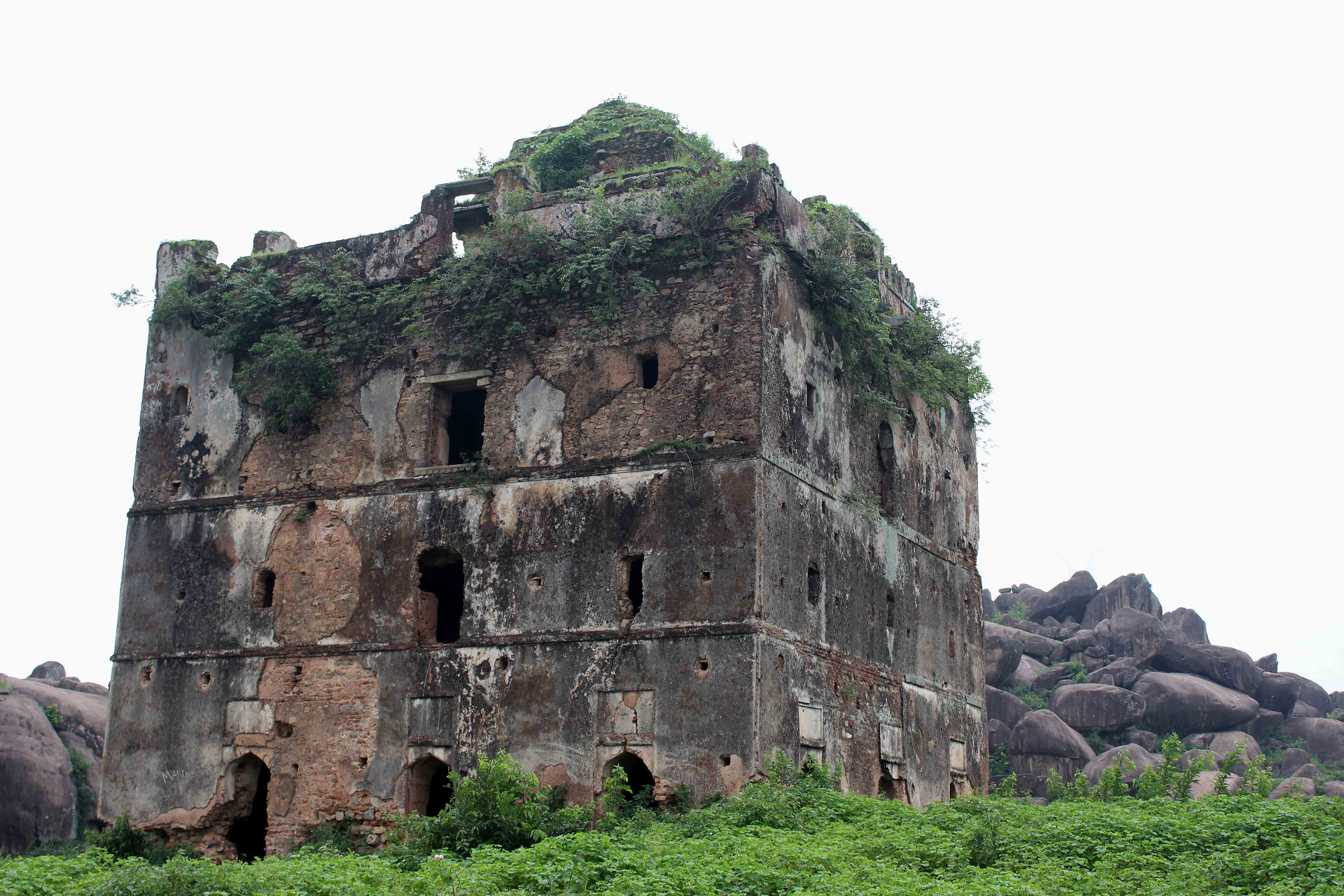
Navratangarh fort

He constructed the fort of Doisagarh, also known as Navratangarh, in Gumla around 1630.

== Death ==
He died in 1640 in Navratangarh. He succeeded by his brother Ram Shah.
