= Jagannath Temple, Ranchi =

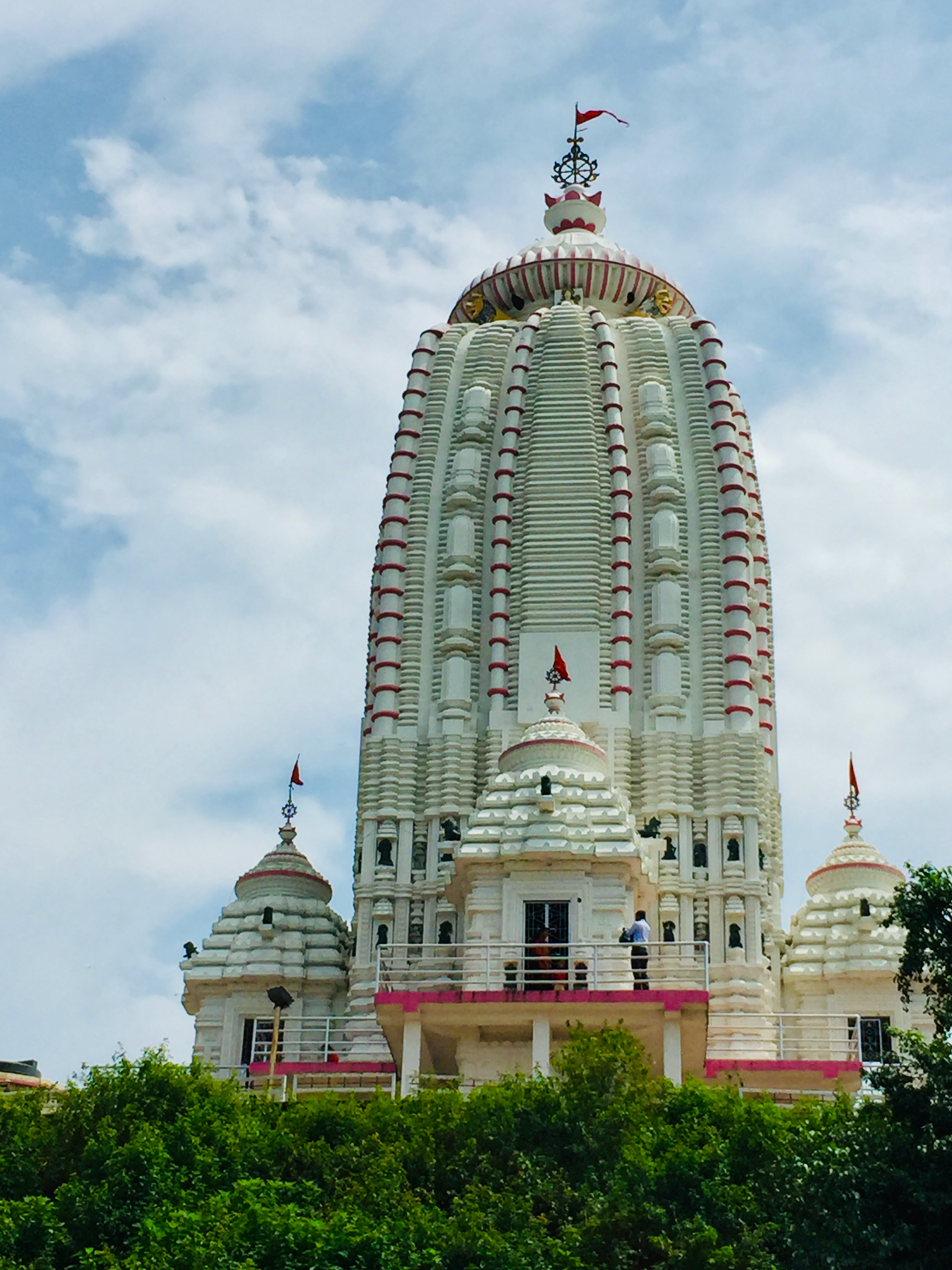
- Jagannath Temple, Ranchi

- Location in Jharkhand Jagannath Temple, Ranchi (India)

Religion
- Affiliation: Hinduism
- District: Ranchi
- Deity: Lord Jagannath
- Festival: Rath Yatra

Location
- Location: Ranchi
- State: Jharkhand
- Country: India
- Coordinates: 23°19′1″N 85°16′54″E

Architecture
- Creator: Ani Nath Shahdeo
- Completed: 1691

Jagannath Temple is a Hindu temple in Ranchi, Jharkhand, dedicated to the deity Jagannath. The original temple was built in 1691, and was rebuilt after collapsing in the 1990s.

The temple stands atop a hillock approximately 10 kilometres from the main town and is accessible by both a staircase and a motorable path. It is built in the Kalinga architectural style, resembling the Jagannath Temple of Puri, albeit on a smaller scale. Similar to the car festival in Puri, an Rath Yatra and annual fair is held at this temple in the month of Aashaadha, attracting thousands of tribal and non-tribal devotees from Ranchi and neighbouring areas.

== History ==
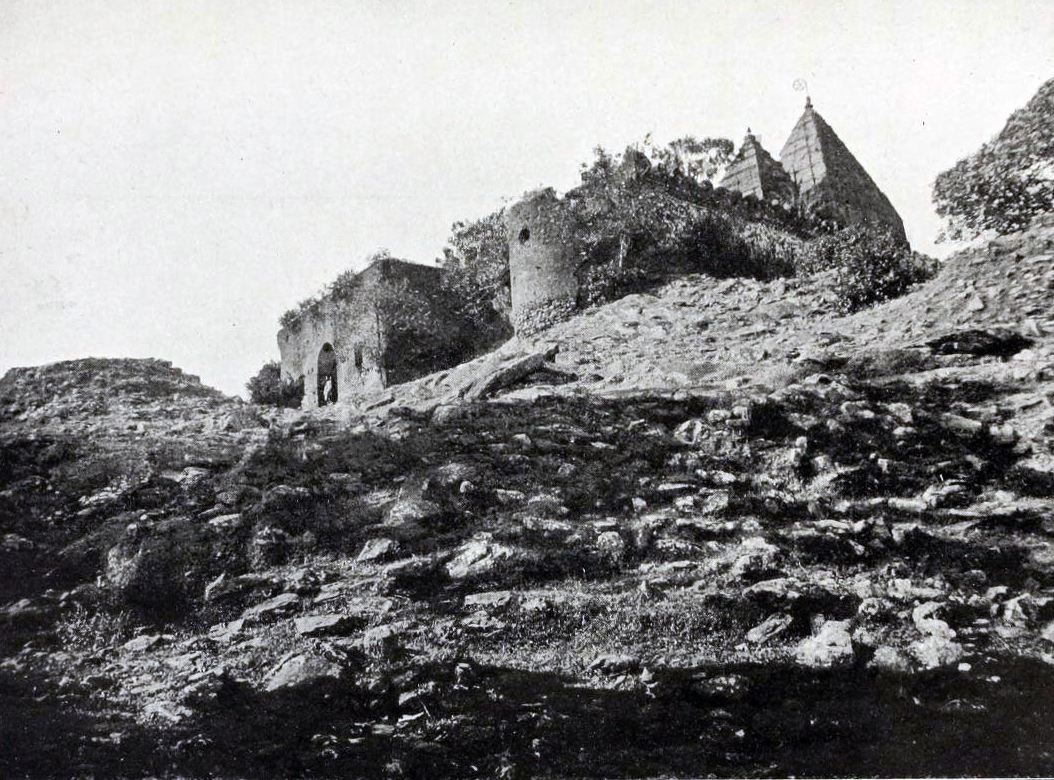
An early nineteenth century photograph of the Jagannath temple of Ranchi

The temple was built by king of Barkagarh Jagannathpur Thakur Ani Nath Shahdeo, and construction was completed on 25 December 1691.

The temple was desecrated and vandalized by the Mughal Emperor Aurangzeb in the year 1691.

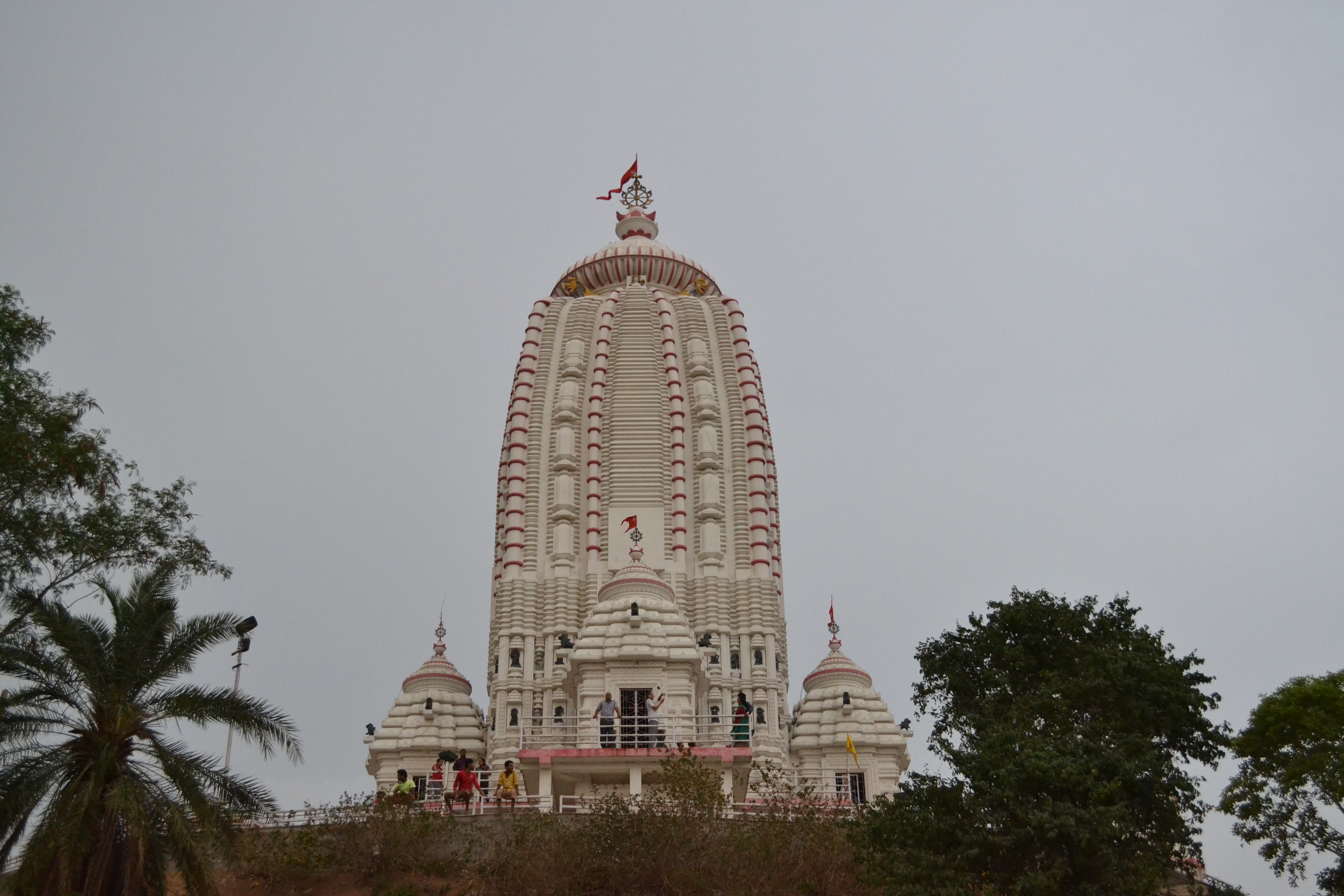
Reconstructed Jagannath Temple

The temple collapsed on 6 August 1990 and was reconstructed on 8 February 1992.

== See also ==
- List of Jagannath Temples outside Puri
