= Pithoria =

- Village
- Location in Jharkhand, India Pithoria (India)
- Coordinates: 23.5214°N 85.2915°E
- Country: India
- State: Jharkhand
- District: Ranchi

Government
  - Type: Federal democracy

Population (2011)
  - Total: 6,550

Languages (*For language details see Kanke block#Language and religion)
  - Official: Hindi, Urdu
- Time zone: UTC+5:30 (IST)
- PIN: 834006
- Telephone/ STD code: 0651
- Vehicle registration: JH 01
- Literacy: 78.62%
- Lok Sabha constituency: Ranchi
- Vidhan Sabha constituency: Kanke
- Website: ranchi.nic.in

Pithoria is a village in the Kanke CD block in the Ranchi Sadar subdivision of the Ranchi district in the Indian state of Jharkhand.

== History ==
According to legend, Phani Mukut Rai, the first Nagvanshi king established sun idol near Pithoria. In 2010, remains of Sun idol of sun temple have been discovered in Semair Bera and Rarha village about 11 km north of Pithoria which is dated to 12th century CE. Archeologist also discovered 16th century Idgah, 18th century Shiva temple, 19th century garrison. The garrison was built during Indian rebellion of 1857. According to literary source, Sher Shah Suri rested in idgarh before attacking Ghiyasuddin Mahmud Shah of Bengal. The garrison may have been constructed by king of Pithoria Jagatpal Singh in 1857.

== Geography ==
Cities, towns and locations in Ranchi district in South Chotanagpur Division
M: municipality, CT: census town, R: rural/ urban centre, N: neighbourhood, T: tourist centre, D: dam, H: historical/ religious centre
Owing to space constraints in the small map, the actual locations in a larger map may vary slightly

=== Location ===
Pithuriya is located at 23.5214°N 85.2915°E.

=== Area overview ===
The map alongside shows a part of the Ranchi plateau, most of it at an average elevation of 2,140 feet above sea level. Only a small part in the north-eastern part of the district is the lower Ranchi plateau, spread over Silli, Rahe, Sonahatu and Tamar CD blocks, at an elevation of 500 to 1,000 feet above sea level. There is a 16 km long ridge south-west of Ranchi. There are isolated hills in the central plateau. The principal river of the district, the Subarnarekha, originates near Ratu, flows in an easterly direction and descends from the plateau, with a drop of about 300 feet at Hundru Falls. Subarnarekha and other important rivers are marked on the map. The forested area is shaded in the map. A major part of the North Karanpura Area and some fringe areas of the Piparwar Area of the Central Coalfields Limited, both located in the North Karanpura Coalfield, are in Ranchi district. There has been extensive industrial activity in Ranchi district, since independence. Ranchi district is the first in the state in terms of population. 8.83% of the total population of the state lives in this district - 56.9% is rural population and 43.1% is urban population.

Note: The map alongside presents some of the notable locations in the district. All places marked in the map are linked in the larger full screen map.

== Civic administration ==
=== Police station ===
Pithoria police station is at Pithoria.

== Demographics ==
According to the 2011 Census of India, Pithoria had a total population of 6,550, of which 3,413 (52%) were males and 3,137 (48%) were females. Population in the age range 0–6 years was 963. The total number of literate persons in Pithoria was 4,393 (78.62% of the population over 6 years).

== Transport ==
State Highway 2 (Ramgarh-Patratu-Ranchi Road), an important roadway in Ranchi district, passes through Pithuriya.

== Education ==
Government High School is a Hindi-medium coeducational institution established in 1946. It has facilities for teaching from class I to class X. The school has a playground, a library with 104 books, and has 4 computers for teaching and learning purposes.

Kisan High School is a Hindi-medium coeducational institution established in 1977. It has facilities for teaching in classes IX and X. The school has a playground, a library with 850 books, and has 2 computers for teaching and learning purposes.

Prem Manjari High School is a Hindi-medium coeducational institution established in 1994. It has facilities for teaching from class I to class X. The school has a playground, a library with 334 books, and has 5 computers for teaching and learning purposes.

Nischal Memorial High School is a Hindi-medium coeducational institution established in 2001. It has facilities for teaching from class I to class X. The school has a playground, a library with 100 books, and has 4 computers for teaching and learning purposes.

Shaheed Sheikh Bhikari College of Education at Sutiyambe, Pithuriya, was established in 2012. Affiliated with Ranchi University, it offers a degree course in education.
