= Palkot =

- Village
- Location in Jharkhand, India Palkot (India)
- Coordinates: 22.874624°N 84.645364°E
- Country: India
- State: Jharkhand
- District: Gumla

Government
  - Type: Federal democracy

Population (2011)
  - Total: 8,945

Languages *
  - Official: Hindi, Urdu
- Time zone: UTC+5:30 (IST)
- PIN: 835220
- Telephone/ STD code: 06536
- Vehicle registration: JH 07
- Literacy: 73.71%
- Lok Sabha constituency: Khunti
- Vidhan Sabha constituency: Simdega
- Website: gumla.nic.in

Palkot is a village in the Palkot CD block in the Basia subdivision of the Gumla district in the Indian state of Jharkhand.

== History ==
During 18th century, Nagvanshi king Yadunath Shah shifted his capital from Navratangarh to Palkot due to Mughal invasion. The fort and temples of Lalgarh built by Nagvanshi king during their reign. In 1870, Nagvanshi shifted their capital to Ratu. But one branch left in Palkot. Initially Nagvanshi were Shaivite, but the daughter of King of Rewa brought idol of Durga with her after marriage. Then worship of Durga started among Nagvanshis. Since then Durga Puja festival have been organised in Palkot.

== Geography ==
Cities, towns and locations in Gumla district in South Chotanagpur Division
M: municipality, CT: census town, R: rural/ urban centre, H: historical/ religious centre, T: tourist centre, B: Bauxite mining centre
Owing to space constraints in the small map, the actual locations in a larger map may vary slightly

=== Location ===
Palkot is located at 22.874624°N 84.645364°E

Palkot, at an altitude of around 2,000 feet (610 m) above mean sea level, forms the boundary "between the Ranchi peneplain surface and the rugged south-west of the Chota Nagpur Plateau. Geologically, it is an area of intrusive granite formations with abundance of granite exposed in the hills around the area." The Pahaad (Palkot hill) and other photogenic granite exposures have attracted world-wide attention.

=== Area overview ===
The map alongside presents a rugged area, consisting partly of flat-topped hills called pat and partly of an undulating plateau, in the south-western portion of Chota Nagpur Plateau. Three major rivers – the Sankh, South Koel and North Karo - along with their numerous tributaries, drain the area. The hilly area has large deposits of Bauxite. 93.7% of the population lives in rural areas.

Note: The map alongside presents some of the notable locations in the district. All places marked in the map are linked in the larger full screen map.

== Civic administration ==
There is a police station at Palkot.

The headquarters of Palkot block CD block are located at Palkot village.

== Demographics ==
According to the 2011 Census of India, Palkot had a total population of 8,945, of which 4,413 (49%) were males and 4,532 (51%) were females. Population in the age range 0–6 years was 1,296. The total number of literate persons in Palkot was 5,638 (73.71% of the population over 6 years).

(*For language details see Palkot block#Language and religion)

== Education ==
Pumpapur Inter College is a Hindi-medium coeducational institution established in 1999. It has facilities for teaching in classes XI and XII. It has a playground, a library with 3,000 books and has 3 computers for teaching and learning purposes.

Kandarp High School Palkot is a Hindi-medium coeducational institution established in 1950. It has facilities for teaching from class VIII to class XII. The school has a playground and a library with 206 books.

Project Girls High School Palkot is a Hindi-medium girls only institutionestablished in 1982. It has facilities for teaching from class VIII to class X. The school has a library with 405 books.

== Culture ==
Palkot has a 350-years old Sati-Math that commemorates the sati committed by the Maharani of Chotanagpur who immolated herself after her husband’s death.

Gobar Silli Hill, 25 km from Gumla and near Palkot, attracts tourists with its mysterious rocks. "The main attraction is the five huge rocks piled up upon each other in an awkward position". Added to it is a lot of mythology and local hear-say.
