= Ranchi district =

- District
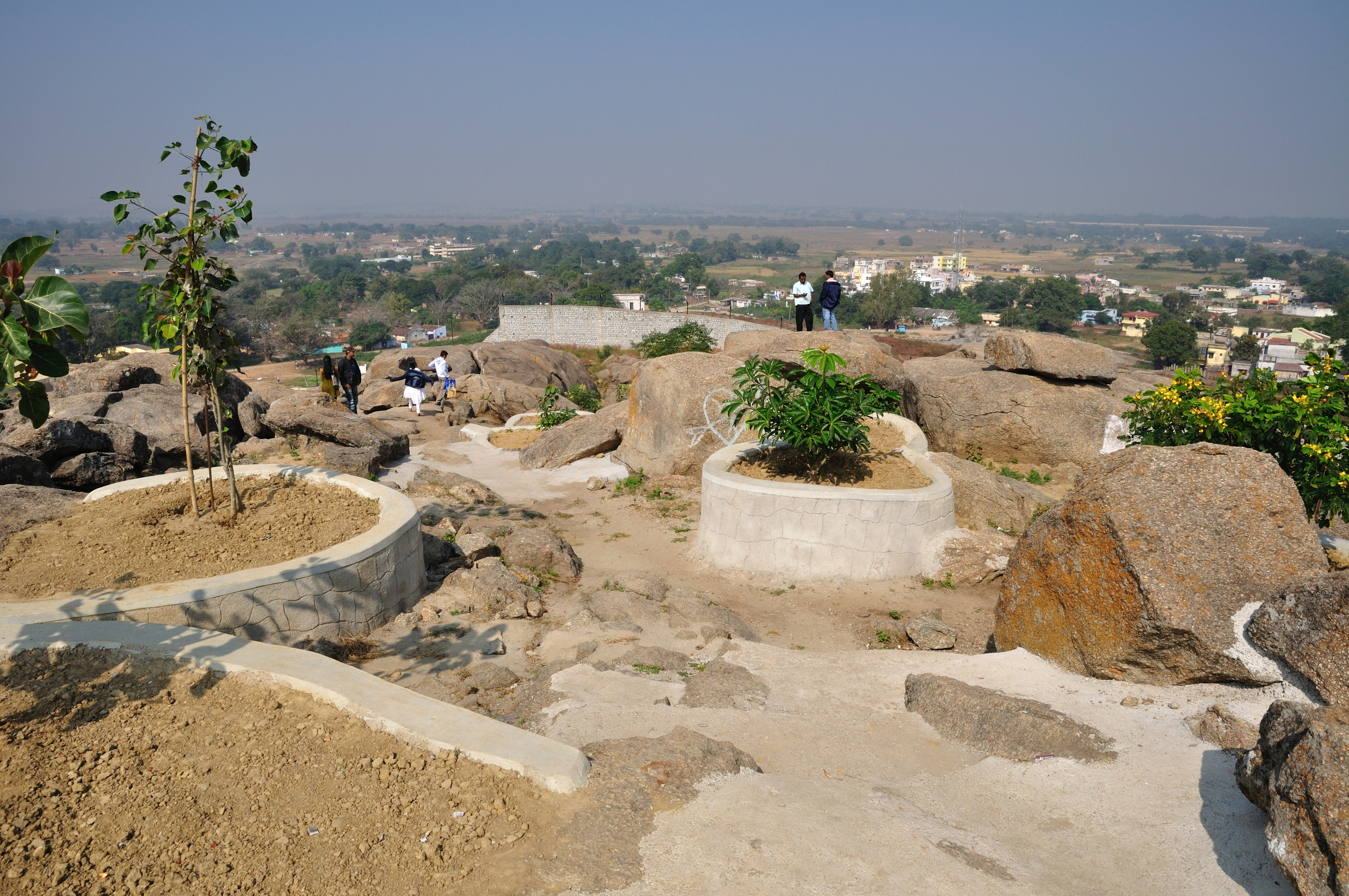
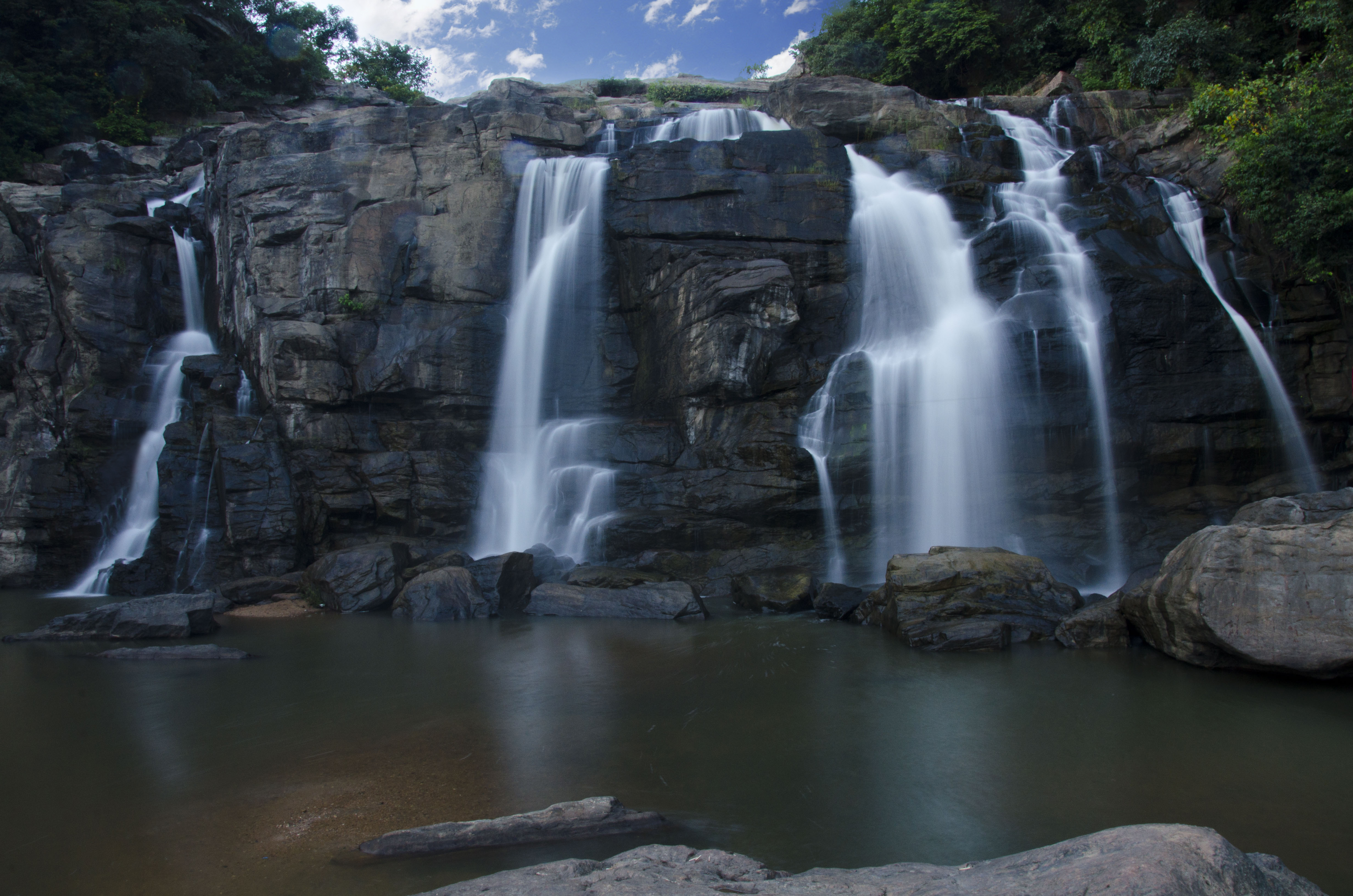
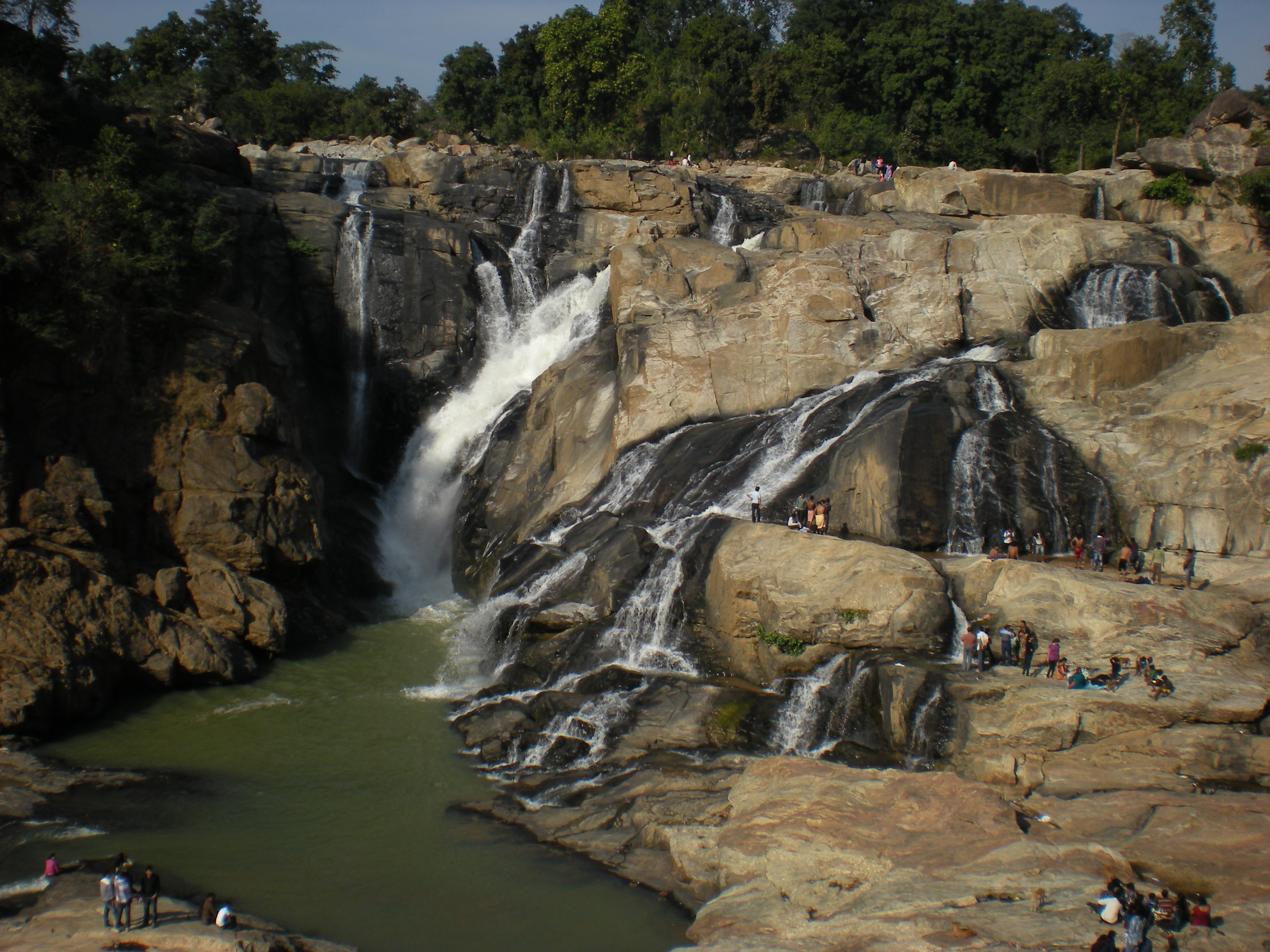
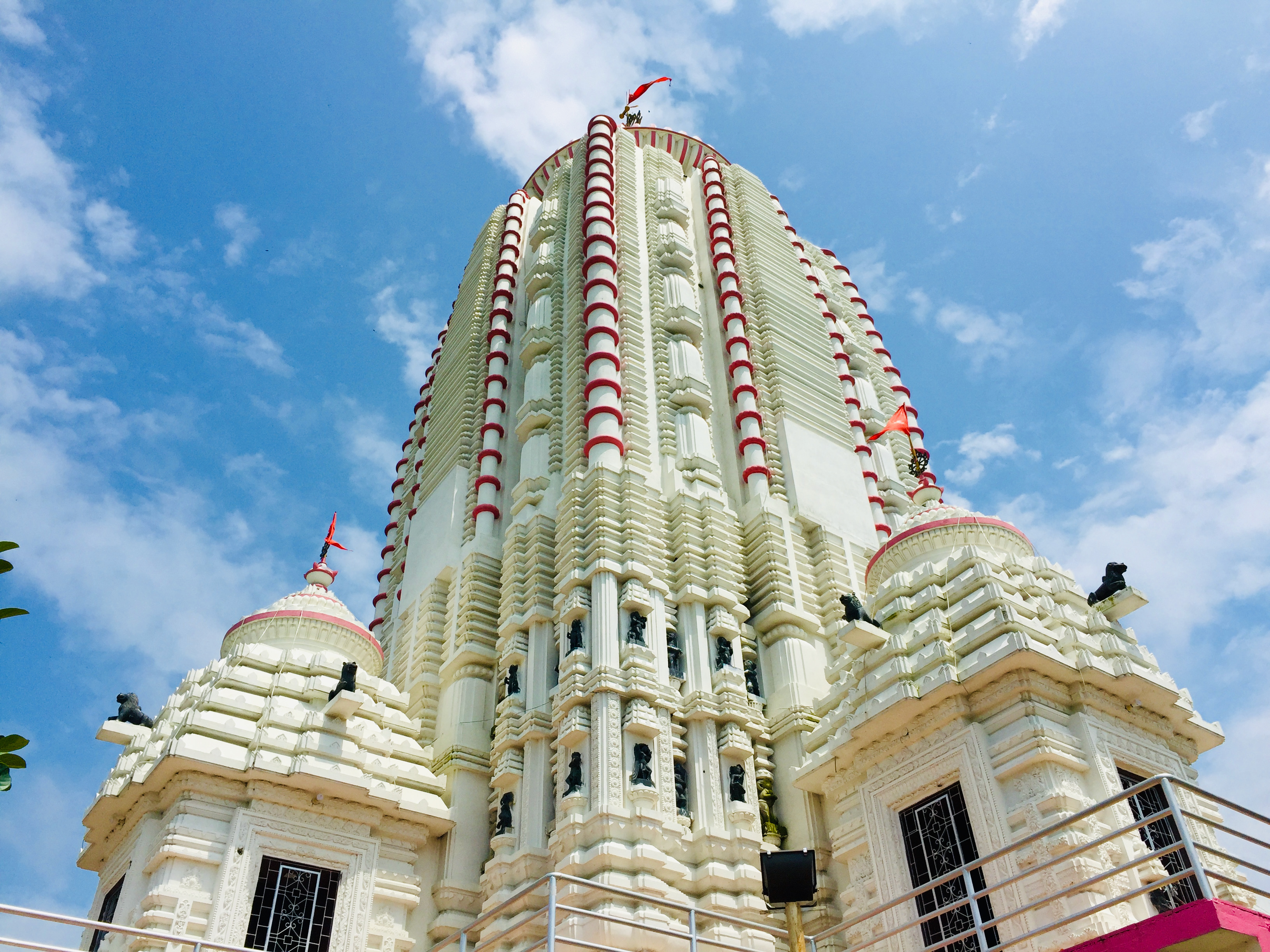
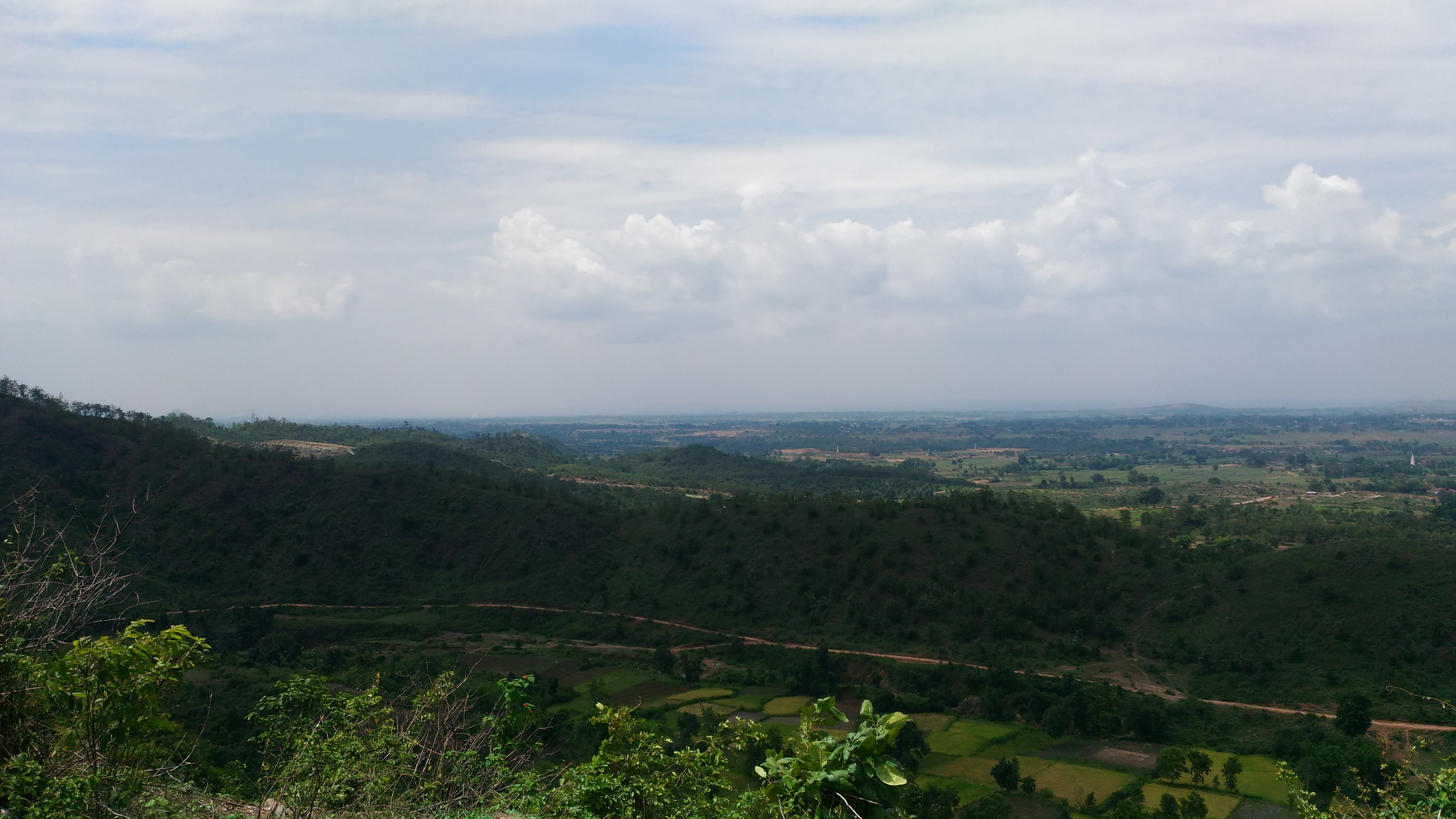
- Clockwise from top-left: Gonda Hill near Ranchi, Jonha Falls, Jagannath Temple at Ranchi, Sikidiri Valley, Dassam Falls
- Interactive map of Ranchi district
- Country: India
- State: Jharkhand
- Division: South Chotanagpur
- Established (as a district): 1899
- Headquarters: Ranchi
- District subdivisions: Ranchi Sadar; Bundu

Government
  - Member of Parliament: Sanjay Seth (BJP); Sukhdeo Bhagat (INC)
  - Deputy Commissioner: Shri Manjunath Bhajantri (IAS)
  - Senior Superintendent of police: Shri Rakesh Ranjan (IPS), SP
  - Vidhan Sabha constituencies: Tamar, Silli, Khijri, Ranchi, Hatia, Kanke, Mandar

Area
  - Total: 5,097 km^{2} (1,968 sq mi)

Population (2011)
  - Total: 2,914,253
  - Density: 572/km^{2} (1,480/sq mi)

Languages
  - Official: Hindi
  - Regional: Sadri, Kurmali, Kurukh, Mundari

Demographics
  - Literacy: 76.06%
  - Sex ratio: 949
- Time zone: UTC+5:30 (IST)
- ISO 3166 code: IN-JH
- LokSabha: Ranchi
- Major highways: NH 20, NH 43, NH 39, NH 320, NH 143AG
- Website: ranchi.nic.in

Ranchi district is the most populous district of Jharkhand state in eastern India. Ranchi, the capital of Jharkhand, is the district headquarters.

== History ==
Iron slag, potsherds and iron tools have been found in the Chota Nagpur plateau dated to 1400 BCE.

Magadha Empire exercised indirect control over the territory, which lasted until the reign of the Ashoka. Kalinga rulers are believed to have ravaged the region during their expeditions to Rajgir and Pataliputra. Armies of Samudra Gupta passed through the region on their expedition to Deccan. During medieval period, the Nagvanshi dynasty were ruling in the region. Khukhragarh was one of the capitals of Nagvanshi dynasty. With the expansion of the Mughal Empire, the Nagvanshis were forced to pay tribute, but they continued to rule and administer independently until the advent of the East India Company. Thakur Vishwanath Shahdeo, Pandey Ganpat Rai, Tikait Umrao Singh and Sheikh Bhikhari played pivotal role in Indian Rebellion of 1857. During the period of the British Raj, Adivasis and other locals of the Chotanagpur Plateau continued to oppose the subjugation by the British, and the region witnessed a number of uprisings and revolts.

== Geography ==
=== Climate ===
Ranchi

Climate chart (precipitation, max. and min. temperature)
J	F	M	A	M	J	J	A	S	O	N	D
23 23 4	30 26 13	27 31 17	32 36 22	55 37 24	199 34 24	346 29 23	329 29 22	282 29 22	89 28 19	8.7 26 14	6.1 23 4
- █ Average max. and min. temperatures in °C
- █ Precipitation totals in mm
- Source: IMD
Imperial conversion
J	F	M	A	M	J	J	A	S	O	N	D
0.9 73 39	1.2 78 55	1 88 63	1.2 96 71	2.1 99 74	7.8 92 75	14 84 73	13 83 72	11 84 71	3.5 83 66	0.3 78 57	0.2 73 39
- █ Average max. and min. temperatures in °F
- █ Precipitation totals in inches

Ranchi has a humid subtropical climate. However, due to its position and the forests around the city, it is known for its pleasant climate. Its climate is the primary reason why Ranchi was once the summer capital of the undivided State of Bihar. Ranchi used to be a preferable hill station in the past. Temperature ranges from maximum 42 to 20 °C during summer, and from 25 to 0 °C during winter. December and January are the coolest months with temperature getting to freezing point in some places of the city. The annual rainfall is about 1430 mm (56.34 inches). From June to September the rainfall is about 1,100 mm. Ranchi is located at 23°21′N 85°20′E.[5] The total area covered by the Ranchi municipal area is 175.12 square kilometres and the average elevation of the city is 651 m above sea level.

Ranchi is located on the southern part of the Chota Nagpur plateau which forms the eastern edge of the Deccan plateau. Ranchi is referred to as the "City of Waterfalls", due to the presence of numerous large and small falls of around the close vicinity of the city. The most popular ones are Dassam Falls, Hundru Falls, Jonha Falls, and Panchghagh Falls.

The Subarnarekha river and its tributaries constitute the local river system. Dams in Kanke, Rukka and Hatia have been built over these channels to cater to the water requirements of majority the population.

Ranchi has a hilly topography and its combination with dense tropical forests ensures that it enjoys a comparatively moderate climate compared to the rest of the state. Previously, it was accorded a 'hill station' status during the British rule. Rapid population growth and industrialization have caused considerable change in the weather pattern and rise in average temperatures. This has resulted in gradual loss of this "Hill Station" like status. It also has numerous dams constructed in different regions of the city inside and on the outskirts.

== Divisions ==
Presently, Ranchi district is divided into 2 sub-divisions and 14 administrative blocks. On 12 September 2007, Khunti district was created by carving Khunti subdivision and its 6 blocks out of Ranchi district. Ranchi sub-division is further divided into 11 blocks: Angara, Burmu, Bero, Chanho, Kanke, Lapung, Mandar, Namkum, Ormanjhi, Ratu and Silli. Bundu sub-division comprises 3 blocks: Bundu, Sonahatu, and Tamar, The district has 7 Assembly constituencies, namely, Tamar (ST), Silli, Khijri (ST), Ranchi, Hatia, Kanke (SC), and Mandar (ST). Silli, Khijri, Ranchi, Hatia and Kanke are part of Ranchi Lok Sabha constituency.

== Politics ==
District	No.	Constituency	Name	Party	Alliance	Remarks	Ranchi	58	Tamar	Vikash Kumar Munda
Ranchi	61	Silli	Amit Mahto							
Ranchi	62	Khijri	Rajesh Kachhap	INC						
Ranchi	63	Ranchi	C. P. Singh	BJP	NDA					
Ranchi	64	Hatia	Navin Jaiswal	BJP	NDA					
Ranchi	65	Kanke	Suresh Kumar Baitha	INC	MGB					
Ranchi	66	Mandar	Shilpi Neha Tirkey	INC	MGB	Cabinet minister				

== Education ==
Ranchi district boasts of many premier institutes in the field of higher education. This may be a reason that Ranchi has an average literacy rate of 77.13% (census 2011), higher than the national average of 74.04%: male literacy is 85.63%, and female literacy is 68.2%. Notable schools in Ranchi include Delhi Public School, Ranchi, Kairali School and St. Thomas School, Ranchi.

- Amity University, Jharkhand also known as Amity University, Ranchi, is a private university.
- Birsa Agricultural University at Ranchi was established in 1981.
- Birla Institute of Technology, Mesra (BIT, Mesra) at Mesra, Ranchi was established in 1955.
- Central Institute of Psychiatry (CIP Ranchi), offers higher level study in medical education. It is jointly administered by the Ministry of Health and Family Welfare and Directorate General of Health Services. It is also a psychiatry unit accepting patients from all over India and also Bhutan and Nepal. The British established this hospital in 1918 as the Ranchi European Lunatic Asylum.
- Central University of Jharkhand at Ranchi was established by an act of Indian Parliament (Act no. 25 of 2009) in 2009. Like other Central Universities of India it is a teaching and research university. The university is functional in its temporary 45-acre campus located at Brambe, Mandar.
- IIIT Ranchi or IIITR (Indian Institute of Information Technology, Ranchi) Established in 2016, it mainly offers undergraduate programmes for computer science and electronics.
- Indian Institute of Management Ranchi (IIM Ranchi), the eighth Indian Institute of Management was established at Ranchi in 2010. It currently offers a two-year PGDM as its flagship program and has launched PFPEX recently for research work.
- National Institute of Advanced Manufacturing Technology (NIAMT) formerly known as the National Institute of Foundry and Forge Technology (NIFFT) was set up in 1966 by the Government of India in collaboration with UNDP-UNESCO to provide quality engineers and well trained specialists for running Manufacturing, Metallurgical, Foundry and Forge industries.
- National University of Study and Research in Law, Ranchi was established by a legislative act of the Government of Jharkhand as the fourteenth national law university of India. It offers graduate and post-graduate courses in law.
- Rajendra Institute of Medical Sciences a medical institute of Ranchi University in Ranchi, was established in 2002 by upgrading the then Rajendra Medical College Hospital (RMCH) which was established in 1960. The courses offered are MBBS, M.D., Mch Neurosurgery, BDS, BSc Nursing, BSc(Post Basic) Nursing, GNM, Paramedical and Physiotherapy.
- Ranchi University, presently comprising 35 constituent colleges and 29 affiliated colleges, was established in 1960. One of its constituent college, St. Xavier's College at Ranchi was established in 1944.
- Xavier Institute of Social Service(XISS), Ranchi started in 1955 to educate young graduates in social work and management programs as an extension of St Xavier's college Ranchi. In 1975, the department registered itself as a separate institute and established their new campus in Purulia Road, Ranchi. The institute offers graduate and post-graduate course in management studies.

== Demographics ==
Historical population

Year	Pop.	±%
1901	477,249	—
1911	557,488	+16.8%
1921	536,346	−3.8%
1931	629,863	+17.4%
1941	673,376	+6.9%
1951	748,050	+11.1%

Year	Pop.	±%
1961	894,921	+19.6%
1971	1,164,661	+30.1%
1981	1,489,303	+27.9%
1991	1,827,718	+22.7%
2001	2,350,245	+28.6%
2011	2,914,253	+24.0%

Source: Census of India

Religion in Ranchi district (2011)
Religion	Percent
Hinduism	55.32%
ORP	23.25%
Islam	14.09%
Christianity	6.66%
Not stated	0.68%
*ORP mostly adherents of Sarnaism

According to the 2011 census Ranchi district has a population of 2,914,253, roughly equal to the nation of Jamaica or the US state of Arkansas. This gives it a ranking of 130th in India (out of a total of 640). The district has a population density of 572 inhabitants per square kilometre (1,480/sq mi). Its population growth rate over the decade 2001-2011 was 23.9%. Ranchi has a sex ratio of 950 females for every 1000 males, and a literacy rate of 76.06%. 43.14% of the population lives in urban areas. Scheduled Castes and Scheduled Tribes collectively account for 41.01% (SC 5.25% and ST 35.76%) of the district's total population. The prominent scheduled communities are Oraon (18.2%), Munda (10.3%), Lohra (2.46%), Bedia (1.32%), Ghasi (1.21%), Mahli (1.09%), Dhobi (0.73%), Bhogta (0.7%), Chamar/Mochi (0.63%), Dusadh (0.36%), Pan (0.33%), Karmali (0.32%), Chik Baraik (0.32%), Dom (0.29%), Kharia (0.27%), Bhuiya (0.2%), Santal (0.19%), Turi (0.12%), Rajwar (0.11%), Gorait (0.1%), Hari/Mehtar/Bhangi (0.08%), Ho (0.07%), Binjhia (0.07%), Pasi (0.07%), and Kharwar (0.05%). Other communities such as Gond, Birhor, Bauri, Kol, Kora, Chero, Bhumij, Kisan, Nat, Mal Paharia, Musahar, Banjara, and Asur/Agaria also have populations ranging between one thousand to a hundred.

=== Languages ===
Languages of Ranchi district (2011)
1. Sadri (30.2%)
2. Hindi (28.1%)
3. Panchpargania (11.9%)
4. Urdu (8.55%)
5. Kurukh (7.52%)
6. Mundari (4.70%)
7. Bengali (2.51%)
8. Bhojpuri (2.17%)
9. Magahi (1.17%)
10. Others (3.04%)

At the time of the 2011 Census of India, 30.23% of the population in the district spoke Sadri, 28.08% Hindi, 8.55% Urdu, 7.52% Kurukh, 11.88% Panchpargania, 4.70% Mundari, 2.51% Bengali, 2.17% Bhojpuri and 1.17% Magahi as their first language.

== Administration ==
Ranchi district is headed by an IAS officer of the rank of Deputy Commissioner (DC). Ranchi district consists of 2 Sub-divisions and 18 Blocks. The following are the list of the Blocks in Ranchi district:

No.	Ranchi subdivision	Bundu subdivision
1	Burmu	Rahe
2	Khelari	Bundu
3	Kanke	Sonahatu
4	Ormanjhi	Tamar
5	Silli	
6	Angara	
7	Namkum	
8	Ratu	
9	Nagri	
10	Mandar	
11	Chanho	
12	Bero	
13	Itki	
14	Lapung	

== Notable people ==
=== Central Minister ===
- Subodh Kant Sahay, Former Minister Government of India

=== MP of Ranchi ===
- Prashant Kumar Ghosh, Former MP Ranchi
- Ravindra Varma, Former MP Ranchi
- Subodh Kant Sahay, Former Minister Government of India
- C.P. Singh (Indian politician).

=== Other ===
- Rajesh Chauhan, former Indian cricketer, born in Ranchi
- Deeba, Pakistani actress
- MS Dhoni, former captain of Indian Cricket Team
- Carl Haeberlin, German physician, born in Ranchi
- Madhu Mansuri Hasmukh, folk singer
- Rajesh Jais, actor
- Komal Jha, actress
- Anjana Om Kashyap, Indian journalist and news presenter
- Neelu Kohli, actress
- Deepika Kumari, Indian professional archer
- Supriya Kumari, actress
- Peter Mansfield, British journalist and historian, was born in Ranchi
- Pat Reid MBE MC, escapee from Colditz Castle, born in Ranchi
- Anushka Sen, actress
- Gopal Sharan Nath Shahdeo, Nagvanshi prince and MLA
- Lal Chintamani Sharan Nath Shahdeo, last Nagvanshi king
- Vishwanath Shahdeo, freedom fighter, born in Barkagarh, Ranchi
- Alisha Singh, dancer and choreographer

== Transport ==
=== Roadways ===
- NH 20 ( Patna - Ranchi - Odisha )
- NH 43 ( MP - Chhattisgarh - Ranchi )
- NH 39 ( UP - MP - Ranchi )
- NH 320 ( Ramgarh - Ranchi - Bokaro )
- NH 143AG ( Lohardaga - Ranchi - Khunti - Tamar )
- SH 1 (JH) ( Ranchi - Muri )
- SH 2 (JH) ( Ranchi - Ramgarh )
- SH 7 (JH) ( Ranchi - Chatra - Hazaribagh )
- Ranchi Ring Road

=== Railways ===
- Ranchi Junction railway station
- Hatia railway station
- Muri Junction railway station
- Tatisilwai railway station
- Namkon railway station
- Mesra railway station
- Piska railway station
- Argora railway station

=== Airways ===
- Birsa Munda Airport, Ranchi

== Economy ==
In 2006 the Indian government named Ranchi one of the country's 250 most backward districts (out of a total of 640). It is one of the 23 districts in Jharkhand currently receiving funds from the Backward Regions Grant Fund Programme (BRGF). In the aspirational districts, Ranchi have improved.
