= Dassam Falls =

Waterfalls in Ranchi, Jharkhand

- दशम जलप्रपात
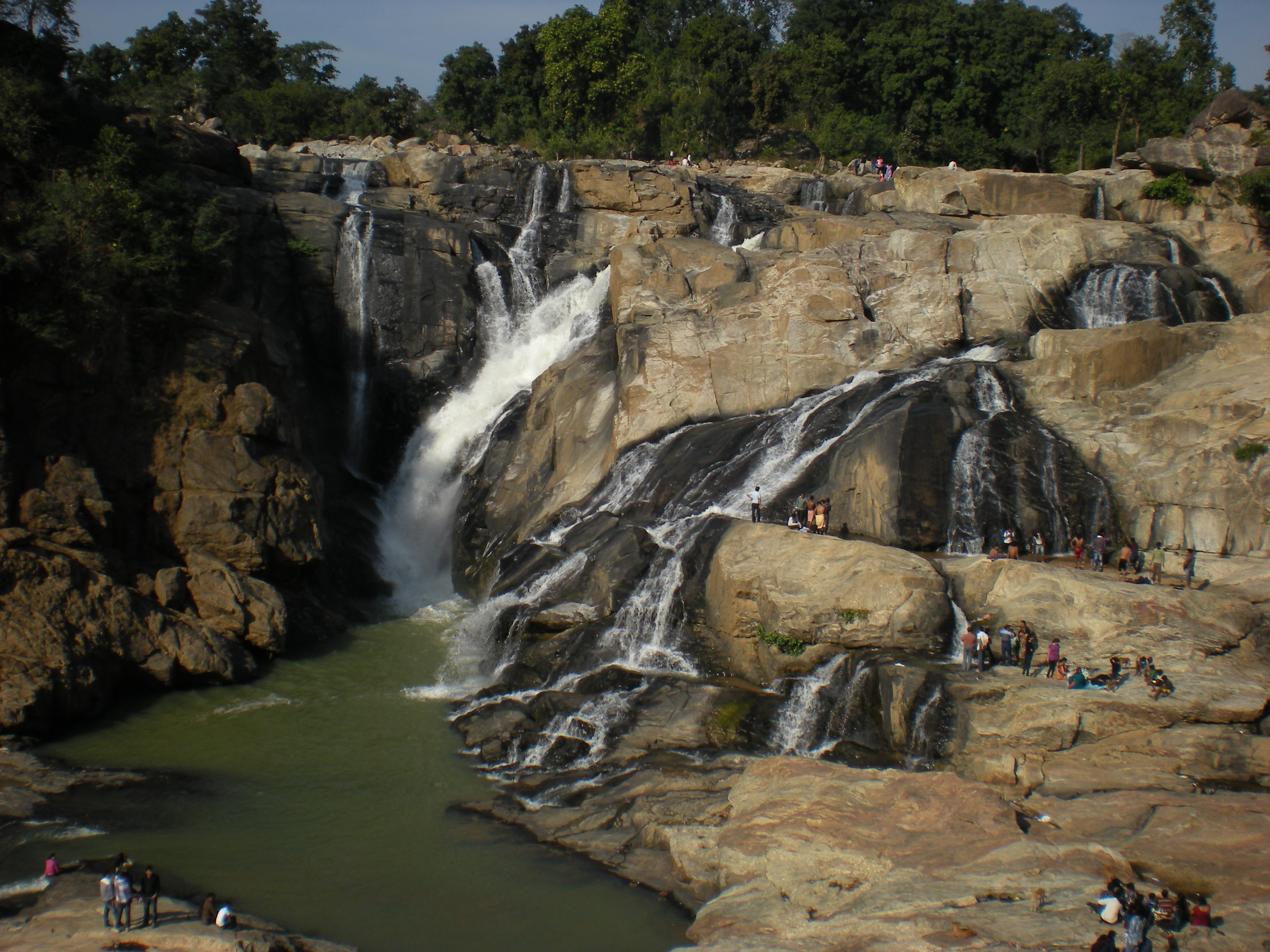
- Dassam Water Falls
- Interactive map of Dassam Falls
- Location: Ranchi district, Jharkhand, India
- Coordinates: 23.143358°N 85.466441°E
- Elevation: 336 metres (1,102 ft)
- Total height: 44 metres (144 ft)
- Number of drops: 2
- Average width: d
- Watercourse: Kanchi River

The Dassam Falls (also known as Dassam Ghagh) is a waterfall located near Taimara village in the Bundu subdivision of Ranchi district in the Indian state of Jharkhand. The Falls are 144 feet in height, formed by the waterflow of the Kanchi River.

== Etymology ==
Dassam is a changed form of word Da:song which means in mundari language the act of pouring water. Da: means water and song means pouring or measuring. The water fall resembles like somebody is pouring water so the name was Da:song earlier but afterwards the name was changed to Dassam.

The place is also known as Dassam Garh.

== Geography ==
Cities, towns and locations in Ranchi district in South Chotanagpur Division
M: municipality, CT: census town, R: rural/ urban centre, N: neighbourhood, T: tourist centre, D: dam, H: historical/ religious centre
Owing to space constraints in the small map, the actual locations in a larger map may vary slightly

=== Location ===
Dassam Falls is located at 23.143358°N 85.466441°E.

Note: The map alongside presents some of the notable locations in the district. All places marked in the map are linked in the larger full screen map.

== The falls ==
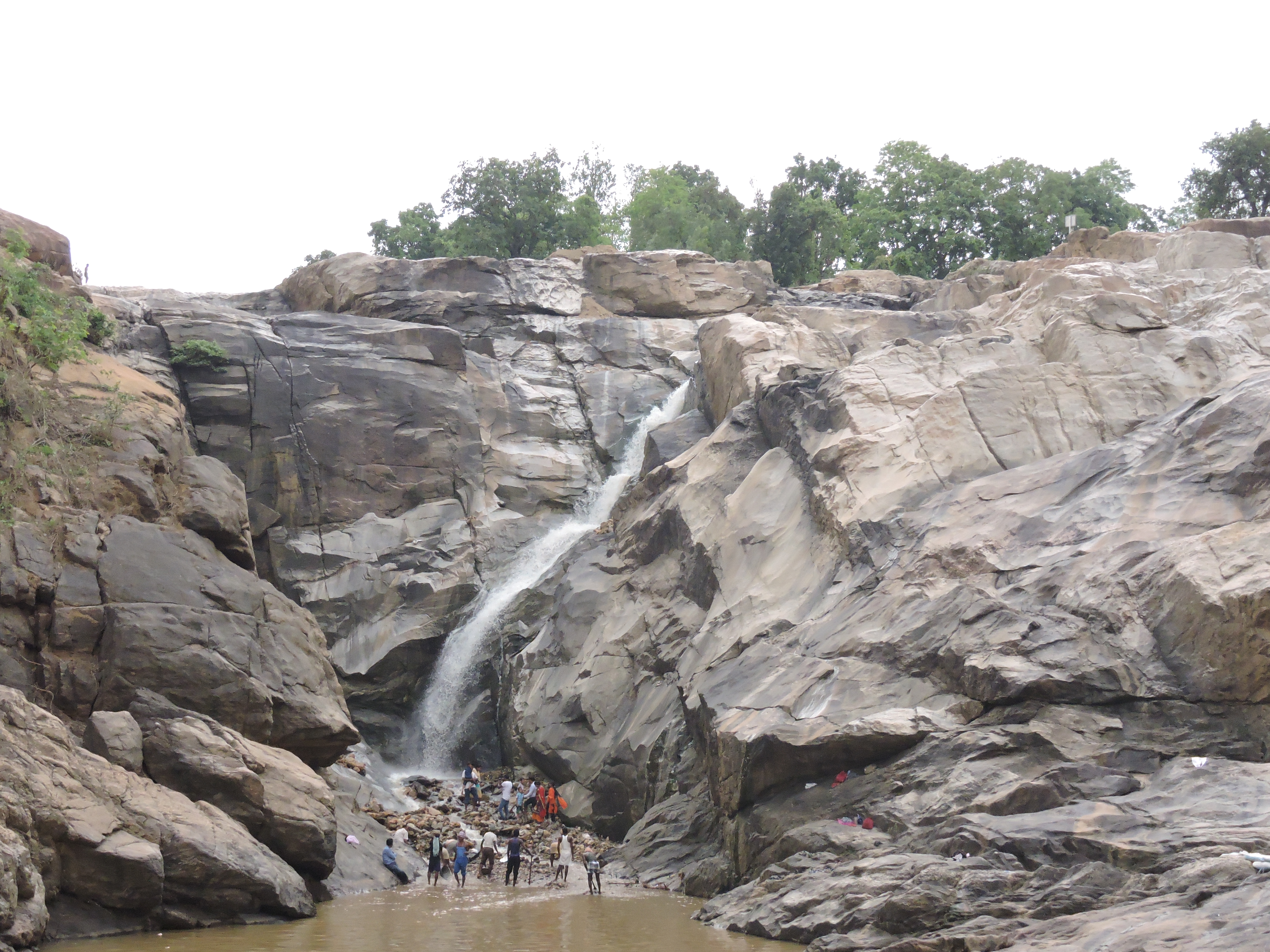
Dasam Falls

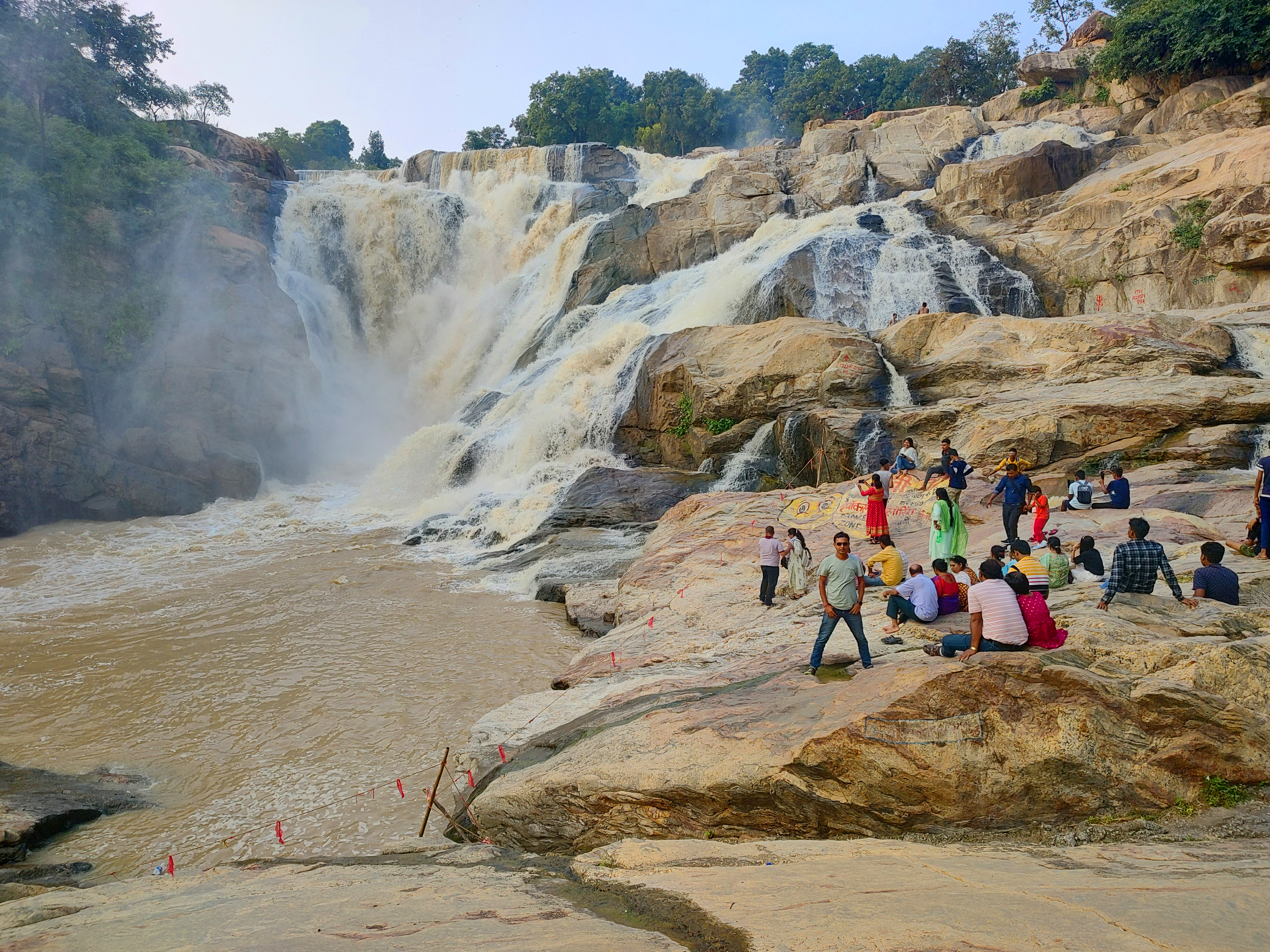
Tourists at Dassam Falls

The Dassam Falls is a natural cascade across the Kanchi River, a tributary of the Subarnarekha River. The water falls from a height of 44 metres (144 ft). The sound of water echoes all around the place. Dassam Falls at one of the edges of the Ranchi plateau is one of the many scarp falls in the region.

The Dassam Falls is an example of a nick point caused by rejuvenation. Knick point, also called a nick point or simply nick, represents breaks in slopes in the longitudinal profile of a river caused by rejuvenation. The break in channel gradient allows water to fall vertically giving rise to a waterfall.

The water of the Dassam Falls is very clean and clear. It is natural for a tourist to be enticed to enter the water for a bath or swim but tourists are warned not to do so because of the current that is generated. There have been many cases of drowning in Dassam Falls. Nine people died of drowning between 2001 and 2006.

== Transport ==
The Dassam Falls is 40 kilometres (25 mi) from Ranchi on NH 33 (now NH-18) or Ranchi-Jamshedpur highway.

== See also ==
- List of waterfalls
- List of waterfalls in India
- List of waterfalls in India by height
