= Piska railway station =

Railway station in Jharkhand

Piska
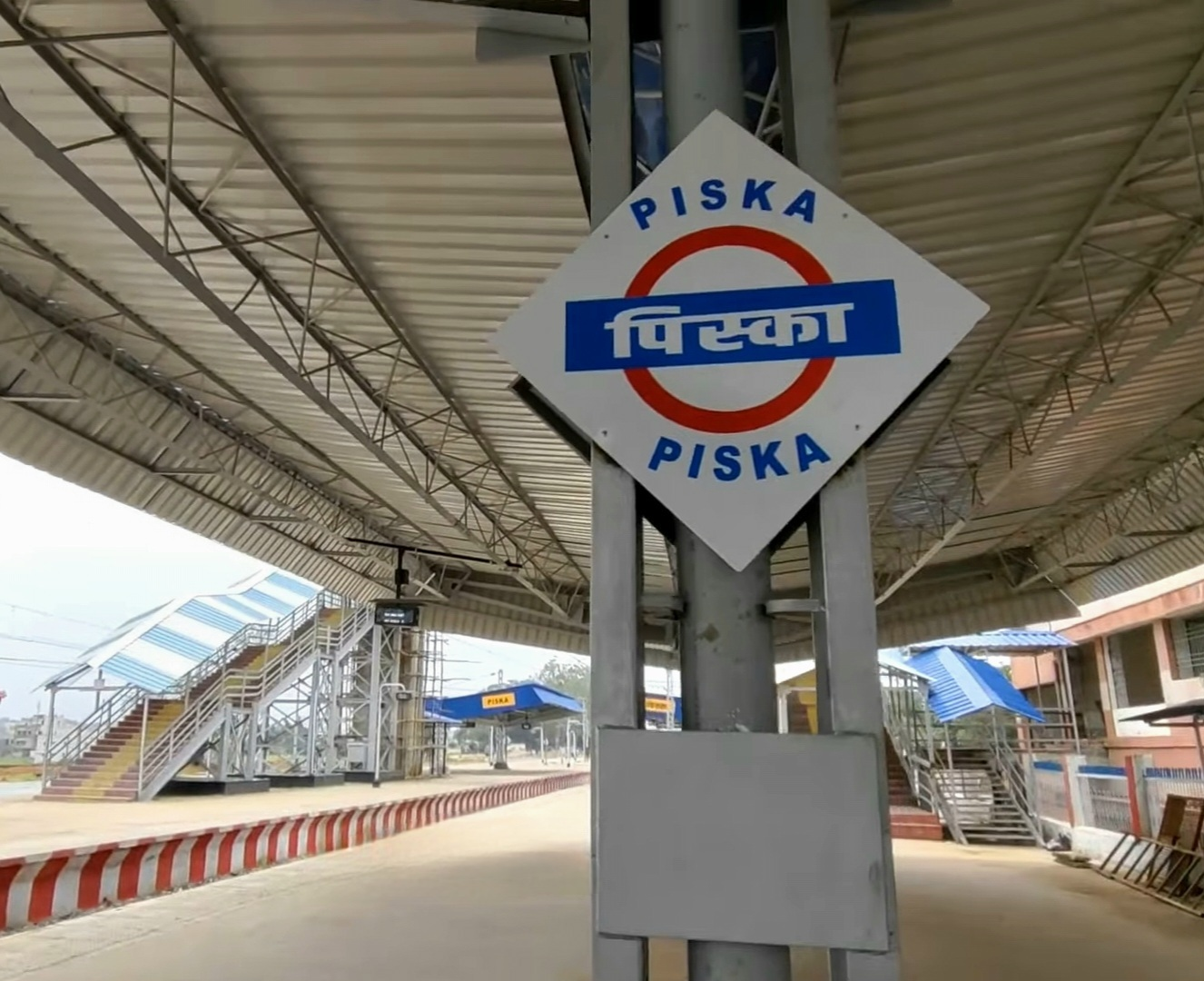

General information
- Location: Piska, Ranchi district, Jharkhand; India
- Coordinates: 23°19′47″N 85°12′23″E
- Elevation: 707 metres (2,320 ft)
- System: Indian Railways station
- Owner: South Eastern Railway
- Operator: Indian Railways
- Line: Barkakana-Son Nagar line
- Platforms: 3
- Tracks: Broad gauge

Construction
- Structure type: At grade
- Parking: Available

Other information
- Status: Active
- Station code: PIS
- Zone(s): South Eastern Railway
- Division(s): Ranchi
Route map
Location

Piska railway station (station code: PIS) is a railway station on the Barkakana–Son Nagar line in Ranchi district, Jharkhand. It comes under the Ranchi railway division of the South Eastern Railway zone. The station serves Piska and its surrounding nearby villages. Only passenger and MEMU trains have scheduled halts here.

== Facilities ==
The station has three platforms, which are linked by a foot overbridge. Basic passenger facilities include a ticket counter, platform sheds and a drinking water supply.

However the station is being redeveloped under the Amrit Bharat Station Scheme to provide modern and passenger friendly amenities. Upon completion, the station will feature a new station building, upgraded platforms with shelters and a 12-metre wide foot overbridge connecting the platforms. Additional improvements include lifts, an improved approach road, a new circulating area and parking facilities for vehicles.

Passenger conveniences will be enhanced with a new booking counter, waiting rooms, water booths, and seating arrangements. Facilities for disabled passengers include ramps, tactile tiles, accessible toilets and designated parking. The station will also be decorated in the theme of local art and culture to reflect the region’s heritage.

== Trains ==
Both EMU & Passenger express trains have scheduled halts here, however superfast and mail express trains don't operate from this station as of yet.
