= Topchanchi Wildlife Sanctuary =

Protected area in Jharkhand, India

- IUCN category IV (habitat/species management area)
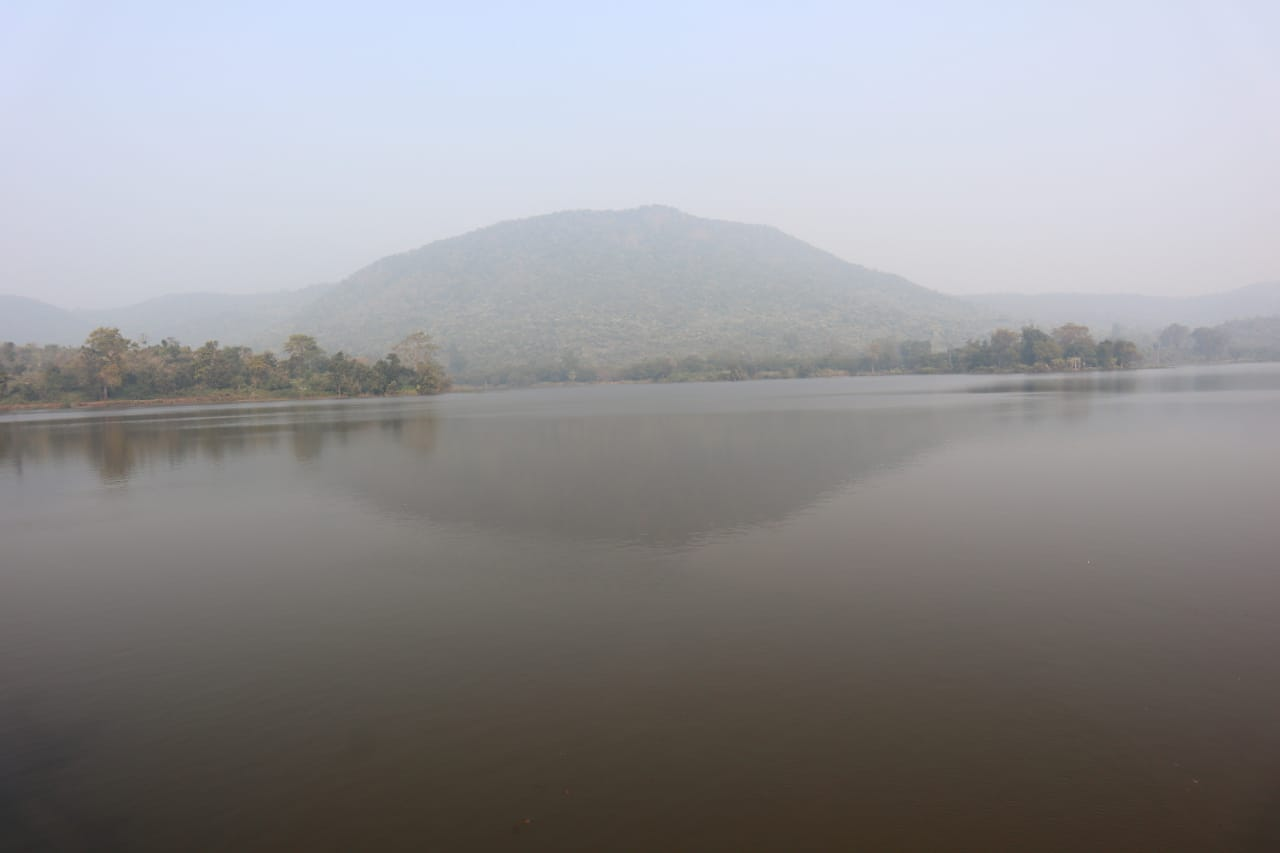

- Location within Jharkhand Location within India
- Interactive map of Topchanchi Wildlife Sanctuary
- Location: Topchanchi, Jharkhand, India
- Nearest city: Dhanbad, India
- Coordinates: 23°56′10″N 86°11′32″E
- Area: 2,162 acres (8.75 km^{2})

Topchanchi Wildlife Sanctuary is an 8.75 km^{2} (3.38 sq mi) protected area located near the town of Topchanchi, Jharkhand. The sanctuary is situated alongside National Highway 2. Land in the sanctuary mainly consists of dry mixed deciduous forests with dry peninsular sal forests.

== Flora and fauna ==
The dry peninsular sal forests are mainly made up of sal trees, although other flora such as bamboo and grass in unforested plains. Mammals that are found in the sanctuary include leopards, jungle cats, cheetal, barking deer, and wild boar.

The Topchanchi Lake adds to the diversity of the area, and migratory birds stop by during the winter.

== Gallery ==
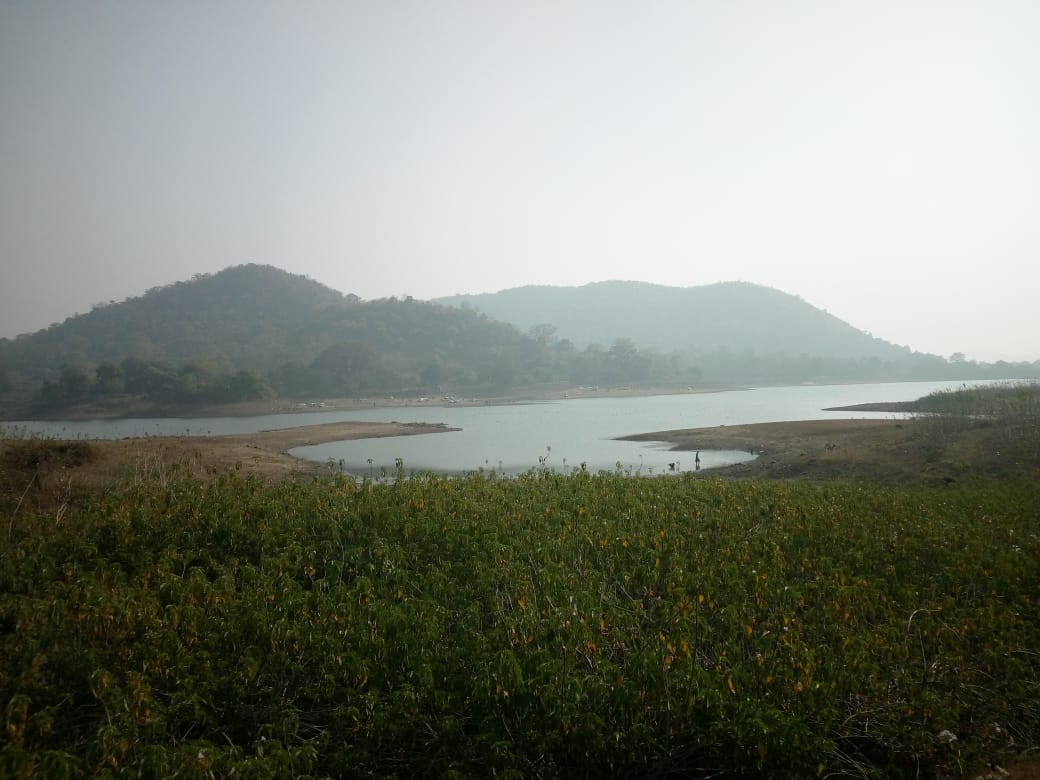
Hill

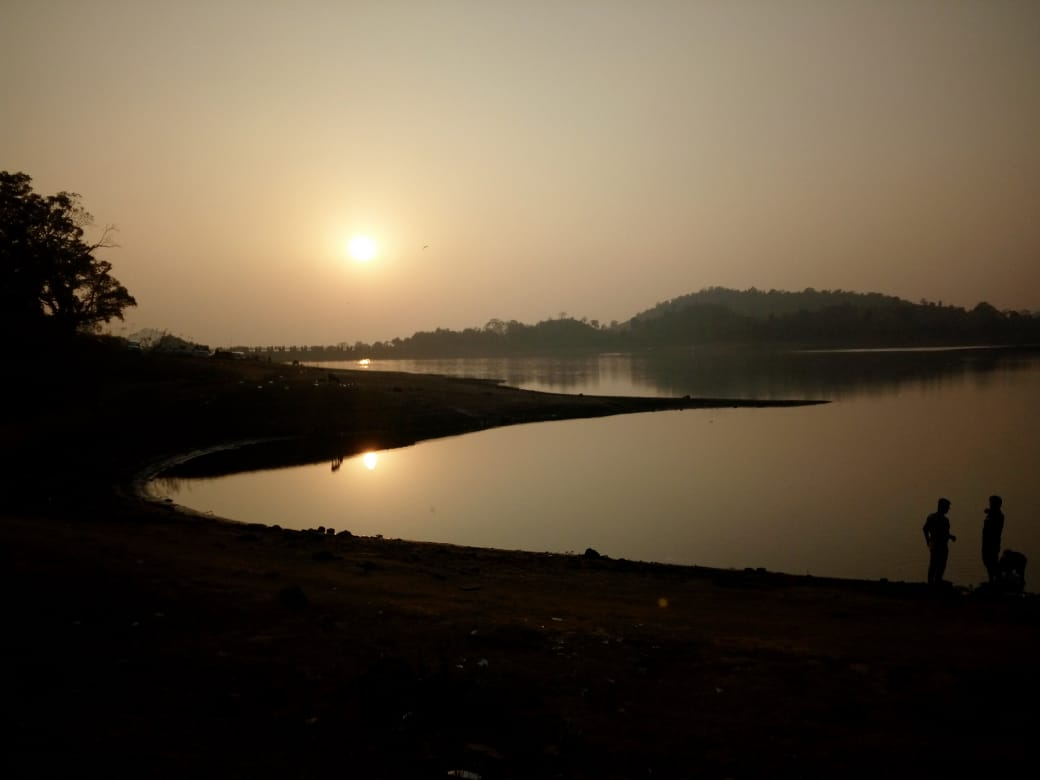
Sunset

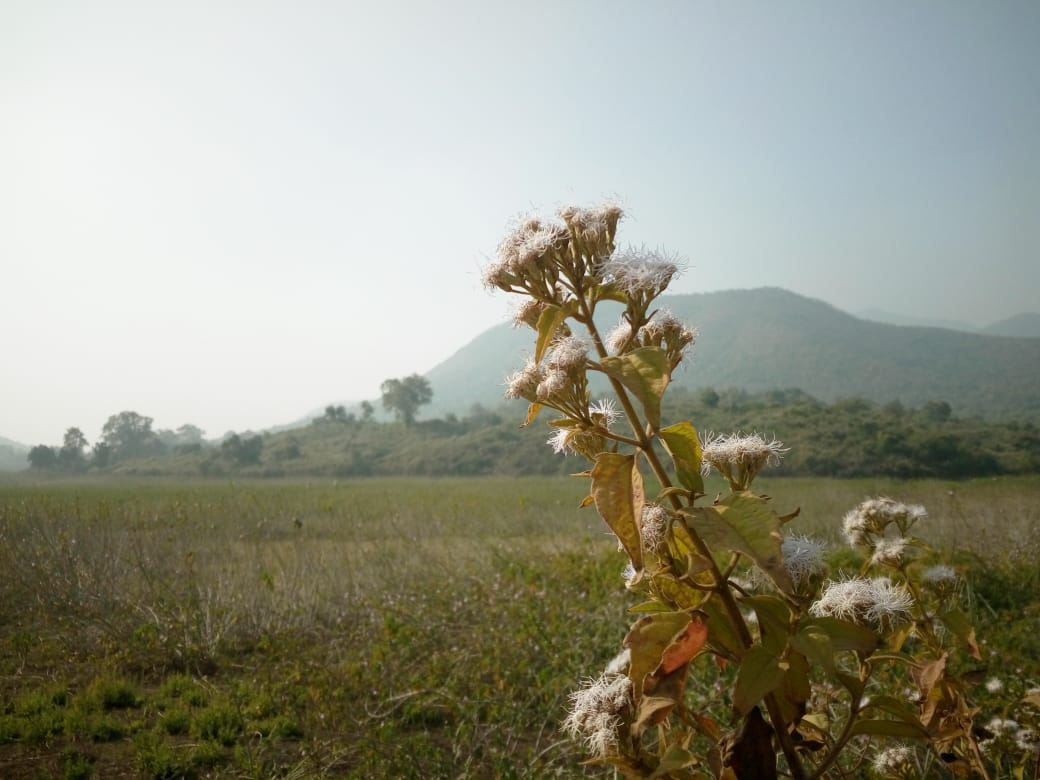
Flower

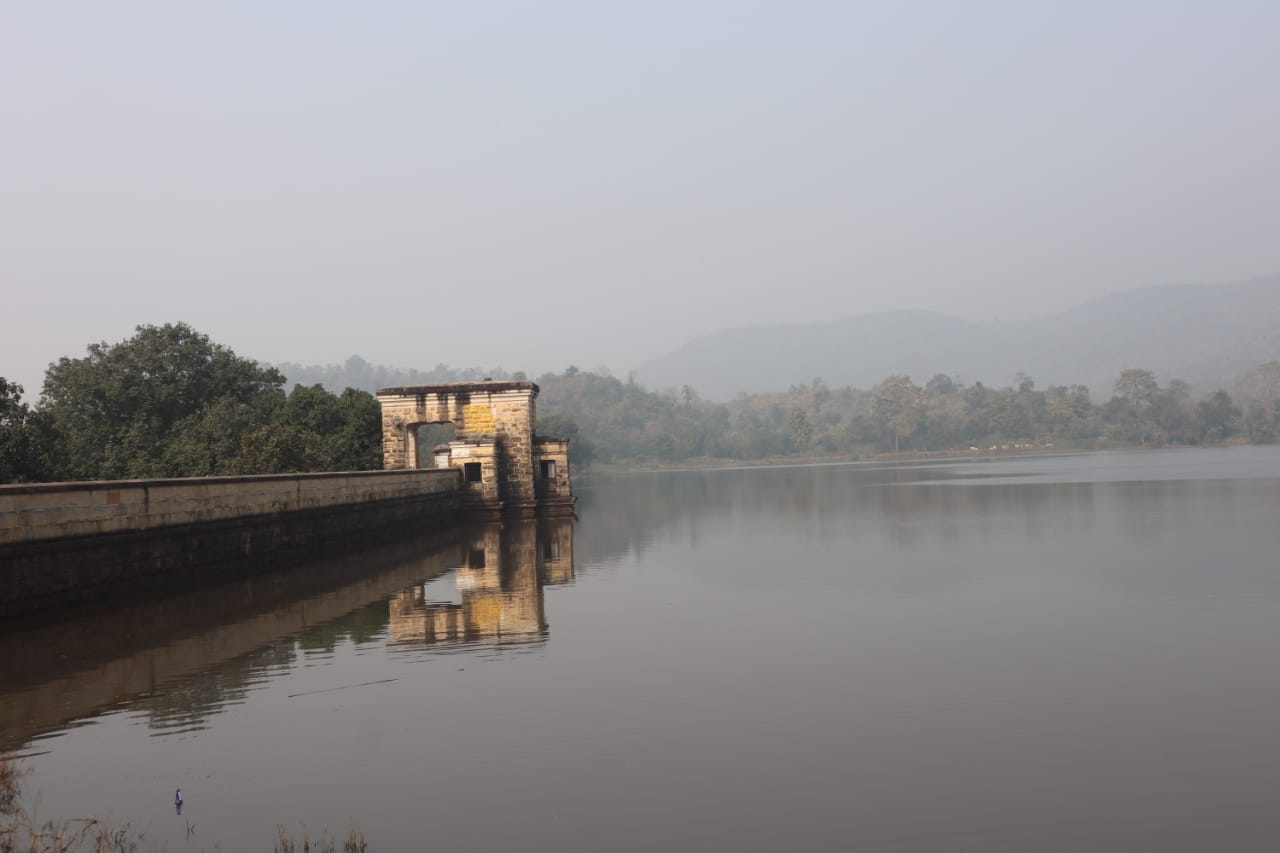
Bridge
