= Panchghagh Falls =

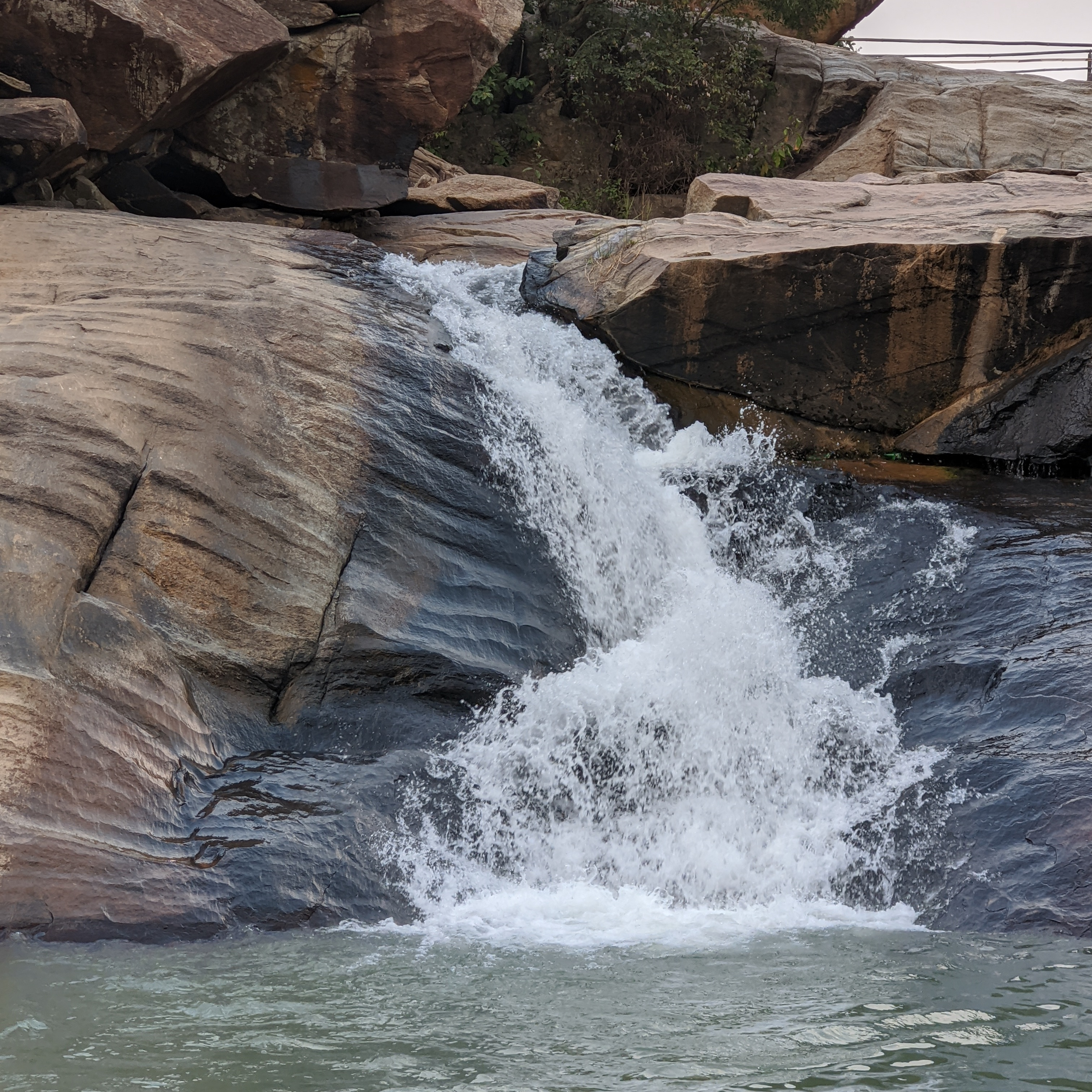

- Location within Jharkhand Location within India
- Location: Khunti district, Jharkhand, India
- Coordinates: 22°56′41″N 85°15′17″E
- Number of drops: 5
- Watercourse: Banai River

Panchghagh Falls is a waterfall located in Khunti district in the Indian state of Jharkhand.

== Geography ==
Cities, towns and locations in Khunti district in South Chotanagpur Division
M: municipality, CT: census town, R: rural/ urban centre, T: tourist centre
Owing to space constraints in the small map, the actual locations in a larger map may vary slightly

=== Location ===
Panchghagh Falls is located at 22°56′41″N 85°15′17″E.

=== Area overview ===
In the adjacent map the area shown is “undulating and covered with hills, hillocks and jungles (jungles/ forests are shown as shaded area in the map). The soil of the area is rocky, sandy and red loam upland. There are paddy fields only in the depressions. It has a gentle slope adjacent to the streams.” A major part of the district is in the 500–700 metres (1,600–2,300 ft) elevation range, with up to ± 200 m for some parts. In 2011, it had a density of population of 210 persons per sq km. Khunti is an overwhelmingly rural district with 91.5% of the population living in rural areas. Famous places in this area are Ulihatu, the birth place of Bhagwan Birsa Munda, and Dombari Buru, the central point of his activity.

Note: The map alongside presents some of the notable locations in the district. All places marked in the map are linked in the larger full screen map.

== Falls ==
In its bid to find its way through the hard and jagged terrain, the Banai River branches itself out in five different streams, generating ubiquitous singing rivulets through the cluster of rocks. Unlike Jonha and Hundru Falls, Panchghagh's water does not fall from great heights. Still, one can almost hear the roar of the water when one arrives near it, because all the five branched-out and swirling streams hit the rocks in a very turbulent manner. It's a treat to watch and hear.

In spite of the presence of a large number of high waterfalls in the area, the Panchghagh Falls are a tourists preference for being viewed as the safest of all. The water falls from a lesser height, making it safe for tourists to enjoy in the rapid flow of water. Most of the people arrive here for picnic with family and friends.

== Transport ==
Panchghagh Falls is 8 kilometres (5.0 mi) from Khunti on the road to chaibasa. It is 55 kilometres (34 mi) from Ranchi. Khunti is on NH 75 or Ranchi-Chaibasa Highway.

== See also ==
- List of waterfalls
- List of waterfalls in India
- List of waterfalls in India by height
- Ranchi travel guide from Wikivoyage
