= Semarsot Wildlife Sanctuary =

- IUCN category IV (habitat/species management area)
- Location within Chhattisgarh Location within India
- Interactive map of Semarsot Wildlife Sanctuary
- Nearest city: Ambikapur
- Coordinates: 23.54°N 83.53°E
- Area: 430.35 km^{2} (166.16 sq mi)
- Established: 1978

Semarsot Wildlife Sanctuary is a protected area and wildlife sanctuary located in Balrampur Ramanujganj district of the Indian state of Chhattisgarh.

== Geography ==
The sanctuary covers an area of 430.35 km^{2} (166.16 sq mi) and was declared as a protected area in 1978.

== Wildlife ==
The protected area consists of a mixture of moist and dry tropical deciduous forests. Major fauna include nilgai, spotted deer, sambar deer, chinkara, leopard, sloth bear, wild boar, and Indian fox. Avifauna include darters, wood peckers, peacocks, jungle fowl, green pigeons, quails, parrots, and storks. The park consists of reptiles such as common krait, cat snake, rat snake, snake-eyed lacerta, grass skink, fan throated lizard, and rock agama.
