= Jonha Falls =

- जोन्हा जलप्रपात
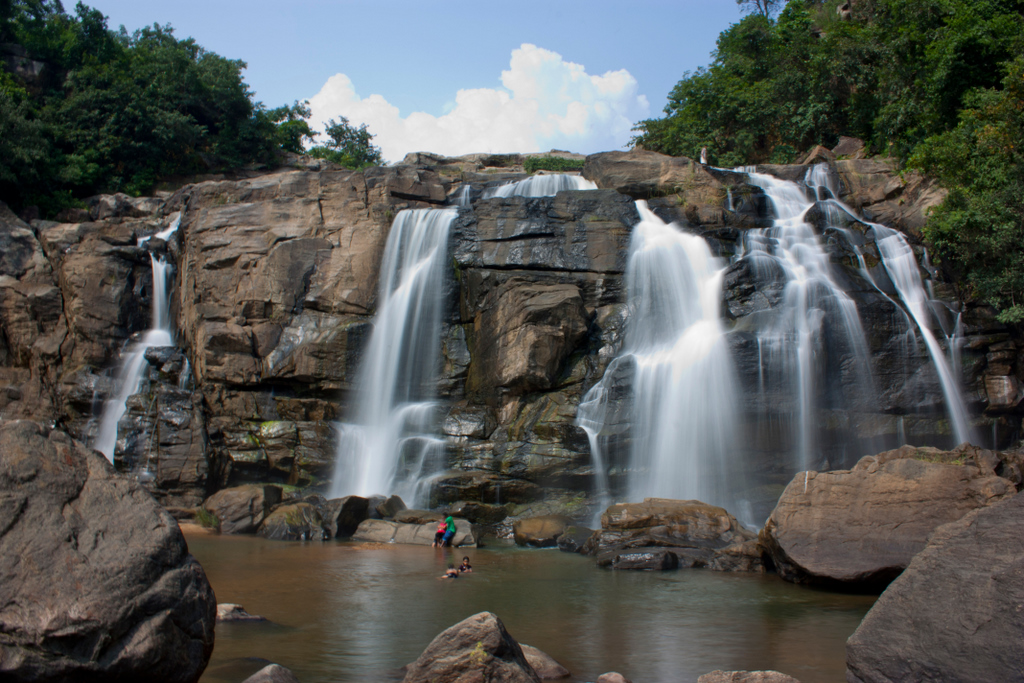

- Location within Jharkhand
- Location: Ranchi district, Jharkhand
- Coordinates: 23°20′30″N 85°36′30″E
- Total height: 43 metres (141 ft)
- Watercourse: Raru River

The Jonha Falls (also called Gautamdhara Falls) is a waterfall located in Ranchi district in the Indian state of Jharkhand. The best way to reach water fall without using 722 steps is through the Jonha Fall Resort Road.

== Geography ==
Cities, towns and locations in Ranchi district in South Chotanagpur Division
M: municipality, CT: census town, R: rural/ urban centre, N: neighbourhood, T: tourist centre, D: dam, H: historical/ religious centre
Owing to space constraints in the small map, the actual locations in a larger map may vary slightly

=== Location ===
Jonha Falls is located at 23°20′30″N 85°36′30″E

Note: The map alongside presents some of the notable locations in the district. All places marked in the map are linked in the larger full screen map. Jonha Fall can be seen without using 722 steps of stairs via Jonha Fall Resort.

== The falls ==
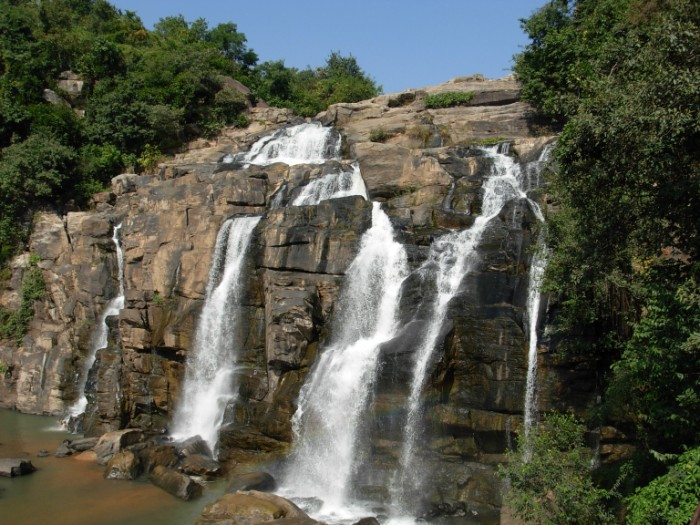
July 2010.

Situated at an edge of the Ranchi plateau, the Jonha Falls is an example of a hanging valley falls. The Gunga River hangs over its master stream, Radu River and forms the falls. One has to descend 722 steps to admire the surroundings. Water in the falls drops from a height of 43 metres (141 ft).

The Jonha Falls is an example of a Knickpoint caused by rejuvenation. It represents breaks in slopes in the longitudinal profile of a river caused by rejuvenation. The break in channel gradient allows water to fall vertically giving rise to a waterfall.

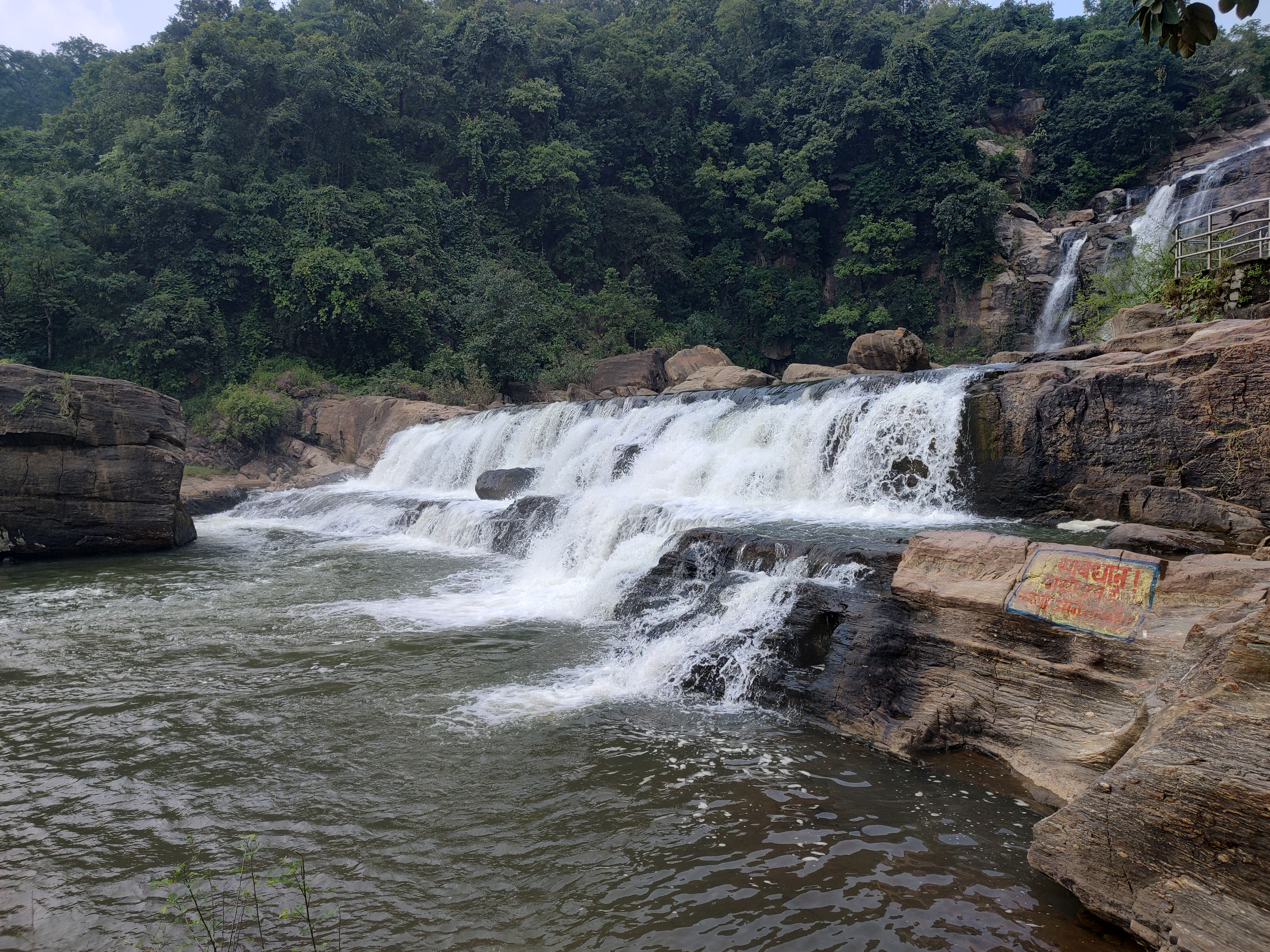
Jonha Falls

== Culture ==
There is a tourist rest house which encloses a Buddhist shrine with a deity of Lord Gautama Buddha. A temple and an ashram dedicated to Buddha was built atop Gautam Pahar by the sons of Baldeo Das Birla. A fair is organized in Jonha every Tuesday and Saturday.

Many remains of Buddhism are present in Jonha Falls, situated on Gautam Hill, 38 km away from the capital Ranchi. There is an ancient temple of Lord Gautam Buddha on the hill of Jonha Falls. This temple was built hundreds of years ago by Raja Baldev Das Birla.

== Transport ==
The Jonha Falls is 40 kilometres (25 mi) from Ranchi. It is approachable by both road and train. Jonha Station is just 1.5 km from the fall. For travel by road, one has to take the Ranchi-Purulia Road and after travelling for about 20 miles (32 km) one has to travel about 3 miles (4.8 km) off the main road.

== See also ==
- List of waterfalls
- List of waterfalls in India
- List of waterfalls in India by height
