= History of Jharkhand =

History of a region of India

The region have been inhabited since the Stone Age. Copper tools from the Chalcolithic period have been discovered. This area entered the Iron Age during the mid-2nd millennium BCE.

The region was conquered by the Maurya Empire, in 14th century Sultan Alaudin Khiliji (1266–1301) of Khandesh conquered it and later (17th century) came under the control of the Mughal emperors Akbar. Following the Mughal decline, the region came under the control of local rulers from the Chero caste and others, before its subjugation by the British East India Company in the late 18th century, succeeded by the British Raj from the mid-19th century, both encountering much local resistance. At this time the territory was covered by nine princely states. Under the Raj, till 1905, the region fell within the Bengal Presidency, most of it then being transferred to the Central Provinces and Orissa Tributary States; then in 1936 the whole region was assigned to the Eastern States Agency.

Following Indian independence in 1947, the region was divided between the new states of Madhya Pradesh, Orissa, and Bihar. In 2000 a campaign led by the Jharkhand Mukti Morcha (JMM) for a separate state culminated with the passage of the Bihar Reorganisation Act, creating Jharkhand as a new Indian state.

== Prehistoric era ==
Stone tools and microliths from the Mesolithic and Neolithic periods have been discovered in the Chota Nagpur Plateau region. There are also ancient cave paintings in Isko, Hazaribagh district which are from the Meso-Chalcolithic period (9,000–5,000 BC). A group of megaliths proven to date back to beyond 3000 BCE was also found at Barkagaon, about 25 km from Hazaribagh at Punkri Barwadih.

During 2nd millennium BCE the use of Copper tools spread in Chota Nagpur Plateau and these find complex are known as the Copper Hoard Culture. In the Kabra-Kala mound, at the confluence of the Son and North Koel rivers in Palamu district, various objects have been found which date from the Neolithic to the medieval period. The pot-sherds of redware, black and red ware, black ware, black slipware and NBP ware are from the Chalcolithic to the late medieval period.

== Ancient period ==
Barudih, located in the Singhbhum district of Jharkhand, yielded evidence of microliths, Neolithic celts, iron slags, wheel made pottery, and iron objects (including a sickle). The earliest radio carbon dating give a range of 1401–837 BCE for this site.

Magadha and other Mahajanapadas in the Post Vedic period

Around c. 1200–1000 BCE, Vedic Aryans spread eastward to the fertile western Ganges plain and adopted iron tools, which allowed for the clearing of forest and the adoption of a more settled, agricultural way of life. During this time, the central Ganges Plain was dominated by a related but non-Vedic Indo-Aryan culture. The end of the Vedic period witnessed the rise of cities and large states (called mahajanapadas), as well as śramaṇa movements (including Jainism and Buddhism) which challenged the Vedic orthodoxy of Brahminical Hinduism. According to Bronkhorst, the Sramana culture arose in "greater Magadha," which was Indo-European, but not Vedic. In this culture, Kshatriyas were placed higher than Brahmins, and it rejected Vedic authority and rituals.

In Mahabharata, the region was referred as Kark Khand due to its location near Tropic of Cancer. In those days, the Jharkhand state was a part of Magadha and Anga. Nanda Empire ruled the region during 4th century BCE. In Mauryan period, this region was ruled by a number of states, which were collectively known as the Atavika (forest) states. These conquered states fell under the hegemony of the Maurya empire during Ashoka's expansionist reign (c. 232 BCE). The Brahmi Inscription found in Karbakala in Palamu district and Saridkel in Khunti district which is from 3rd century BCE. In ancient site of Saridkel, burnt bricks houses, red ware pottery, copper tools, coins and iron tools were found which belong to early centuries CE.

Samudragupta, while marching through the present-day Chota Nagpur region (North and South), directed the first attack against the kingdom of Dakshina Kosala in the Mahanadi valley.

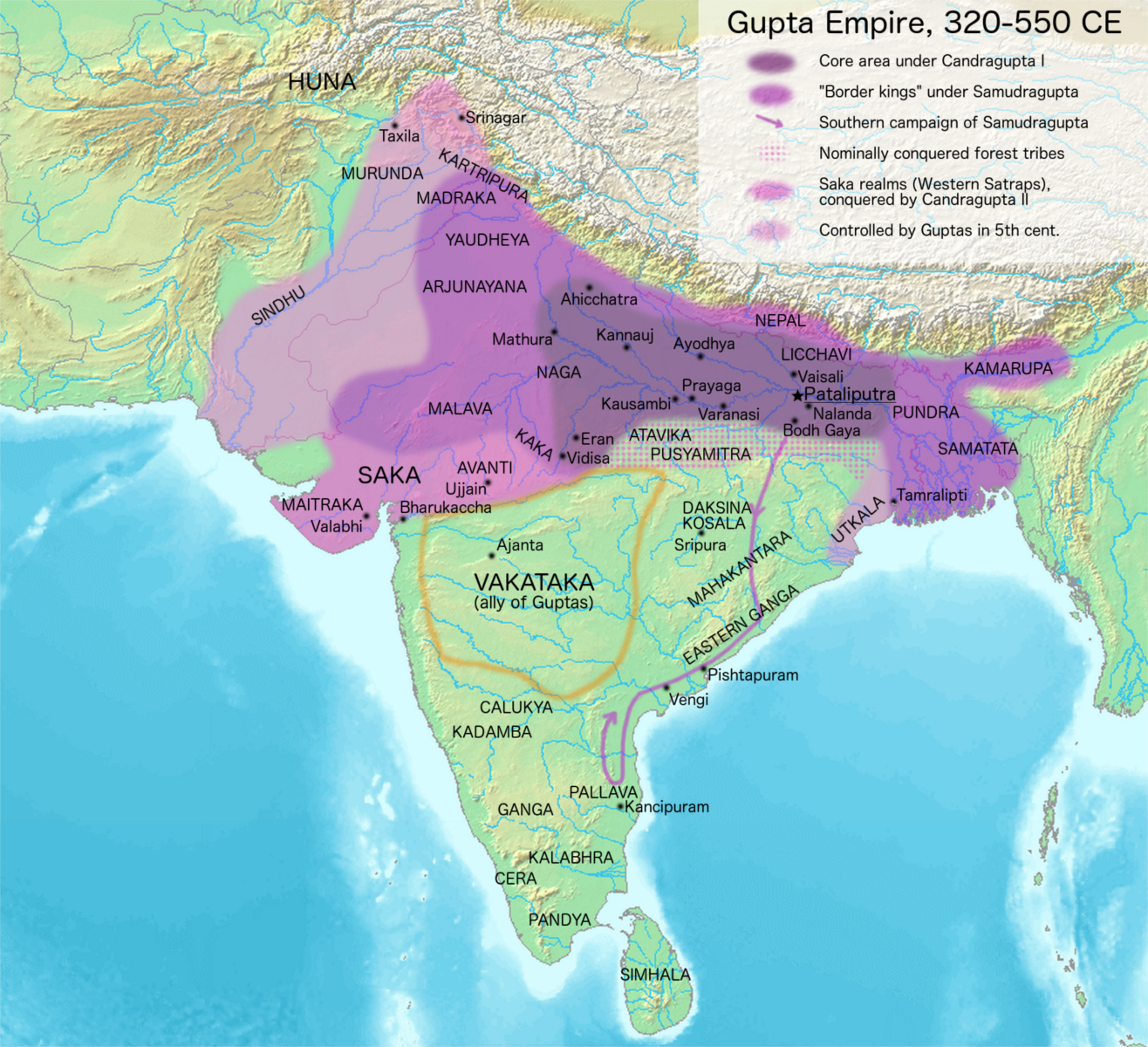
Gupta Empire

== Medieval period ==
In the 7th century, Chinese traveler Xuanzang passed through the region. He described the kingdom as Karnasuvarna and Shashanka as its ruler. To the north of the kingdom was Magadha, Champa was in East, Mahendra in the west, and Orissa in the south. The region was also part of Pala Empire. A Buddhist monastery has been discovered in Hazaribagh which was built during Pala rule in 10th century. Bhim Karn was Nagvanshi king during medieval period. He defeated Raksel dynasty of Surguja when they Invaded the reign with cavalry.

The medieval Jharkhand region was not much affected by the Muslim invasions due to its remoteness. Rohtasgarh in southern Bihar was the furthest limit of Delhi Sultanate expansion during the medieval period, and although there was some conflict with Palamu, the interior portion of the plateau saw little Muslim activity. However the eastern part of Santal Parganas, namely the region around the Rajmahal Hills, was deemed of high strategic importance as it controlled access to Bengal from the direction of Bihar, including along the Ganga river, via the Teliagarhi Pass.

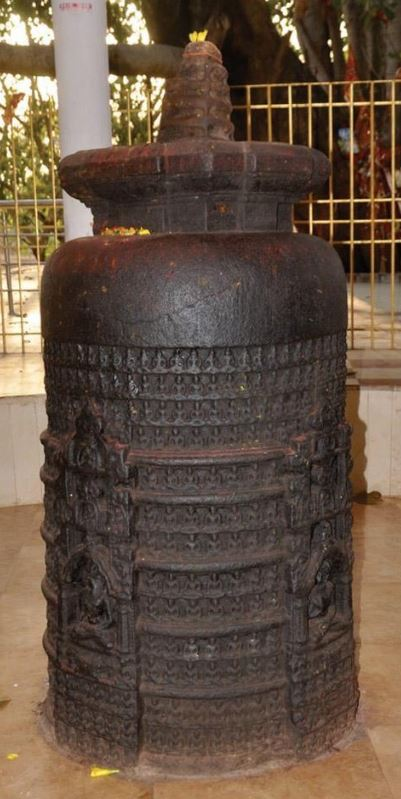
This is the Sahastrakoot Jinaya (1008 the Temple of Jain statues) at Bhadrakali in Itkhori (10th Tirthankar the birthplace of Shitalnath). It is worshipped by assuming the Sahasrara shivling

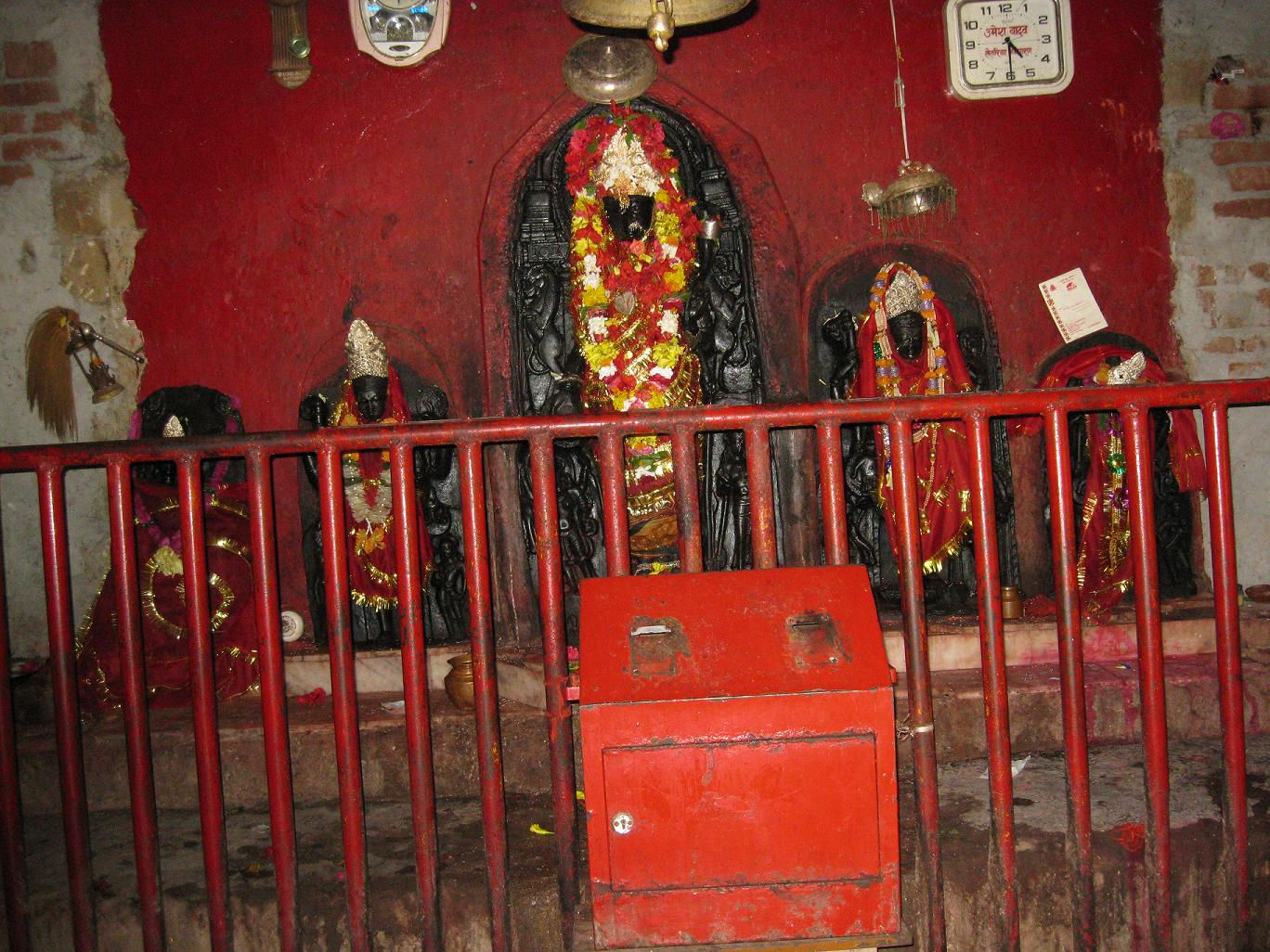
Idols of Bhadrakali temple in Itkhori

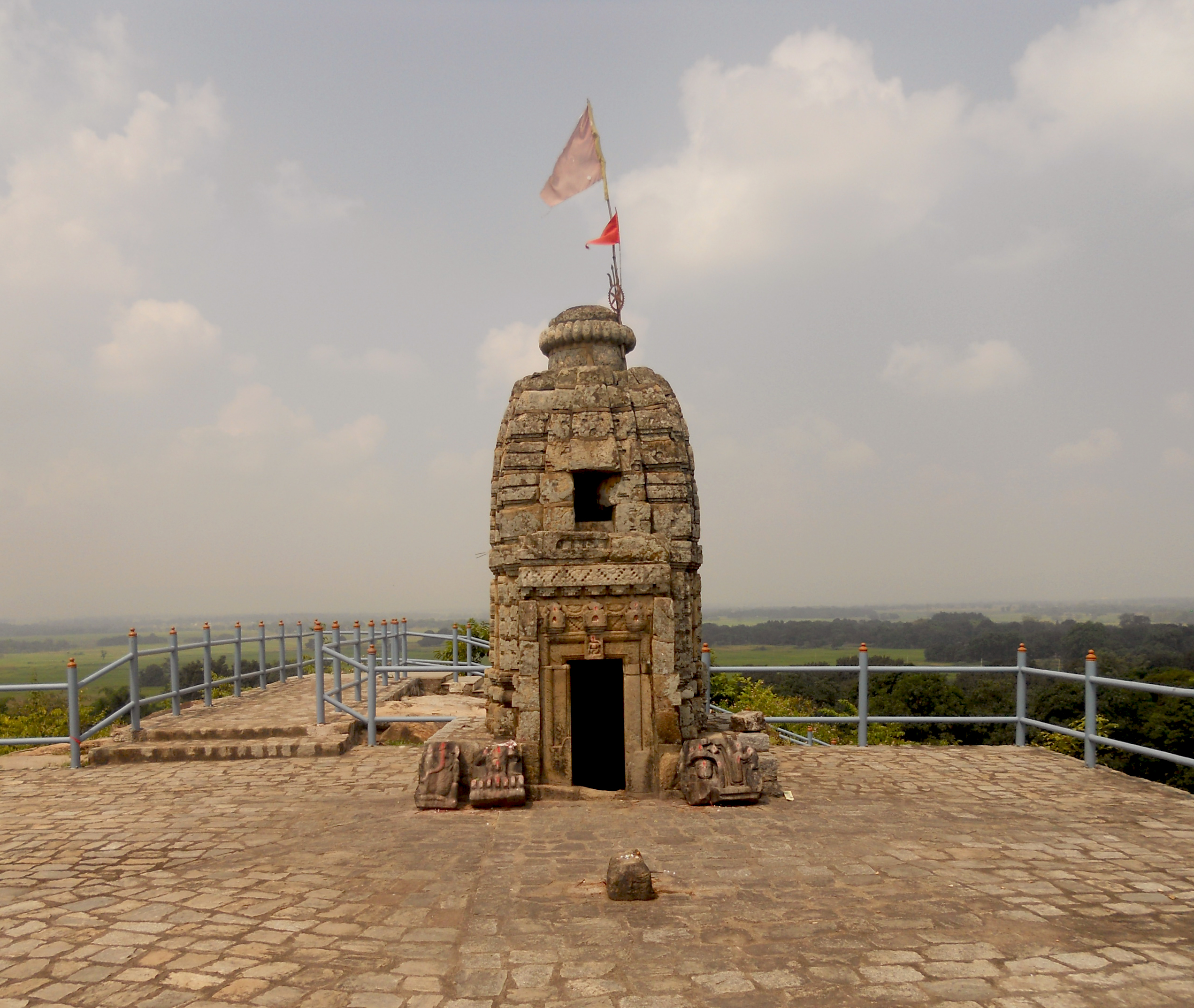
Khakparta Temple, 9th century Shiva temple in Lohardaga

== Modern period ==
By the end of medieval and the beginning of the modern period, this region was under the rule of many dynasties including Nagvanshi, Khayaravala, Namudag Raj, Ramgarh Raj, Raksel, Chero, Raj Dhanwar and the Kharagdiha estates of Koderma, Palganj, Ledo, and Sreerampur, amongst others.

In Akbarnama, the region of Chota Nagpur is described as Jharkhand. Sher Shah, when he conquered Bengal, had carried off his loot from Gaur to Rohtas by way of Jharkhand. Sher Shah also combined forces with Ujjainiya Rajputs to expel Mahrath Chero, the ruler of Palamu, from Rohtasgarh and the southern part of present Bihar, presumably the latest victory in a long series of Chero-Afghan rivalry. The Chero ruler later failed to pay tribute in grain to Sher Shah during his campaign against Humayun, and was thus invaded and defeated by Sher Shah's lieutenant Khawas Khan Marwat. Sher Shah also sought to use Jharkhand as a lesser backdoor between his base in southwest Bihar to western Bengal, and this became known to the Mughals and brought Jharkhand towards the attention of the Mughal rulers.

During the Mughal period, the region, then known as Khukhra, was famous for its diamonds. Akbar was informed of a rebel Afghan sardar, Junaid Kararani, whose hideout was Chota Nagpur. The Emperor also received information on diamonds being found in this area. Consequently, Akbar ordered Shahbaz Khan Kamboh to attack Khukhra. At that time, Raja Madhu Singh, the 42nd Nagvanshi king was ruling at Khukhra. Akbar's army defeated the king and a sum of rupees six thousand was fixed as its annual revenue payable to the Mughals. Till the reign of Akbar, Chota Nagpur had not come under the suzerainty of the Mughals and the Nagvanshi rulers had been ruling over this region as independent rulers.

The far northeastern part of present Jharkhand was also an important centre of Mughal authority. After the Mughal conquest of western Bengal in 1576, the town of Rajmahal became the initial capital of the Bengal Subah in 1595. Rajmahal, located near the pass through the hills and on the Ganga, was an ideal initial capital. The Mughals built many buildings in the city including a Diwan-e-Aam, Diwan-e-Khas, and many palaces and tanks.The capital of the Bengal Subah was shifted to Dhaka to deal with piracy and continuing resistance to Mughal rule in eastern Bengal, but Rajmahal remained important as controlling the Ganga as it turned from Bihar to Bengal.

By the advent of the reign of Emperor Jahangir, king Durjan Shah had come to power in Chota Nagpur. He refused to pay the annual revenue fixed by Akbar. Jahangir ordered Ibrahim Khan (governor of Bihar) to attack Khukhra. Jahangir's intentions were two-pronged: defeat Durjan Shah and acquire the diamonds found in the Sankh River. In 1615 AD, Ibrahim Khan marched against Khukhra and defeated Durjan Shah, took him as a captive to Patna, and was finally imprisoned in the Gwalior fort. The imprisonment lasted for twelve years. Ultimately, Jahangir granted his release after realising Sal's skill of distinguishing real diamonds. The title of Shah was conferred on him by Emperor Jahangir and his kingdom restored. Durjan Shah shifted the capital from Khukhragarh to Doisa, also known as Navratangarh. The reign of Durjan Sal lasted for about thirteen years. He died in 1639 or 1640 AD. He was succeeded by King Ram Shah ruled from 1640 to 1663. He built Kapilnath Temple in 1643. He succeeded by his son Raghunath Shah. Thakur Ani Nath Shahdeo built Jagannath temple of Ranchi in 1691.

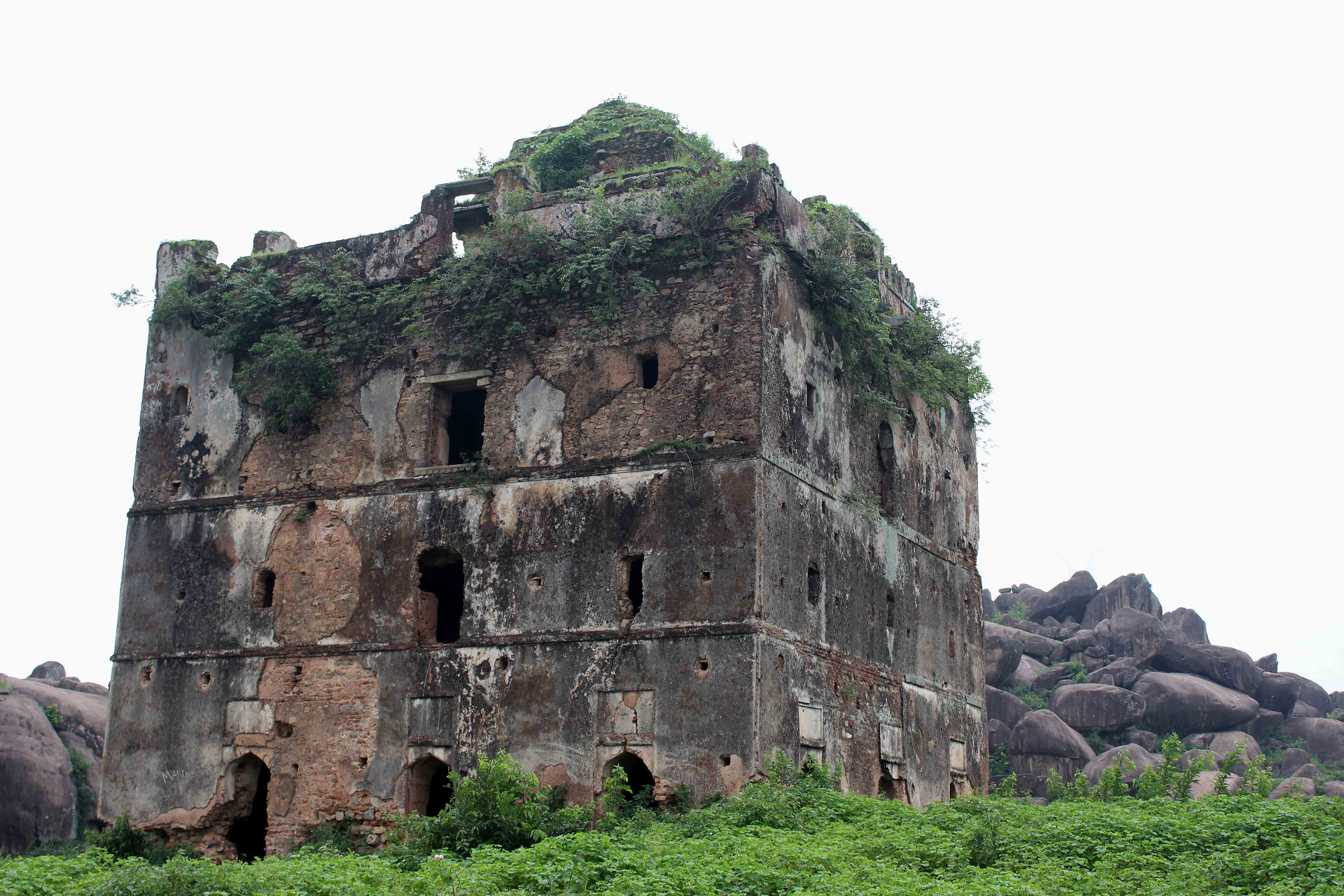
Navratangarh fort

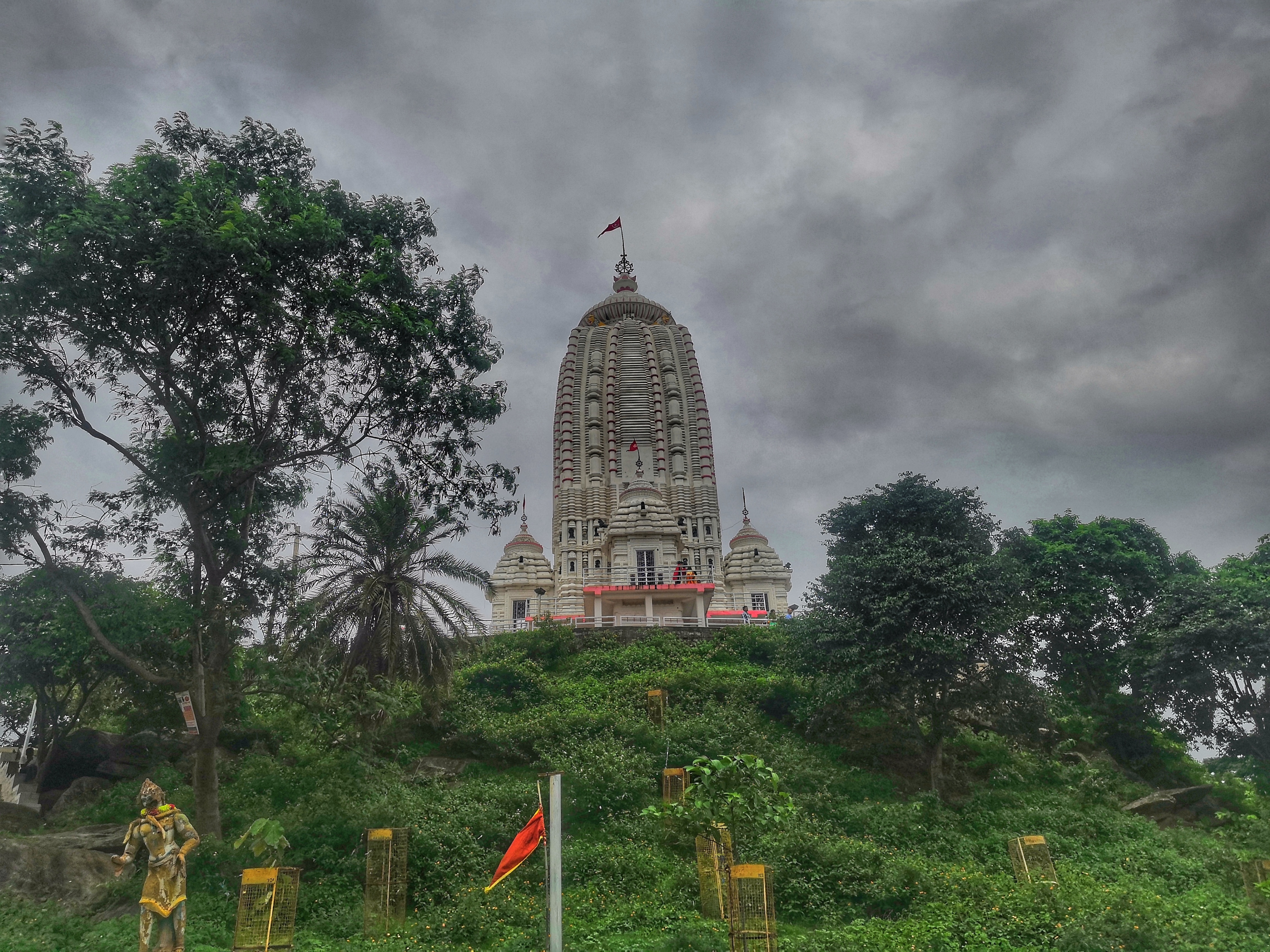
Jagannath temple at Ranchi built by king Ani Nath Shahdeo

In Palamu district, the old fort in the plains, was built by the King of Raksel Rajput Dynasty. However, it was during the reign of King Medini Ray (1658–1674), who ruled from 1658 to 1674 in Palamau, the old fort was rebuilt into a defensive structure. His rule extended to areas in South Gaya and Hazaribagh. He attacked Navratangarh (33 miles (53 km)) and defeated it. With the war bounty, he constructed the lower fort close to Satbarwa. Following the death of Medini Ray, there was rivalry within the royal family of the Chero dynasty which ultimately led to its downfall; this was engineered by the ministers and advisers in the court.

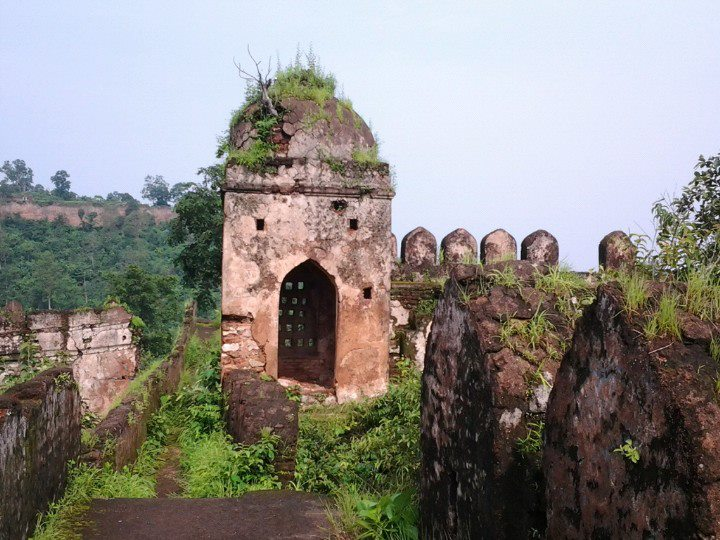
The present structure of the Palamau Fort was built in the 17th century CE.

Daud Khan, who launched his invasion on 3 April 1660 from Patna, attacked south of Gaya district and finally arrived at the Palamu forts on 9 December 1660. The terms of surrender and payment of tribute were not acceptable to the Cheros; Daud Khan apparently wanted complete conversion of the Hindus to Islam. Following this, Khan mounted a series of attacks on the forts. Cheros defended the forts but ultimately lost and fled to the jungles. The temples were destroyed and Mughal rule was re-imposed.

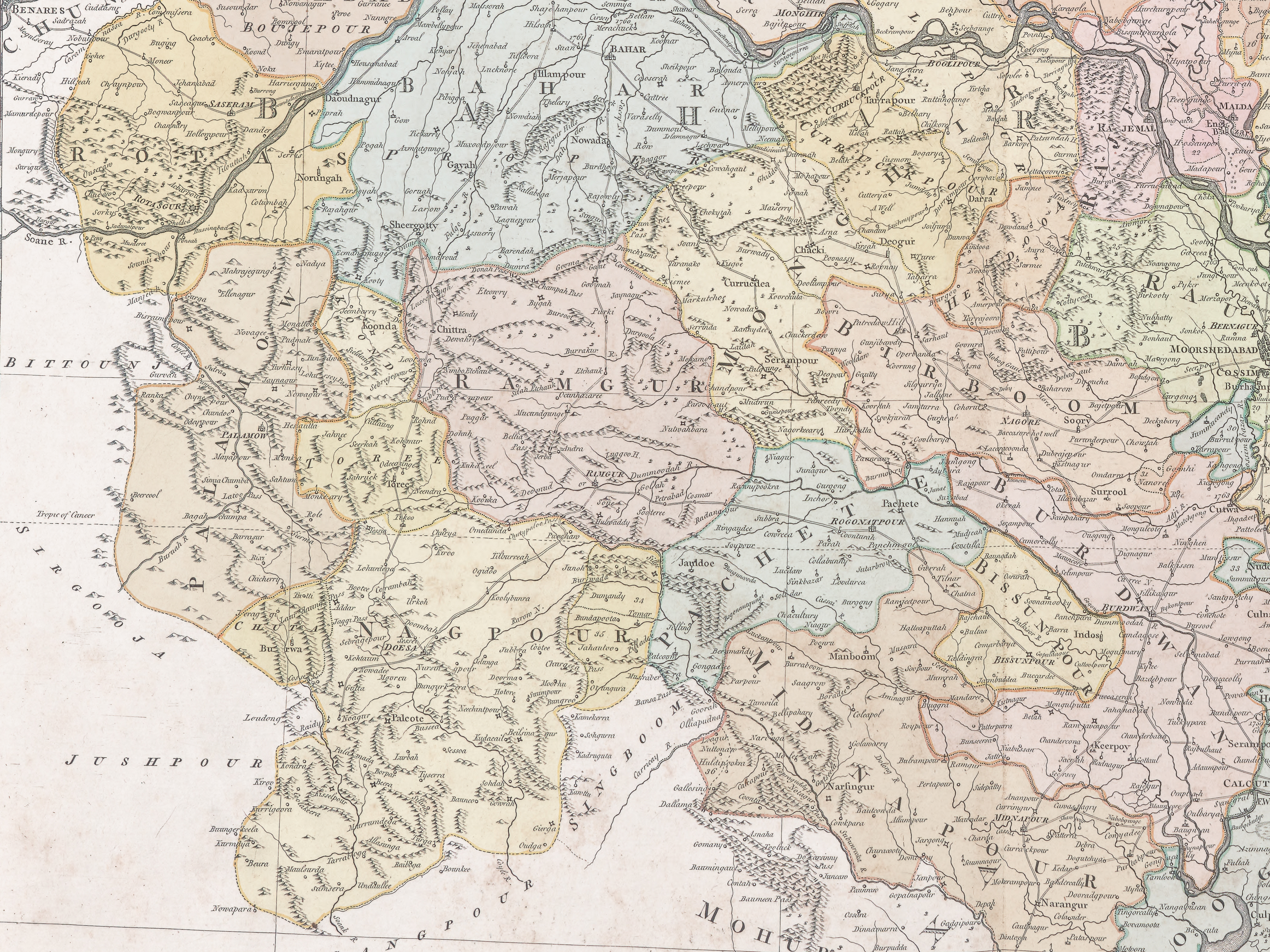
Administrative jurisdictions in 1770s

In 1765, the region came under the control of the British East India Company when Chitrajeet Rai's nephew, Gopal Rai, betrayed him and facilitated the Patna council of the East India Company to attack the fort. When the new fort was attacked by Captain Camac on 28 January 1771, the Chero soldiers fought valiantly but had to retreat to the old fort on account of water shortage. This helped the British army to occupy the new fort located on a hill without any struggle. The location was strategic and enabled the British to mount cannon-supported attacks on the old fort. The Cheros fought valiantly with their own cannons but the old fort was besieged by the British on 19 March 1771. The fort was finally occupied by the British in 1772. Subsequently the regions of Nagvansh, Ramgarh and Kharagdiha also became parts of British Raj.

The Kharagdiha kingdom, which was founded in 15th century when the Vishnuvridhi Bhumihars were able to influence and impress the ghatwals of Kharagdiha Gadis, also came under the British Raj. After the Treaty of Allahabad, this region, along with the rest of Suba Bengal, came under the rule of East India Company. The Hazaribagh Gazetteer describes this kingdom 600 miles long which spread from Hazaribagh to Gaya. The Kharagdiha gadis were semi-independent chiefdoms. All that the ruler of the Gadi had to do on succession was to acknowledge the supremacy of the Kharagdiha Maharaja. Koderma, Palganj, Ledo, Ghoranji, Srerampur, and Sirsia were notable gadis.

During the British Raj, Kharagdiha became a part of Jungle Terry. The Gadis of Kharagdiha were permanently settled and they became Zamindari estates. The rulers of Kharagdiha were separately settled the zamindari estate of Raj Dhanwar in 1809. There was a total of 84 divisions of Kharagdiha called gadis, but 33 of these were transferred to other Perganas, there were only 51 of these left who paid their rent through 36 toujis, and all of the gadidars/ ghatwals received Mukarrari Pattas from the Collector at different times. And in 1809, the remainder of Kharagdiha Perganan consisting of 54 villages was settled permanently with Girwar Narayan Deo on a revenue of Rs 5,226-12-10. This completed the settlement of Kharagdiha by creating 50 Permanent Mukarrari Gadis/ Mahals and one Permanently Settled Estate. Subsequently, the pargana contained, among its various classes of landholding, 20 Shamilat Taluks and 58 further Mukarrari Taluks created under written engagements, by 1877.

Other princely states in the Chota Nagpur Plateau came within the sphere of influence of the Maratha Empire, but they became tributary states of East India Company as a result of the Anglo-Maratha Wars known as Chota Nagpur Tributary States.

== Colonial era ==
Then part of the larger Bengal Presidency, came under British control after the Battle of Plassey (1757) and Battle of Buxar (1764). The region, rich in natural resources and forest wealth, became an important area for British economic interests.

- 1766–1809: Chuar revolt by the Bhumij zamindars and paiks of Dhalbhum and Barabhum.
- 1772–1780: Paharia revolt
- 1780–1785: Tilka Manjhi led the tribal revolt.
- 1795–1800: Tamar revolt
- 1795–1800: Munda revolt under the leadership of Bishnu Manki.
- 1800–1802: Munda revolt under the leadership of Dukhan Manki of Tamar
- 1812: Bakhtar Say and Mundal Singh rebelled against British East India company in Gumla.
- 1819–1820: Chero revolt in Palamu under the leadership of Bhukan Singh.
- 1831–1832: Kol revolt under the leadership of Bindrai Manki and Budhu Bhagat.
- 1832–1833: Bhumij revolt under the leadership of Ganga Narayan Singh of Jungle Mahals.
- 1855: Santhals revolt against the revenue of Lord Cornwallis.

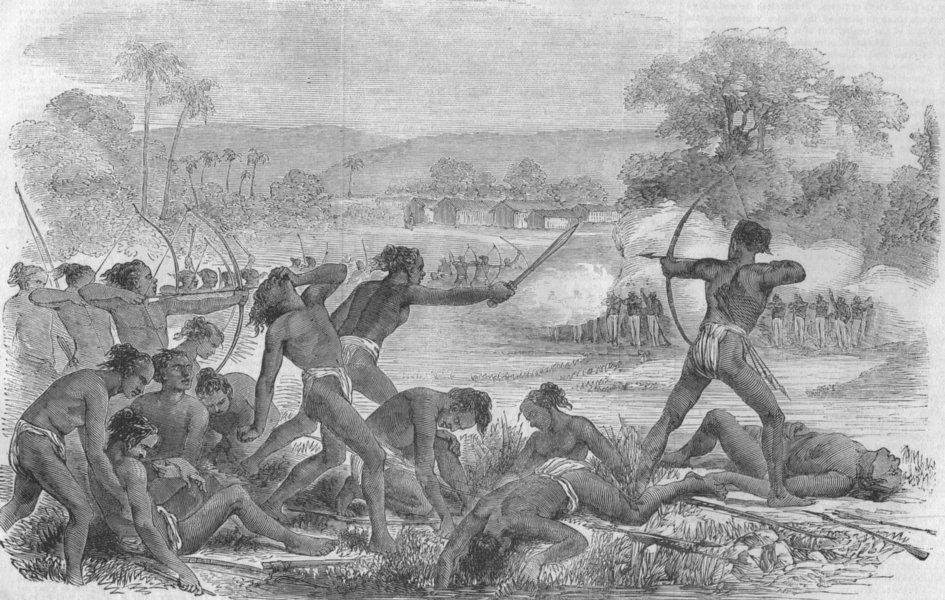
Santhal Rebellion, c. 1856, from the Illustrated London News

- 1855–1860: During the late 1850s, Sidhu had accumulated about ten thousand Santhal to run a parallel government against British rule. The basic purpose was to collect taxes by making his own laws. British Government had announced an award of Rs. 10,000 to arrest Sidhu and his brother Kanhu
- 1856–1857: Thakur Vishwanath Shahdeo, Pandey Ganpat Rai, Tikait Umrao Singh, Sheikh Bhikhari, Nadir Ali, Jai Mangal Singh led a movement against the British Government during India's First War of Independence, 1857, also called Sepoy Mutiny.
- 1857: Nilambar and Pitambar led a revolt against East India company.
- 1868: Kharwar revolt under the leadership of Bhagirath, Dubai Gosai, and Patel Singh.

After the Indian Rebellion of 1857, the rule of the British East India Company was transferred to the Crown in the person of Queen Victoria, who, in 1876, was proclaimed Empress of India. In 1874, the Kherwar Movement under the leadership of Bhagirathi Manjhi gained prominence. The Cheros and Kharwars again rebelled against the British in 1882 but the attack was repulsed. Between 1895 and 1900, a movement against the British Raj was led by Birsa Munda (born 15 November 1875). Birsa Munda was captured by British forces and declared dead on 9 June 1900 in the Ranchi Jail, due to Cholera, according to records of the British colonial government. All of these uprisings were quelled by the British through massive deployment of troops across the region.

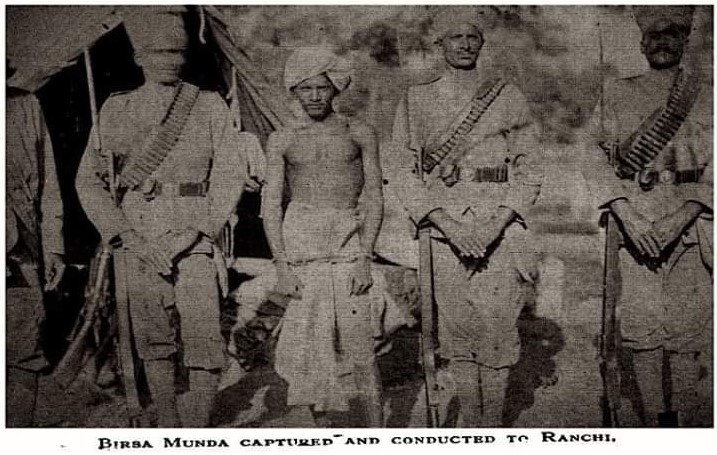
Birsa Munda captured and conducted to Ranchi

In 1914, the Tana Bhagat resistance movement started, which gained the participation of more than 26,000 Adivasis, and eventually merged with Mahatma Gandhi's Satyagraha and Civil Disobedience movement.

In October 1905, the exercise of British influence over the predominantly Hindi-speaking states of Chang Bhakar, Jashpur, Koriya, Surguja, and Udaipur was transferred from the Bengal government to that of the Central Provinces, while the two Oriya-speaking states of Gangpur and Bonai were attached to the Orissa Tributary States, leaving only Kharsawan and Saraikela answerable to the Bengal governor.

In 1936, all nine states were transferred to the Eastern States Agency, the officials of which came under the direct authority of the Governor-General of India, rather than under that of any Provinces.

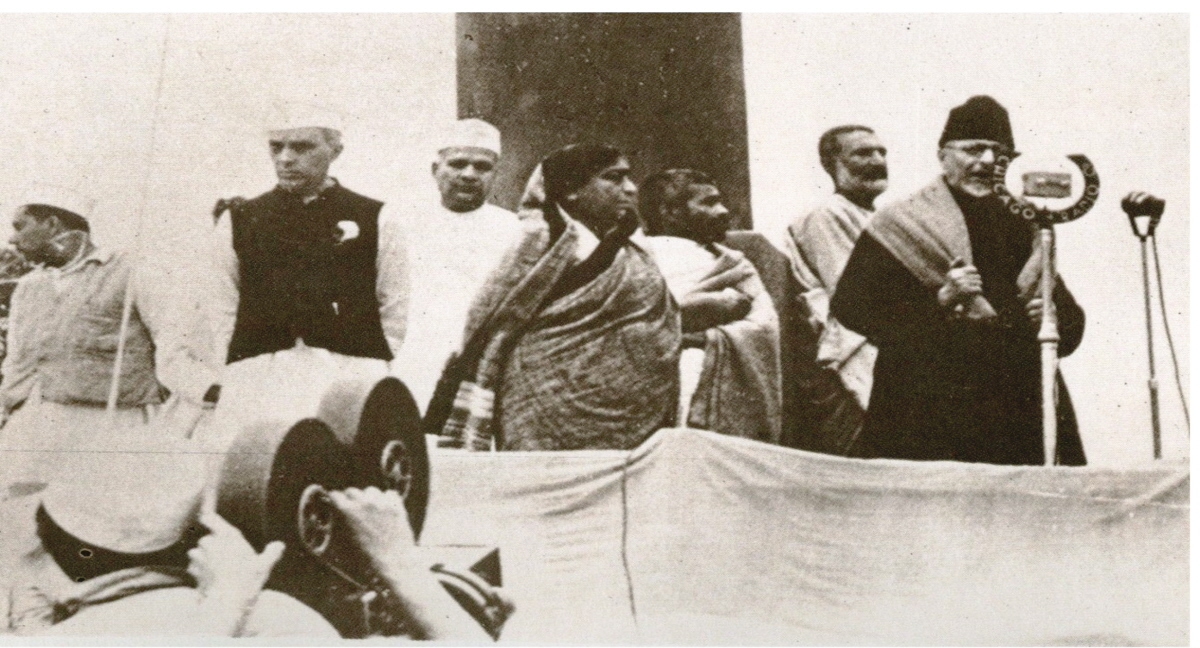
Jawaharlal Nehru, Jamnalal Bajaj, Sarojini Naidu, Khan Abdul Ghaffar Khan, and Maulana Azad at the 1940 Ramgarh Session of the Indian National Congress

In March 1940, INC 53rd Session was accomplished under the presidency of Maulana Abul Qalam Azad at Jhanda Chowk, Ramgarh (now, Ramgarh Cant.). Mahatma Gandhi, Jawaharlal Nehru, Sardar Patel, Dr. Rajendra Prasad, Sarojini Naidu, Khan Abdul Ghaffar Khan, Acharya J.B. Kripalani, Industrialist Jamnalal Bajaj and other leaders of Indian freedom movement attended the Ramgarh session. Mahatma Gandhi also opened khadi and village industries exhibition at Ramgarh.

== Post-independence ==
After the Indian independence in 1947, the rulers of the states chose to accede to the Dominion of India. Changbhakar, Jashpur, Koriya, Surguja, and Udaipur States became part of Madhya Pradesh state; Gangpur and Bonai became part of Orissa state; and Kharsawan and Saraikela became part of Bihar state.

In 1928, Unnati Samaj, the political wing of Christian tribals submitted a memorandum to the Simon Commission to constitute a tribal state in Eastern India. A prominent leader like Jaipal Singh Munda and Ram Narayan Singh demanded a separate state. In 1955, Jharkhand Party, led by Jaipal Singh Munda, submitted a memorandum to States Reorganization Commission for Jharkhand state for tribals, but it was rejected because the region had different languages, the tribals were in minority, Hindustani was majority language and adverse effect on economy of Bihar.

Later Sadan people, the native various caste groups also joined the movement for separate state which strengthen the movement. In 1972, Binod Bihari Mahato, Shibu Soren and A. K. Roy founded Jharkhand Mukti Morcha (JMM). Nirmal Mahto, Prabhakar Tirkey, Surya Singh Besara, Deosharan Bhagat and Praveen Prabhakar founded All Jharkhand Students Union (AJSU) in 1986. They gave a new momentum to the separate state movement of Jharkhand.

The Jharkhand Coordination Committee (JCC) led by Ram Dayal Munda, Dr. B.P. Keshri, Binod Bihari Mahato, Santosh Rana, Surya Singh Besra and Deosharan Bhagat tried to coordinate between different parties.In 1988 Dr. B.P. Keshri sent a memorandum to form Jharkhand state to Central Government.

In July 1988, Bharatiya Janata party in the leadership of Atal Bihari Vajpayee, Lal Krishna Advani and Murli Manohar Joshi decided to demand separate state Vananchal composed of tribal regions of South Bihar. Inder Singh Namdhari, Samresh Singh and Rudra Pratap Sarangi were prominent leaders who organised several rallies to form a separate state Vananchal.

The Centre government formed a Committee on the Jharkhand Matter in 1989. It stressed the need for greater allocation of the development funds for the area. JMM was contended with greater representation but AJSU stuck to its original demand of separate state. Due to differences, these parties parted from each other.

To pressurize the government to concede a separate state, AJSU introduced elements of violence in the movement and called for a complete boycott of the elections.On the other hand, JMM contested and won the elections. Jharkhand Area Autonomous Council (JAAC) Bill passed in Bihar legislative assembly in December 1994. JAAC was given the charge of 40 subjects including agriculture, rural health, public work, public health, and minerals. JAAC had the power to recommend legislation to the Assembly and to frame bylaws and regulations.

In 1998, the Union government decided to send the Bill concerning formation of Jharkhand State to Bihar Legislative Assembly to which Lalu Prasad Yadav had famously remarked –“The state would be divided over my dead body”. BJP, JMM, AJSU, Congress, a total of 16 political parties came together on one platform and formed 'All Party Separate State Formation Committee' to start the movement. The voting on Jharkhand Act was to be done on 21 September 1998 in Bihar legislation. On that day JMM and AJSU called for Jharkhand Bandh and organised a protest march.

In 1999, Bharatiya Janata party, promised to form separate state Vananchal, if it wins the state election. After the last Assembly election in the state resulted in a hung assembly, RJD's dependence on the Congress extended support on the precondition that RJD would not pose a hurdle to the passage of the Bihar reorganisation bill .

Finally, with the support from both RJD and Congress, the ruling coalition at the Centre led by the BJP which had made statehood a policy plank in the region in several previous elections, cleared the Bihar Reorganisation Act in the monsoon session of the Parliament in 2000, thus paving the way for the creation of a separate Jharkhand state comprising Chota Nagpur Division and Santhal Pargana Division of South Bihar. NDA formed the government with Babulal Marandi as chief minister. Later it was renamed as Jharkhand.

== Post state formation ==
Jharkhand's 23rd Foundation Day celebrated on 15 November 2023, completed 23 years. Preparations had been outstanding for the program to be organized on November 15 on the occasion of Jharkhand's 23rd Foundation Day.

== See also ==
- List of Monuments of National Importance in Jharkhand
- Jharkhand movement
- Jharkhand Mukti Morcha
