= Puralmal Singh Chandel =

Puran Mal
- Raja
- Reign: 16th century
- Predecessor: Bariar Singh
- Born: Gidhaur
- Issue: Hari Singh
- Dynasty: Gidhaur chieftaincy
- Religion: Hinduism

Puran Mal was king of Gidhaur in the 16th century. He was contemporary of Mughal Emperor Akbar. According to legend, he restored Baidyanath Temple of Deoghar.

== Reign ==
His previous generation supported Sher Shah Suri against the Mughal. In 1580 he supported rebellion against the Mughal by Masum Khan Kabuli. He clashed with the chief of Kharagpur Raj, Sangram Singh. After suppressing therebellion, he supported the Mughal expedition led by Shahbaz Khan Kamboh against the Afghans in Bengal and Odisha.

Puran Mal was successful in befriending Shahbaz Kamboh. He attacked Sangram Singh of Kharagpur. Sangram Singh had to seek shelter in the forest. Puran Mal became powerful. When a Rajput follower of Puran Mal allied with Sangram Singh and attempted to kill Shahbaz Khan Kamboh, he killed another person. Shahbaz Khan Kamboh imprisoned Puran Mal. Later the assailant was arrested and killed and Puran Mal was released. Shahbaz Khan Kamboh was transferred to Bengal from Bihar by Mughal. Sangram Singh again became king of Kharagpur. Later Puran Mal became independent from the empire.

Raja Man Singh was able to make Sangram Singh and Puran Mal as tributary of Mughal. In 1591, he participated in the Mughal expedition against Qutlugh Khan Lohani of Odisha with Sangram Singh of Kharagpur, Rupnarain Sisodiah, Man Singh, Yousuf Shah Chak, the ex-ruler of Kashmir and Madhu Karn Shah of Khukhra.

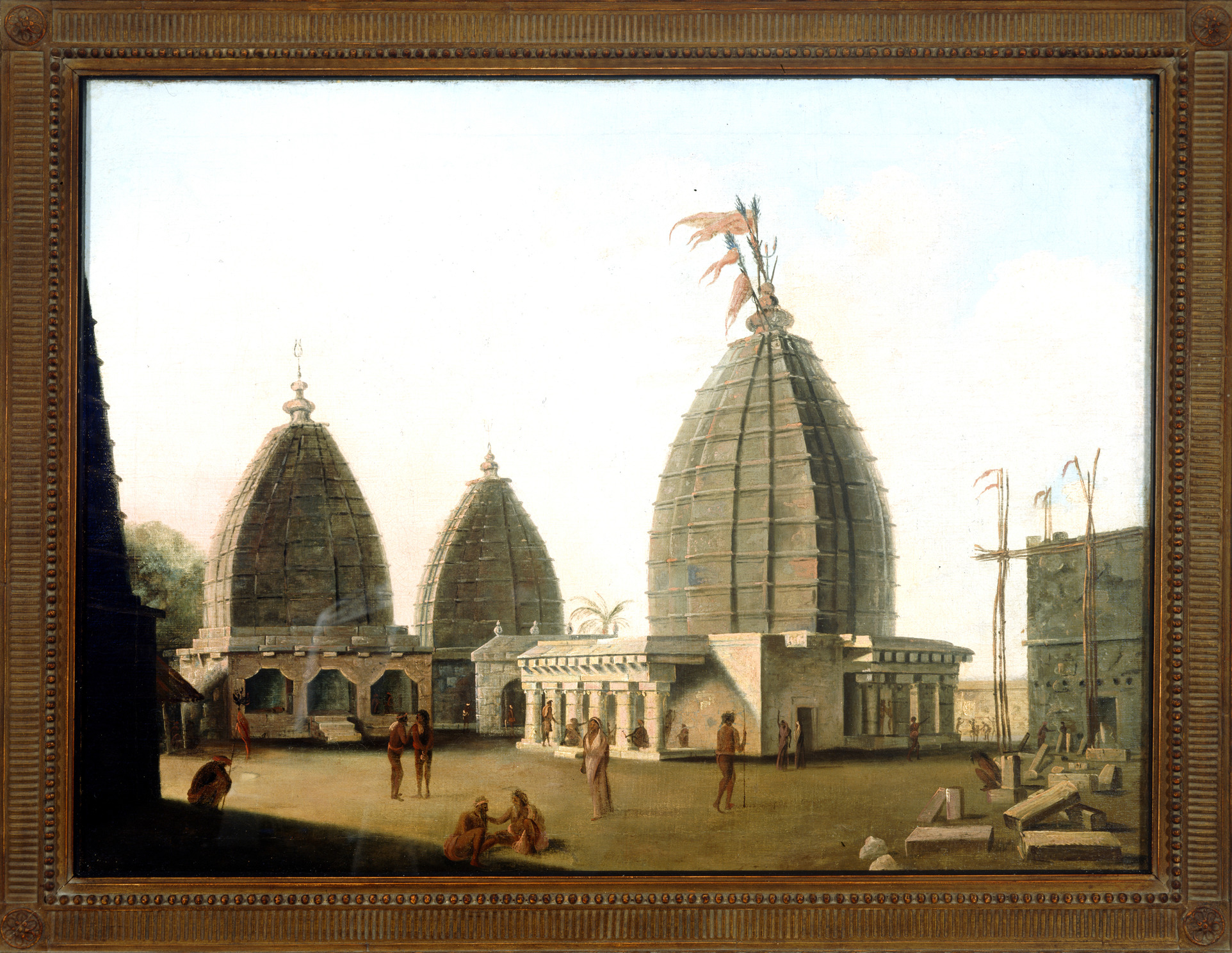
canvas painting of Baidhnath temple by William Hodges, 1782

According to legend, He restored Baidyanath Temple in Deoghar.
