= Baghochia =

Bhumihar ruling house associated with Huseypur and its successor estates

The Baghochia dynasty, also known as the House of Baghoch, was the ruling house of the erstwhile kingdom of Huseypur–Kalyanpur, centred in the Saran region of Bihar and extending into parts of present-day eastern Uttar Pradesh. Huseypur–Kalyanpur was subdued by the Mughal Empire in the latter half of the 16th century. Its hereditary rulers continued to be styled Raja or Maharaja and held Huseypur until the chieftaincy came to an end in the late 18th century. Maharaja Fateh Bahadur Sahi, one of its later rulers, resisted the East India Company after it acquired the Diwani of Bengal, Bihar and Orissa in 1765.

After the end of Huseypur–Kalyanpur, different branches of the Baghochia family held or acquired zamindaris and other landed estates in Bihar, eastern Uttar Pradesh and present-day Jharkhand. These included Hathwa Raj, Tamkuhi Raj , Ledo Estate, Salemgarh Estate, Sursand Estate and Kiajori Estate.

The family genealogy appears in the records of the 1867 case Baboo Beer Pertab Sahee v. Maharajah Rajender Pertab Sahee, known as the Great Hathwa Case, and was later recorded by G. N. Dutt. Dutt identifies Baghoch and Bharhichowra as early seats of the family in the Gorakhpur region. The family is traditionally identified with the Vats gotra of Bhumihars.

== Origins and Huseypur–Kalyanpur ==
The genealogy recorded in the 1867 Great Hathwa Case and later reproduced by G. N. Dutt in History of Hathwa Raj names Raja Bir Sen as the founder of the dynasty. It gives a succession of rulers preceding the later Baghochia rulers of Huseypur–Kalyanpur.

The genealogy traces the family's early history to Kosala and connects Raja Bir Sen with the traditional account of the Kosala king Virudhaka's conquest of the Shakya territory.

The early seats of the family were at Baghoch and Bharhichowra in the Gorakhpur region. The family later established its principal seats at Kalyanpur and Huseypur. Maharaja Kalyan Mall established a fort at Kalyanpur, and his successor Maharaja Khemkaran Sahi built a larger fort at Huseypur, about three miles away.

In 1539, Raja Jay Mal of Kalyanpur assisted the Mughal emperor Humayun after his defeat by Sher Shah Suri at the Battle of Chausa, providing food and fodder for the emperor's troops. Sher Shah subsequently moved against Raja Jay Mal for assisting Humayun, whereupon the Raja withdrew towards the forests of Gorakhpur and continued his resistance. After Humayun restored Mughal rule, Raja Jubraj Shahi, the grandson of Raja Jay Mal, appears in the historical record in connection with four parganas associated with Kalyanpur.

Raja Jubraj Shahi subsequently came into conflict with Kabul Mohammad of Barharia, an Afghan chief who had extended his possessions at the expense of Huseypur. Raja Jubraj Shahi defeated Kabul Mohammad, killed him, destroyed his fort and captured the pargana of Sipah. Akbar subsequently confirmed the parganas associated with Raja Jubraj Shahi that had been assigned to him under Humayun.

Huseypur–Kalyanpur came under Mughal authority in the latter half of the 16th century. Its rulers continued to hold their territories under Mughal suzerainty, while the ruling family retained its hereditary position at Huseypur.

During the eastern provinces revolt of 1580–1583, Abul Fazl records Raja Kalyan Mal as the Raja of Kalyanpur. When the Afghan rebel Masum Khan Farankhudi sought refuge at Kalyanpur after his defeat by the Mughal general Shahbaz Khan Kamboh, Raja Kalyan Mal declined to assist him. Farankhudi consequently returned to Ghazipur and submitted to the Mughal governor.

A later Baghochia family account states that Akbar entrusted Maharaja Kalyan Mal with 5,000 infantry and 100 cavalry to suppress a revolt in eastern Bihar. Maharaja Kalyan Mal succeeded in the campaign and was subsequently given responsibility for administering the territory brought under Mughal control.

Later accounts state that Maharaja Khemkaran Sahi maintained relations with the Mughal court. In 1625 he received the titles Maharaja Bahadur and Sahi and was granted the Mahi Maratib after assisting in the suppression of a revolt. The Mahi Maratib, or order of the Fish, was one of the great insignia conferred by the Mughal emperors upon princes of high rank. W. H. Sleeman later described it as one of three great insignia conferred upon independent princes of the first class. Maharaja Khemkaran Sahi subsequently moved the principal seat of the family from Kalyanpur to Huseypur and built a fort there.

In November 1632, the English traveller Peter Mundy recorded that the Raja of Kalyanpur visited the Mughal governor of Patna, Abdullah Khan, and presented him with an elephant, antelopes, hawks and other gifts. Mundy wrote that the Raja was initially received favourably and presented with a saropa, or robe of honour, but was subsequently detained and his property plundered. The Raja's wife and supporters then raised a disturbance. Ansari identifies the disturbance as a rebellion by the Rani and her supporters, following which Khwaja Anwar was dispatched to assist.

During the later Mughal period, Maharaja Sardar Sahi attacked Majauli Raj and destroyed its fort. According to Roper Lethbridge, he imposed terms requiring the Raja of Majauli and his descendants to refrain from displaying their nishans and dunkas before the Huseypur rulers.

Maharaja Fateh Bahadur Sahi of Huseypur resisted the East India Company after the Company acquired the Diwani of Bengal, Bihar and Orissa in 1765. He refused to accept the Company's revenue demands and continued armed resistance from strongholds in the Gorakhpur region and adjoining forest areas for several decades.

The Huseypur chieftaincy ended in the late 18th century. Its wealth and territory were divided among different branches of the family, including the branches that later held Hathwa and Tamkuhi. Other descendants and collateral branches also acquired estates in Bihar, eastern Uttar Pradesh and present-day Jharkhand.

== Names and titles ==
Dutt's genealogy records the names Sen, Simha and Mall among the earlier generations of the family. Later generations and branches are recorded with the names Shahi and Rai.

== Later branches and estates ==
After the end of Huseypur–Kalyanpur, different branches of the family held or acquired zamindaris and other landed estates in Bihar, eastern Uttar Pradesh and present-day Jharkhand. Hathwa and Tamkuhi became the principal successor estates, while other branches held estates including Ledo, Salemgarh, Sursand and Kiajori.

=== Hathwa Raj ===
A branch of the family established its seat at Hathwa after the end of Huseypur–Kalyanpur. The estate became known as Hathwa Raj. By the 19th century, Hathwa Raj was a large zamindari centred at Hathwa.

=== Tamkuhi Raj ===
Another branch of the family established Tamkuhi Raj in the Gorakhpur region after the division of the Huseypur territories. Tamkuhi formed a separate estate from Hathwa while retaining its descent from the Huseypur house.

=== Ledo Estate ===
A branch of the family acquired Ledo Estate in Pargana Kharagdiha. The estate was situated in the former Hazaribagh district and is now in Giridih district, Jharkhand.

=== Salemgarh Estate ===
Salemgarh Estate was held by a branch of the Baghochia family in the Gorakhpur region.

=== Sursand Estate ===
A branch of the family held Sursand Estate in present-day Bihar. Its territory extended as far as Chhapra.

=== Kiajori Estate ===
Kiajori Estate was situated in Chakai Pargana, historically part of Munger district and now within Jamui district, Bihar. It was held by a branch of the Baghochia family.

== See also ==
- Hathwa Raj
- Tamkuhi Raj
- Ledo Estate
- Fateh Bahadur Sahi
- Zamindars of Bihar
- Bhumihar
- Ghatwals and Mulraiyats
