= Bairisal =

17th-century king of Khukhragarh, India

- Raja
- Reign: c. 1599 -c.1614
- Predecessor: Madhu Karn Shah
- Successor: Durjan Shah
- Dynasty: Nagvanshi
- Religion: Hinduism

Bairisal was a Nagvanshi king in 17th century. According to Wester, he was king of Khukhragarh during reign of Akbar. However many historian not agree with him. According to them Bairisal was brother of Gajapati the Ujjainiya king of Jagdishpur.

According to Akbarnama, he visited Delhi and accompanied Emperor Akbar on many of his expeditions. The emperor pleased with his heroic deeds rewarded him with a dress of honour and other valuable gifts. The pargana of Sherghati was conferred on him. In 1613, after death of Akbar, he stopped paying tax to Mughal. According to Baharistan-i-Ghaibi, a campaign was launched against Bairisal because he failed to fulfil the payment of diamonds weighing 30 mithqals as peshkash (offer). The campaign was led by Zafar Khan and he was on the verge of achieving victory when the news of the death of Islam Khan, the governor of Bengal, force him to make a settlement. In 1614, he died and succeeded by Durjan Shah.
