= Raja Sangram Singh =

Sangram Singh
- Raja
- Reign: 16th century
- Successor: Todar Mal (Roz Afzun)
- Born: Haveli Kharagpur, Bihar
- Spouse: Chandra Jot
- Issue: Todar Mal (Roz Afzun)
- Dynasty: Kharagpur Raj
- Religion: Hinduism

Raja Sangram Singh was ruler of Kharagpur Raj in the 16th century. He was a contemporary of Akbar. Sangram Singh initially was allegiance to Akbar, but during the reign of Jahangir, he declared himself independence and was killed during battle with Mughal forces due to assassination. After his death, his son Toral Mal converting to Islam, changed his name to Roz Afzun, became loyal of Mughal and deployed as king of Kharagpur by Jahangir.

== Reign ==
=== Ally of Akbar ===
He allied with Akbar and helped in suppression of Afagan rebellion in Bihar. He clashed with the Muran Mal of Pural Mal of Gidhaur. Then he participated Mughal expedition led by Shahbaz Khan Kamboh against the Afghans in Bengal and Odisha.

=== Attack by Puran Mal and Shahbaz Khan Kamboh ===
Then Puran Mal with Shahbaz Kamboh attacked of Kharagpur. He had to flee the forest for shelter. He plotted to kill Shahbaz Khan Kamboh. A Rajput follower of Puran Mal allied with him, attempted to kill Shahbaz Khan Kamboh but killed another person in confusion. Then Shahbaz Khan Kamboh imprisoned Puran Mal in suspect. But later the assailant arrested and killed and Puran Mal released from Mughal imprisonment. Then Shahbaz Khan Kamboh transferred to Bengal from Bihar by Mughal. Due to this He again able gain seat of Kharagpur and became independent from Mughal.

=== Expedition against Afgan of Bengal and Odisha ===
Later Raja Man Singh was appointed as governor of Bihar, Bengal and Odisha. Man Singh forced him to become tributary of Mughal. In 1591, he participated in the Mughal expedition against Qutlugh Khan Lohani of Odisha with Man Singh and Puran Mal.

=== Rebellion against Jahangir and assassination ===
After death of Akbar, he attempted to become independent from Mughal rule. According to memoir of Jahangir, he collected around 4000 troops and large numbers of foot soldiers and challenge Mughal authority. Baz Bahadur, the governor of Bihar attack Kharagpur and in the battle, Sangram Singh got killed and rebel were defeated. After his death his son Todar Mal converted to Islam, became king and remain loyal to Mughal.

According to William Wilson Hunter, in his work Statistical Account of Bengal, When Jahangir came to know about rebellious activity at Kharagpur, ordered Sangram Singh to present himself in court of Delhi but order ignored. So Jahangir ordered Jahangir Quli Khan, the subedar of Bihar to suppress the rebellion. Baz Bahadur a commander was sent to Kharagpur. Raja Sangram Singh assembled his soldiers at Markan before a place near capital. The battle continued for several days. Then a foot soldier of Raja Sangram Singh went to the camp of Mughal forces and offered to assassinate the Raja Sangram Singh for a price. The offer was accepted by Mughal forces. The assassin succeeded in killing Sangram Singh. The army got confused after death of the king. They were fleeing from battle field but the wife of king, Rani Chandrajot, encouraged the soldiers to fight. She made her son Toral Mal the new king and continued the battle for several months. Baz Bahadur became desperate to end the battle made a compromise. He promised the queen to intervene on her behalf if she and her son agreed go to the court of Jahangir. The Queen accepted the proposal and went to Delhi with him. But when they reached Delhi, treacherously Toral Mal was imprisoned. But on the request of Baz Bahadur, he was released and presented before the Jahangir. Jahangir impressed with Toral Mal's manners and conversation advised to change his religion, to which he agreed. He was conferred with title of Roz Afzun and married to the daughter of a noble. The territory of Kharagpur was assigned to Islam Khan for a year and then to Afzal KKha, the governor of Bihar.

According to Tarikh-i-Kharagpurraj, the Baz Bahadur was unable to defeat the force of Sangram Singh. So he plotted to kill Sangram Singh in treacherous ways and killed the king with the help of his relatives.

Robert Montgomery Martin, collected local account, according to which Todar Mal was appointed as morchulburdar a person who fan the king with features of Peacock. In a hunting expedition, he killed a tiger with a single-handedly. Impressed by this emperor appointed him as a noble and converted him and his tree sons to Islam. He was given name of Roz Afzun and married to daughter of Baz Bahadur. But the lady considering the marriage as degrading refused to stay with him. The mother of Roz Afzun complained it to Emperor. Then Emperor married Roz Afzun to daughter of Murad Bakhsh and made him commander of 3,000 men and his sons that of 1000. Then Emperor Jahangir appointed Roz Afzun as king of Kharagpur. Roz Afzun returned to Kharagpur with his wife leaving his son Abdul Shah at Mughal court as a hostage to ensure his fidelity towards Mughal.
