= Madhu Karn Shah =

Nagvanshi king

- Raja
- Reign: c.1584 - 1599
- Predecessor: Sindhu Karn
- Successor: Bairisal
- Born: Khukhragarh
- Died: 1599; Khukhragarh
- Dynasty: Nagvanshi
- Religion: Hinduism

Madhu Karn Shah also known as Madhu Singh was a Nagvanshi king in the 16th century. His capital was at Khukhragarh.

He was known as Madhu Singh to Mughal. In 1585, during his reign Akbar's general Shahbaz Khan Kamboh invaded Khukhra. He was compelled to go to the Mughal court and secured his freedom by successful demonstration of his physical strength and submissiveness towards Mughal rule. In 1591, he participated in the Mughal expedition against Qutlugh Khan Lohani of Odisha. Sangram Singh of Kharagpur, Puran Mal of Gidhaur, Rupnarain Sisodiah and others joined Raja Man Singh. Yousuf Shah Chak, the ex-ruler of Kashmir, along with Madhu Singh and others, led a force into Odisha by way of Jharkhand. They defeated the Afghans, and some of the rebels like Nasib Khan and Jamal Khan, sons of Qatlu and Jalal Khan Khaskhel were captured and handed over to the Akbar.
