= Bhim Karna =

Nagvanshi king

- Raja
- Reign: c. 1098 - 1132 CE
- Predecessor: Gandharv Rai
- Successor: Jash Karna
- Dynasty: Nagvanshi
- Religion: Hinduism

Bhim Karna (c. 1098 - 1132 CE) was Nagvanshi king in 12th century. He succeeded Gandharv Rai. The change of title of Nagvanshi kings from Rai to Karna may be due to victory over or alliance with descendant of Lakshmikarna of Kalachuri dynasty.

According to Nag Vanshavali, Bhim Karna had to fight with Haihaiyavansi Raksel of Surguja. Raksel attacked Nagvanshi with 1200 cavalry. But Bhim Karna defeated the Raksel and captured territory up to Barwe and Palamu. He established his rule in Barwe and Tori which is now located in Latehar district. He took away idol of Basu Dev Rai from Raksel kings. The change of title from Rai to Karn may be due to his victory over or alliance with descendants of Lakshmikarna the king of Kalachuris of Tripuri. He shifted his capital which was earlier located at Chutia to Khukhragarh. He made a pond known as Bhim Sagar. In 2009, At Khukhragarh from excavation, archaeological department found the remains of the Nagvanshi dynasty's fort, an ancient Shiva temple complex, coins and pottery dating back to 12th century AD.
