= Medini Ray =

- Maharaja
- Reign: 1658 - 1674
- Predecessor: Bhupal Rai
- Successor: Pratap Rai
- Dynasty: Chero dynasty
- Religion: Hinduism

Medini Rai a.k.a. Madini Rai or Madini Rao ruled from 1658 to 1674 in the Palamu region of Bengal, now in Jharkhand.

== Reign ==
After consolidating his position, he started to expand his chieftaincy. He extended his sway over South Gaya and setup post in Kothi and Kunda in Chatra and Deogaon in Palamu. He invaded Navratangarh, defeated nagpuri raja Raghunath Shah and ransacked his capital. He also conquered Raja of smaller kingdoms including Belunja siris, Jupla, Kutumba and Sherghati in Gaya; Kunda Karnapura and Ramgarh in Hazaribagh; and a portion of Surguja who paid him tribute.

Upon accession of Aurangzeb to the Grant of Diwani jagirdars of Bihar, he placed contingents at the command of Daud Khan. Daud Khan started expedition against Palamu in 1660. He was accompanied by Mirza Khan, faujdar of Darbhanga, Tahawwur Khan, Jagirdar of Chainpur, Raja Bahroz of Munger. Orders were received from Emperor Aurangzeb that the Chero ruler had to embrace Islam. In battle, many Mughal and chero soldiers were killed. Medini Ray escaped to forest. Both the forts were occupied by the invaders and the region was brought under subjugation. The Mughals killed civilians of the forts and the temples with their idols were destroyed. Daud Khan constructed a Mosque after the victory in 1662. Medini Rai, the Chero ruler of Palamau, had fled to Surguja. However later he decisively defeated Daud Khan and reclaimed the kingdom which was later never recovered by Mughals. He made sincere efforts to promote agriculture and to better the desolate state of Palamu which had been caused by the repeated Mughal invasions. The region became very prosperous and the people had ample food and other amenities of life.

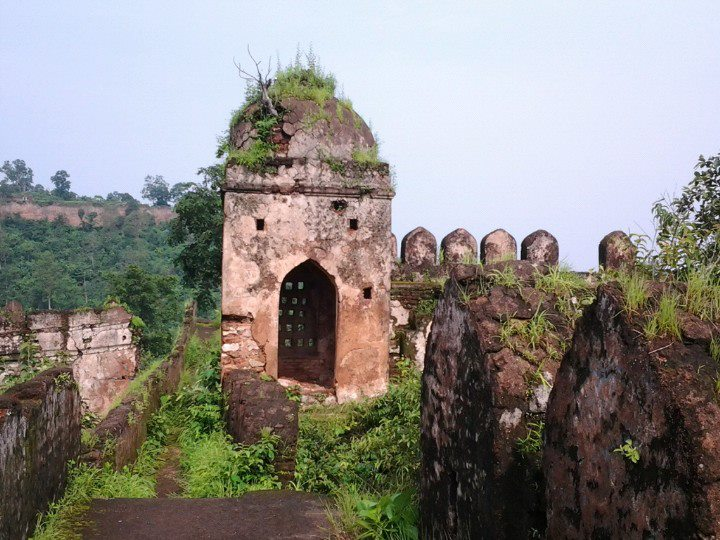
Palamu Forts

Maharaja had rebuilt the old Palamu fort which was earlier build by kings of Raksel dynasty. For defence he erected several turrets. In 1673, he had started constructing new fort on a hillock on the west of old fort. In the new fort, the gate is known as Nagpuri gate in which workmanship is in better quality. After victory over Nagpuri Raja, he built one of the Palamu Forts. He decided to build the gate in Nagpuria style. Beyond the Nagpuri gate, there is another small gate. On both outer side of the gate there is Persian and Sanskrit inscription of Barnmali Mishra the Pandit of Maharaja Medini Rai. According to inscription the construction work started in magh samwat 1680. He began building the fort for his heir Pratap Rai. After Maharaja Medini Rai's death in 1674, his son Pratap Rai took up the work of finishing the fort.
