= Fateh Bahadur Sahi =

Raja of Huseypur in India

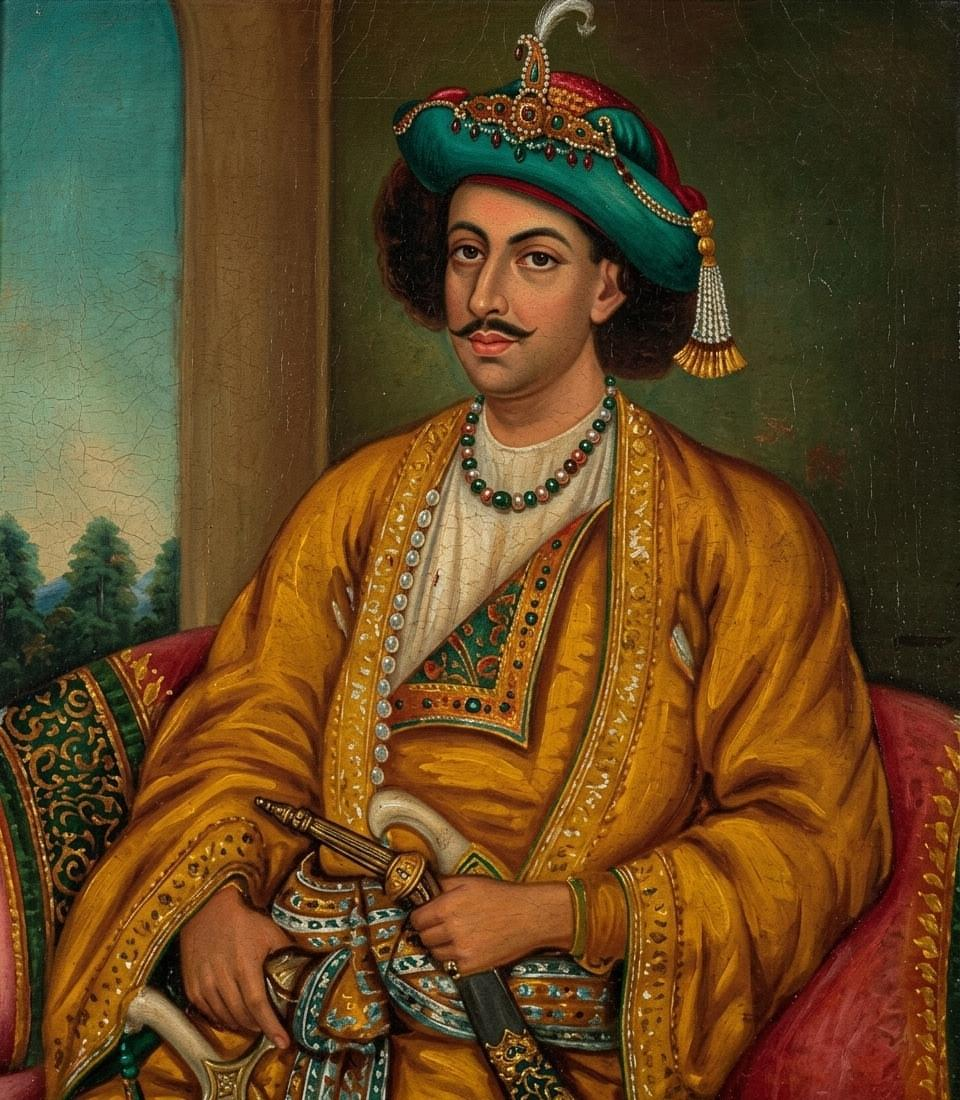
Maharaja Fateh Bahadur Shahi

Maharaja Fateh Bahadur Shahi was the 99th Maharaja of Baghochia Dynasty of Husseypur-Kalyanpur, centred around parts of present-day Bihar, and Eastern Uttar Pradesh, India. He is best known for leading a prolonged campaign of guerrilla warfare against the East India Company, resisting British expansion in the region for nearly three decades.

== Rebellion against the British ==
He collaborated with Mir Qasim, who continued to provide military support to him in his battles against the Mughal Emperor from Monghyr to Buxar in Bihar; he opposed the Dewani powers that the British had gained over Bengal, Bihar, and Orissa as a result of the Treaty of Allahabad in 1765.

Fateh Shahi along with Rajas of Bettiah and other regional rulers waged a guerrilla war against the British East India Company from 1767 onwards. The British reached a compromise with the Bettiah after which he continued on his own. He was swiftly deposed after this and fled into the forests with his followers where he waged a guerilla war against the Britishers. In 1772, he marched into Huseypur and killed Govind Ram who was appointed as the revenue farmer for the East India Company. In spite of this the company continued to try and bring Fateh Shahi into their fold as he held much influence among the regional rulers, however he refused all such offers.

By 1775, the British had been experiencing many problems in the region, so the British then designated Mir Jamal as their superintendent of the Huseypur revenue. The East India Company promised his cousin Babu Basant Sahi the throne if he would capture or kill him. Basant Sahi had been placed as the ruler of Huseypur by the EIC but Fateh Shahi once again marched into Huseypur at night with a thousand cavalrymen on May 3 in response to reports that the enemy was camped at Jadopur, close to Huseypur, and arrived at the enemy camp just before daybreak. After murdering his cousin Basant Sahi and Mir Jamal in the ensuing violent battle, he fled into woods. Even though two companies of sepoys were stationed in the neighborhood to keep an eye on him, this nonetheless transpired. After Basant Sahi's head was severed, it was given to his widow. The Widow together with 13 of his aides, whose husbands also perished in the fight, committed sati.

His repeated incursions had crippled revenue collection in the area and exposed the weakness of British control in the locality. In 1777, after many successes, he marched on to the Company's barrack / military station, gained control of it and placed his own men in charge. In response, the British destroyed his fort and they noted that he had caused even more problems for them than the Peshwas in Maharashtra. Following the rebellion of Chait Singh of Benares state in 1781 he renewed his campaign against the Britishers or in other words the East India Company. Raja Chait Singh of Banaras attempted to use the anti-British riots in Bihar during his insurrection in August 1781. He supported his relative Fateh Shahi in his mission to assassinate the British and their sepoys. Fateh Shahi had covert support from a number of regional rulers. They raised a force of 20,000 men at Munjoora in October, and they pillaged and took control of the Company's military outpost at Baragaon, which had been set there to repress Fateh. Fearing for his life, Saran Collector Grome turned to the anti-Fateh group inside the royal family, led by Dhujju Singh, a close friend and protector of Basant's younger son, for assistance. Together, they forced Fateh to flee into the jungle after engaging in a violent battle with him. His fort in Huseypur was destroyed. Warren Hastings at Banaras called for Dhujju as a reward, and he was adorned with a gold cloth khelat. But out of fear of a widespread uprising against them in the area, the British dared not punish a single one of Fateh's supporters.

The rebellion led by him along with others were eventually defeated and the Britishers reasserted their rule in Bihar after his forces were defeated in the battle.

== Legacy ==
Fateh Shahi's rebellion against the East India Company was the first of many rebellions against the Britishers in Bihar and India and the soon after that was followed by the 1857 rebellion. The saga of his struggle and fight against East India Company is described in the poem Meer Jamal Vadh.
