= Palamu fort =

Two forts in Daltonganj, Palamu, India

Coordinates: 23.8946°N 84.2328°E

Palamu Fort
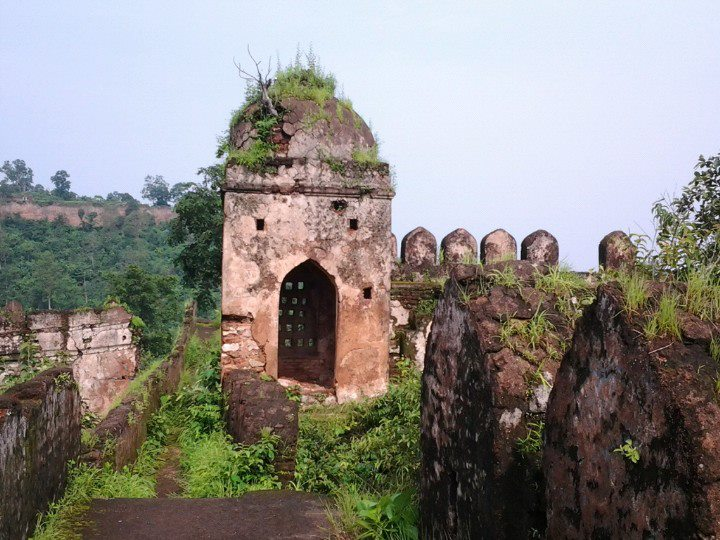
- Part of Palamu fort
- Interactive map of Palamu Fort
- Location: Betla National Park, Latehar district, Jharkhand, India

Site notes
- Architects: Raksel; Chero

The Palamu Fort are two ruined forts located 3 k.m from Betla National Park, Latehar district on the bank of Auranga River, in the Indian state of Jharkhand. The original fort in the plains and the other on an adjoining hill are attributed to the kings of the Chero dynasty. The fort in the plains had defences on three sides and three main gates. The New fort was constructed by Raja Medini Ray. East India company used this fort to prison Narayan Peshwa of Tiroha and Raja Harsh Dubey alias Subedar Aftab Singh, mutineers of 1857.

== Geography ==
The Palamu Kila are two ruined forts located southeast of the city of Medininagar in the Indian state of Jharkhand. These are large forts located deep in the forests of Palamu near Daltonganj The first fort (old fort) is in the plains and the second fort (new fort)is in an adjoining hill, and both overlook the meandering Auranga River (also known as Ornaga River) in Palamu. The river looks like jagged teeth due to extensive rock exposures in the bed of the river which may perhaps be the source of the name 'Palamau', meaning the "place of the fanged river." The forts are in a densely forested area of the Betla National Park. The forts are close to each other and lie about 20 kilometres (12 mi) from Daltonganj.

== History ==
The old fort in the plains, which existed even before the Chero dynasty, was built by the King of Raksel Dynasty. However, it was during the reign of King Medini Ray (also spelled Medini Rai), who ruled for thirteen years from 1658 to 1674 in Palamau. The old fort was rebuilt into a defensive structure. Ray was a Chero tribal king. His rule extended to areas in South Gaya and Hazaribagh. He attacked Doisa now known as Navratangarh (33 miles (53 km) from Ranchi) and defeated the Nagvanshi Raja Raghunath Shah. With war bounty he constructed the lower fort close to Satbarwa, and this fort became famous in the history of the district.

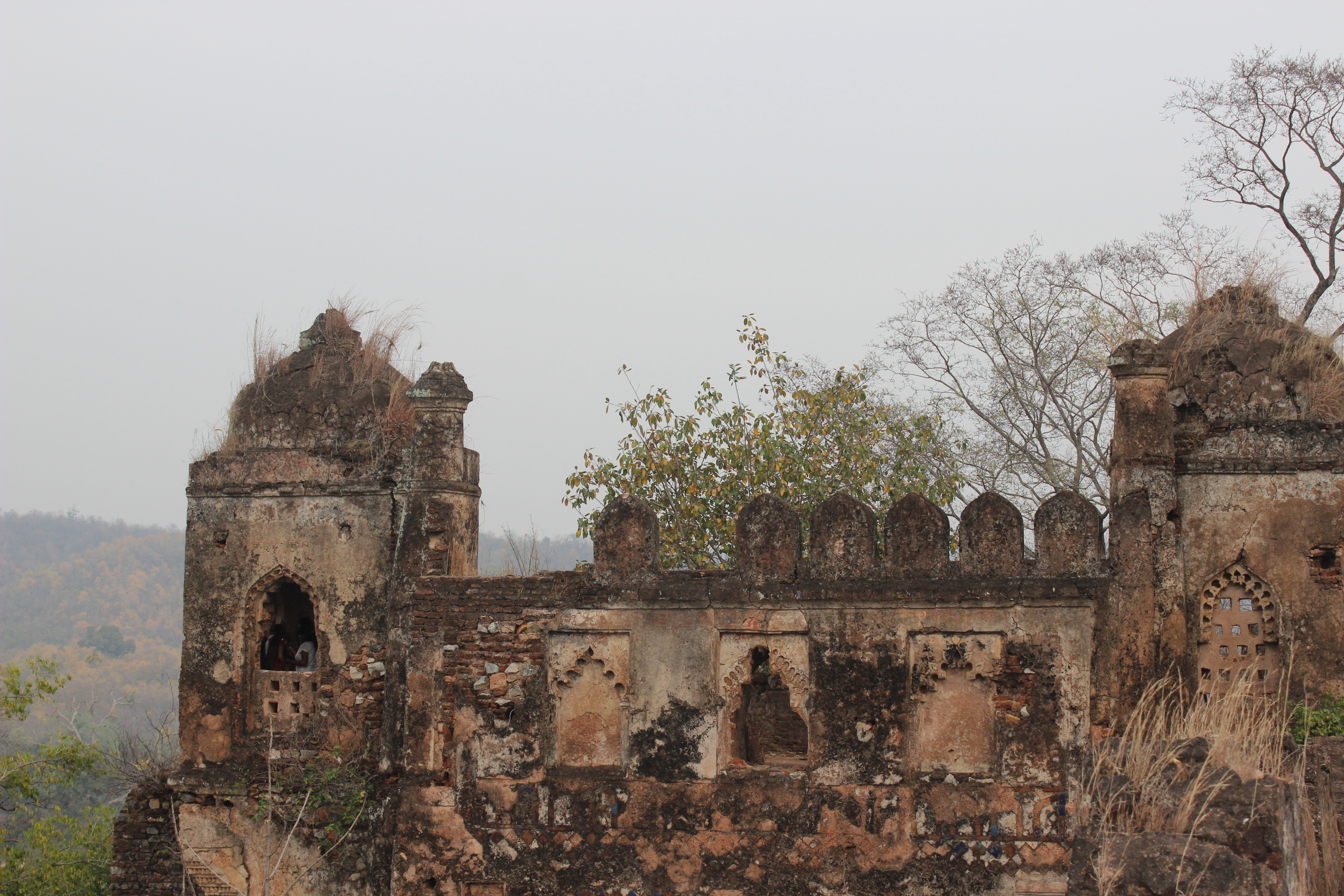
Palamu fort

The Mughals, during the reign of Emperor Akbar, under the command of Raja Man Singh, invaded in 1574, but subsequently his contingent at Palamau was defeated in 1605 following the death of Akbar. During the reign of Jahangir, the Subedar of Patna and Palamau tried to impose a tribute on the Raksel rulers which they refused to pay. This resulted in three attacks in series by the Mughals.

The rulers of Raksel Dynasty in 1613 CE were invaded by the Chero under Bhagwant Rai with the aid of chiefs, the ancestors of The Thakurais of Ranka, Namudag and Chainpur. When the Raksel Raja Man Singh then ruling Palamu was out of capital Bhagwant Rai seized power. On hearing this news Raja Man Singh made no efforts to regain his kingdom of Palamu, retreated into Surguja and established the Raksel of Surguja. Surguja State was one of the main princely states of Central India during the period of the British Raj.

Daud Khan, who launched his invasion starting from Patna on 3 April 1660, attacked south of Gaya district and finally arrived at the Palamu Forts on 9 December 1660. The terms of surrender and payment of tribute were not acceptable to the Cheros; Daud Khan wanted complete conversion of all Hindus under the Chero rule to Islam. Following this, Khan mounted a series of attacks on the forts. Cheros defended the forts but ultimately both forts were occupied by Daud Khan, and the Cheros fled to the jungles. Hindus were driven out, the temples were destroyed, and Islamic rule imposed.

Following the death of Medini Ray there was rivalry within the royal family of the Chero dynasty which ultimately led to its downfall; this was engineered by the ministers and advisers in the court. Chitrajeet Rai's nephew Gopal Rai betrayed him and facilitated the Patna Council of the British East India Company to attack the fort. When the new fort was attacked by Captain Camac on 28 January 1771, the Chero soldiers fought valiantly but had to retreat to the old fort on account of water shortage. This facilitated the British army to occupy the new fort located on a hill without any struggle. This location was strategic and enabled the British to mount canon supported attacks on the old fort. The Cheros fought valiantly with their own canons but the old fort was besieged by the British on 19 March 1771. The fort was finally occupied by the British in 1772. The Cheros and Kharwars again rebelled against the British in 1882 but the attack was repulsed.

== Features ==
=== Fort in the plains ===
The old fort was built over an area of 3 square kilometres (1.2 sq mi). It has three gates with rampart of 7 feet (2.1 m) width. The fort has been constructed with lime and surkhi mortar. The external boundary walls of the fort, all along its length, is built with "lime-surki sun-baked bricks", which are flat and long bricks. The central gate is the largest of three gates and is known as "Singh Dwar". The courtroom, located in the middle of the fort, is a two-storied edifice, which was used by the king to hold court. The fort had an aqueduct bringing water to meet the needs of people and animals within the fort but now seen in a ruined state. After entering from the second gate, the fort had three Hindu temples (attesting to the fact that Medini Ray was a religious Hindu king) which were partly modified into mosques when Daud Khan occupied the fort after defeating Medini Ray.

On the south-western part of the fort, which is surrounded by hills on three sides, there is a small stream called the Kamadah Jheel which was used by the women of the royal family for their daily ablutions. Between this stream and the fort there are two watch towers (dom kilas) located on the hilltop which were used to track any enemy intrusions. Of these two towers, one tower houses a small temple of a goddess called Devi Mandir.

=== Fort on the hill ===
The fort which is situated on a hill to the west of the old fort was constructed by Medini Ray in 1673, two years before his demise. This fort has an entrance gate known as Nagpuri gate. The gate has fine carvings which are said to be an adaptation of the Nagapuri style which Medini Ray copied after he defeated the Nagpuri king Raghunath Shah. The main gate to the fort follows the Nagpuri gate, is of smaller size and has stone pillars on both sides. There are inscriptions on these pillars written in Arabic/Persian and in Sanskrit attributed to Banmali Mishra, the guru of the king. The inscription states that the fort's construction was started in the month of Magh (mid January/mid February), in 1680 Samvat according to the Hindu calendar (56.7 years ahead of the Gregorian calendar). He started building this fort for his heir Pratap Rai. However, Pratap Rai made efforts to complete the fort at Betla but failed as he did not have the same vision as his father. The fort has remained incomplete.
