= Rudra Pratap Sarangi =

Indian politician

Rudra Pratap Sarangi (1928–2013) was a leader of Bharatiya Janata Party from Jharkhand. He was a member of Lok Sabha from Jamshedpur elected in 1977 and 1980. Sarangi was a member of Bihar Vidhan Sabha from 1962 to 1976. He served as minister of State for Agriculture, Cooperation and Irrigation, Government of Bihar in 1967 to 1968. He was associated with Bharatiya Mazdoor Sangh. He was prominent leader of Vanachal state movement which demanded statehood for forest region for south Bihar.
