= Chero chieftaincy =

Chieftaincy within the Mughal Empire (1572–1813)

- 1572–1813
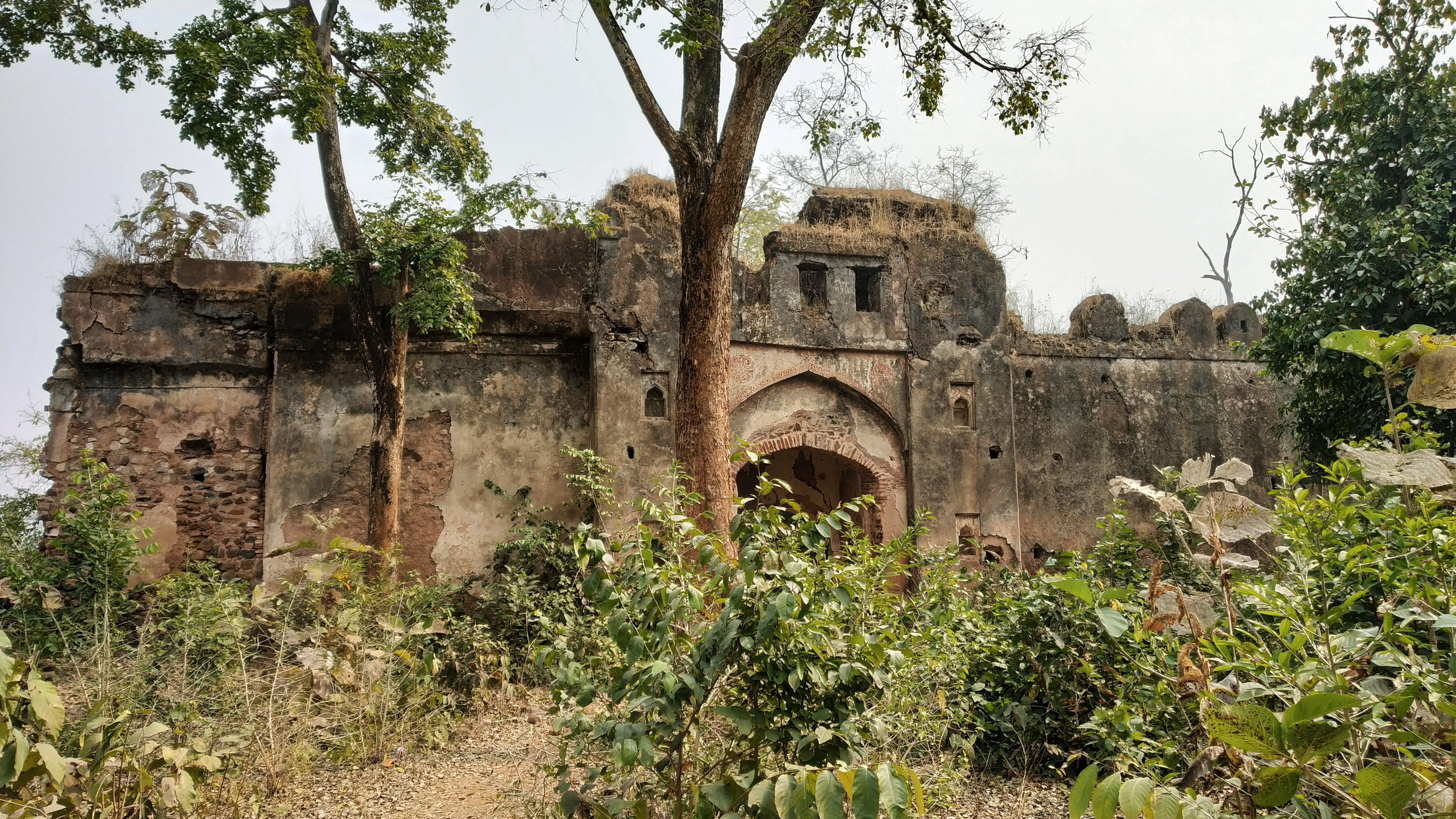
- The ruins of Palamu fort
- Capital: Palamu Forts
- Religion: Hinduism
- Government: Principality
- Raja
- History
  - Established: 1572
  - Disestablished: 1813
Preceded by	Succeeded by
Raksel dynasty	Company rule in India
- Today part of: India

Part of a series on the
History of Bihar
Ancient History
Prehistoric and Vedic Era

- Chirand (Neolithic) - Vedic period - Videha - Mithila (ancient) - Anga - Kikata

Urbanisation and Shramana

- Second Urbanisation - Rise of Shramana - Buddhism • Jainism • Ajivika

Gaṇasaṅghas

- Magadha - Vajjika League

  - Nāya
  - Vajji (tribe)
  - Licchavis of Vaishali

- Malla (tribe) - Kashi - Bulis

Imperial Magadha

- Brihadratha dynasty - Haryanka dynasty

  - Bimbisara
  - Ajatashatru

- Shishunaga dynasty - Nanda Empire

  - Mahapadma Nanda

- Maurya Empire

  - Chandragupta Maurya
  - Ashoka
Post-Mauryan and Smriti

- Shunga Empire

  - Pushyamitra Shunga

- Kanva dynasty - Development of Smriti - Brahmanical Revival

The Interregnum

- Kushan Influence - Mitra Dynasty - Resurgence of Licchavis

Classical and medieval
The Classical Age

- Gupta Empire

Early Medieval

- Later Gupta dynasty - Maukharis

Pala Era and Feudatories

- Pala Empire - Khayaravala dynasty - Pithipatis of Magadha

Medieval Mithila

- Karnats of Mithila - Oiniwar dynasty

Islamic Incursions

- Delhi Sultanate

Centers of Learning

- Nalanda - Vikramashila - Odantapuri - Telhara monastery

Early-modern
Afghan and Mughal Rule

- Sur Empire

  - Sher Shah Suri

- Mughal Empire

  - Bihar Subah
Regional Chieftaincies

- Chakwars - Chero dynasty - Gidhaur chieftaincy - Kharagpur Raj - Khokhra chieftaincy

Major Zamindari Estates

- Bettiah Raj - Khandavala dynasty - Dumraon Raj - Hathwa Raj - Jagdishpur estate

Colonial & Independence Era
Colonial Rule (1764–1947)

- Battle of Buxar (1764) - East India Company - Permanent Settlement (1793) - Santhal rebellion - Indian Rebellion of 1857

  - Kunwar Singh

- Bihar famine of 1873–74 - Bihar Province (Est. 1912) - 1934 Nepal–Bihar earthquake

Freedom Struggle

- Champaran Satyagraha (1917) - Salt Satyagraha - Bihar Vidyapeeth - Kisan Sabha

  - Swami Sahajanand Saraswati

- Quit India Movement

  - Azad Dasta
Modern Era (Post-1947)
Congress Era (1947–1967)

- Sri Krishna Sinha - Anugrah Narayan Sinha - Zamindari Abolition

Socialist and JP Era (1967–1989)

- Karpoori Thakur - Bihar Movement (1974) - Jayaprakash Narayan - Bhagalpur riots (1989)

RJD Era (1990–2005)

- Lalu Prasad Yadav - Rabri Devi - Fodder Scam

State Division (2000)

- Bihar Reorganisation Act, 2000 - Creation of Jharkhand

NDA Era (2005–Present)

- Nitish Kumar - Politics of Bihar

Culture, art, and society
Art and architecture

- Mahabodhi Temple - Nalanda - Barabar Caves - Tomb of Sher Shah Suri - Rohtas Fort - Golghar - Mithila Painting - Patna Qalam - Manjusha Art - Didarganj Yakshi

Society and language

- Bihari culture - Mithila • Magadh • Anga - Bihari languages

  - Maithili • Magahi
  - Bhojpuri • Angika
Religion

- Religion in Bihar - Buddhism in Bihar - Jainism in Bihar - Islam in Bihar - Sikhism in Bihar

Portal India Portal Bihar

The Chero chieftaincy was a principality located within the Mughal province of Bihar Subah.

Prior to the Mughal period, the Cheros held a collection of small principalities in the districts of Bhojpur, Saran, Champaran, Muzaffarpur as these fell, the most powerful emerged in Palamu.

== History ==
=== Origin ===
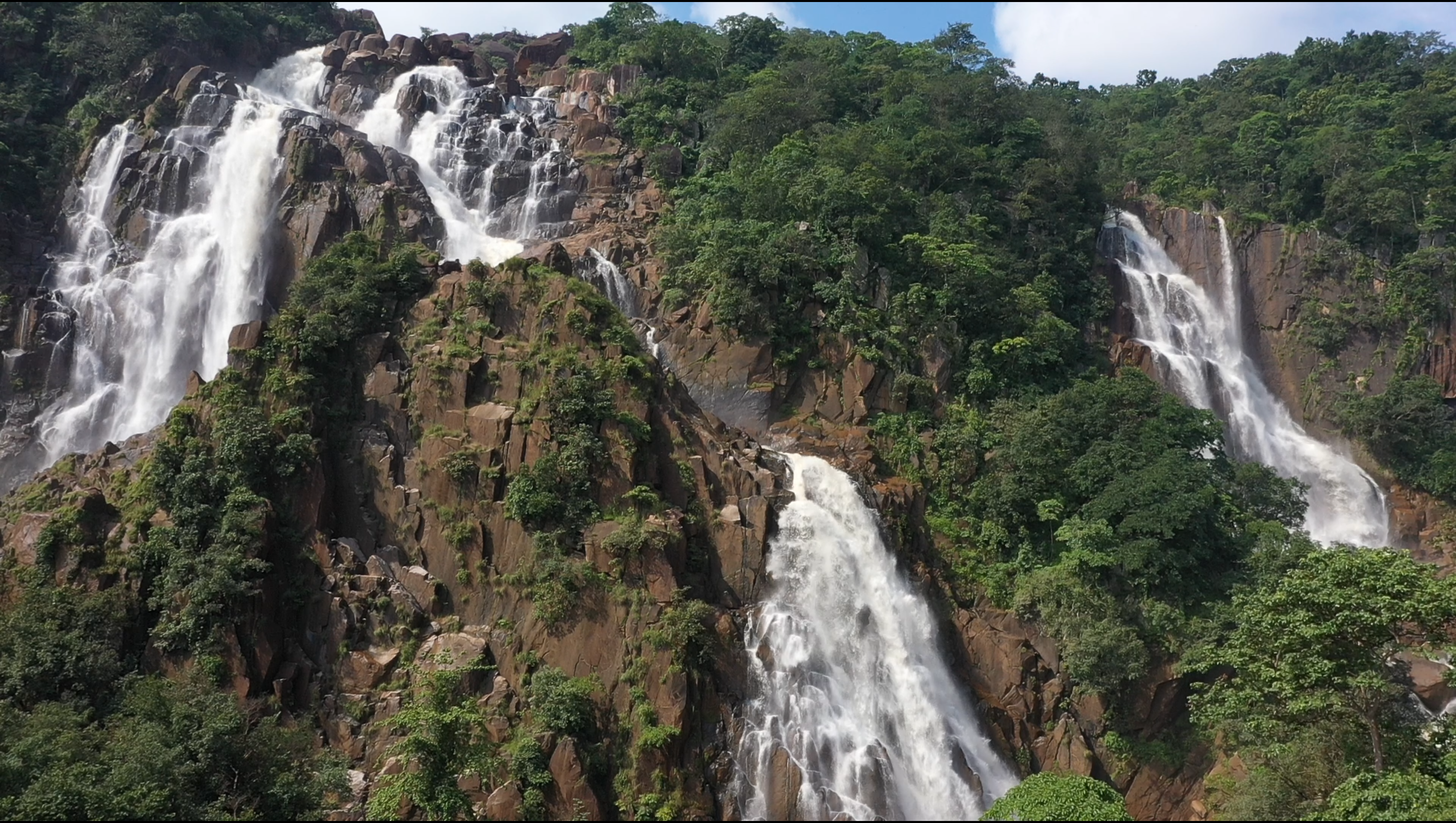
The landscape of the Palamu region

The Cheros emerged in the region after the fall of the Pala Empire when various small principalities began to appear in parts of Western and Southern Bihar in the 12th century. Some sources went as far as describing them as the "masters of the Gangetic plains" during this time. However their conflict with the Ujjainiyas led to them being expelled from many places until they formed their base in Palamu. The Cheros of Palamu claimed descent from Raja Salabahim of Chainpur.

The first Chero to establish power in Palamu was Bhagwant Rai who had originally worked under a chieftain called Man Singh of the Raksel dynasty. In 1572, with the assistance of allied Rajput chiefs including the Thakurais of Ranka, Bhagwant Rai drove out the Raksels into Surguja and killed Man Singh thereby establishing his power in Palamu.

=== Conflict with Afghans ===
The 16th-century historian, Abbas Sarwani, writes that due to the power amassed by Maharata Chero, Sher Shah Suri of the Sur Empire sent his commander, Khawas Khan, to subdue them. However, before he could, the Battle of Chausa began and the attack on the Cheros had to be delayed.

Ahmad Yadgar relates another incident where Sher Shah Suri wanted to take possession of a white elephant from Maharata. On his refusal, Sher Shah dispatched Khawas Khan with 4000 horsemen against the Raja. The Chero chief was besieged and compelled to surrender the elephant and Khawas Khan captured a huge booty.

=== Mughal period ===
The first Chero chieftain to find mention during the Mughal period is Anant Chero. In 1590, Man Singh after suppressing the chiefs of Kharagpur and Gidhaur, attempted to subjugate Anant Chero. Cheros offered strong resistance to the invading army but they were outnumbered. A large number of them were killed and many were taken as prisoners. Raja Man Singh captured valuable booty including fifty-four elephants. Palamu was thereafter brought under Mughal administration. Soon after the death of Akbar, Anant Chero drove out the imperial troops and declared his independence. In 1607, Jahangir ordered an expedition against Anant Chero. Mughal officials launched repeated attacks on Cheros and the Cheros had to shift their capital deep into the jungle.

The Cheros of Palamu began to grow in power again in the 17th century and under the leadership of Pratap Rai, they started to raid cattle from neighbouring Mughal districts. Because of this, Shah Jahan sent the Mughal Governor of Bihar, Shaista Khan, on an expedition to subdue the Cheros and stop the rebellion from taking place. During this expedition, the Mughals had trouble reaching the Chero stronghold in Palamu due to the hilly and forested terrain which made it almost inaccessible. Eventually, after 6 months the Mughals managed to surround the Palamu Forts and Pratap Rai surrendered which the Mughals accepted.

At the same time, in 1607, another branch of the Cheros fell under a leader called Kumkum Chand Jharap. This branch wished to retake the lands that the Cheros had lost to the Ujjainiyas a few centuries earlier in the northern parts of Bihar. Initially the Ujjainiyas could not offer much resistance because their chief Raja Narayan Mal who had usurped the throne after disposing Raja Mukut Mani in 1607, had gone to Mughal court in Delhi to pay homage to Emperor Jahangir. He brought these developments to the notice of emperor and also got assurance of imperial support against the Cheros. Immediately after his return, he raised his headquarters at Buxar, regrouped the Ujjainiyas and began his efforts to capture the lost territory. Kum Kum Chand Jharap upon realising he would not able to resist the onslaught of Narayan Mal alone for long, appealed to the Chero tribes of the Sonpari reign for assistance. At that time, Thakur Rai Kalyan Singh, the Bakshi of the Mughal imperial army who had been left at Buxar by Narayan Mal with half the army reached Bhojpur and joined the Ujjainiyas. Words spread in the Chero camp that the Mughal army had arrived to help the Ujjaniyas. This had the effect of demoralising the Cheros. After a long struggle between the two sides, the Ujjainiyas eventually emerged victorious in 1611.

The next notable Chero chief who finds mention is Medini Ray who came into power in 1620. He began a process of expanding the chieftaincies territory. He invaded the neighbouring Khokhra Chieftaincy, defeated its then chief, Durjan Shah, and then sacked the capital of Navratangarh. At its peak, the chieftaincy under Medini extended up to South Gaya and certain divisions of Hazaribagh. Other smaller chieftaincies were either outright conquered or made into vassals. Local folklore also portrays Medini Ray as a benevolent ruler who distributed land to the poor. He died in 1634 and was succeeded by his son, Raja Pratap Rai.

=== British-era ===
During the British period, the Cheros began to face a heavy economic burden from the revenue demands of the British East India Company. By 1814, the chieftaincy was bankrupt due to the lavish spending of Raja Churaman Rai, and the zamindari was confiscated on the grounds of bad management.

== Rulers ==
- Ghughulia
- Raja Ramchandar Rai
- Raja Sita Ram Rai
- Raja Salabahim
- Raja Phulchand
- Raja Maharata Rai
- Raja Kumkum Chand Rai
- Raja Sambhal Rai
- Raja Bhagwant Rai (1585–1605)
- Raja Anant Rai (1605–1612)
- Raja Shahbal Rai (1612–1627)
- Raja Pratap Rai
- Raja Bhupal Rai (1637–1657)
- Maharaja Medini Rai (1658–1674)
- Raja Rudra Rai (1674–1680)
- Raja Dikpal Rai (1680–1697)
- Raja Saheb Rai (1697–1716)
- Raja Ranjit Rai (1716–1722)
- Raja Devi Batesh Rai
- Raja Jai Kishan Rai (1722–1770)
- Raja Chitrajeet Rai (1771–1771)
- Raja Gopal Rai (1771–1776)
- Raja Gajraj Rai (1777–1780)
- Raja Basant Rai (1780–1783)
- Raja Churaman Rai (1783–1813)
