= Ghatwals and Mulraiyats =

Ruling chiefs in Jagir

Ghatwali was a feudal tenure/jagir for quasi-military services, they found in West Bengal, Jharkhand, and Bihar states of India. The ruling chiefs of these jagir were known as Ghatwals. They were responsible for maintaining safety, security, and law enforcement in their estate using a force of archers and Berkandazes.

== History ==
=== Birbhum Ghatwali Estates ===
The Deoghar subdivision consisted of 53 Ghatwalis among which the largest were Rohini, Pathrol, Baman-ganwa, Kukraha, Garsara, Teor and Burhe. The Deoghar ghatwali were formed under the Birbhum Raj in the 18th century to defend against the invasion of Marathas and neighbouring rulers.

=== Kharagpur Ghatwali Estates ===
Kharna estate was another prominent ghatwali in Kharagpur Raj.

=== Kharagdiha Ghatwali Estates ===
Kharagdiha estate was founded in 15th century when the then Maharaja was able to influence and impress the ghatwals of Kharagdiha Gadis. The Hazaribagh Gazetteer describes this kingdom 600 miles long which spread from Hazaribagh to Gaya. The Kharagdiha gadis were semi-independent chiefdoms. All that the ruler of the Gadi had to do on succession was to acknowledge the supremacy of the Kharagdiha Maharaja. The Kharagdiha gadis were earlier on ghatwali tenure, but when Captain Cammec found these Malik of the gadis prominent in their country, these gadis were settled with their Thakurs/ Tikaits slowly after 1793. The ghatwals of Kharagdiha given brevet rank became the Zamindars and Rulers of their respective estates. Koderma, Palganj, Ledo, Ghoranji, Serampour, and Srerampur were notable gadis.

During the British Raj, Kharagdiha became a part of Jungle Terry. The Gadis of Kharagdiha were permanently settled and they became Zamindari estates. The rulers of Kharagdiha were separately settled the zamindari estate of Raj Dhanwar in 1809. There were a total of 84 divisions of Kharagdiha called gadis, but 33 of these were transferred to other perganas. There were only 51 of these left which paid their rent through 36 toujis, and all of the gadidars/ ghatwals received mokarari Pattas from the Collector at different times. And in 1809 the remainder of Kharagdiha Pargana consisting of 54 villages was settled permanently with Girwar Narayan Deo on a revenue of Rs 5,226-12-10. This completed the settlement of Kharagdiha by creating 50 mukarrari gadis/ mahals and one permanently settled estate.

=== Bishnupur Ghatwali Estate ===
Rent-free lands given to the ghatwals by the Rajas of Bishnupur from time to time came to be known as Ghatwali lands.

After the 1810 revolt led by Baijnath Singh of Dampara, which prompted the deployment of military forces, the Ghatwali system in Jaibalea, Bishnupur, was dismantled by East India Company. In its place, new police stations were established across various estates, and the daroga police system was reinstated.

== Mulraiyati ==
Mulraiyati was another feudal tenure for revenue collection found in the district of Santhal Parganas. A Mulraiyat is a settlement holder whose rights are transferable and attachable. The tenure in its special form arose in 1877. It is peculiar to the Deoghar subdivision alone in the Santhal Parganas. The name "mul raiyat" was a term invented in 1877, during the Ashley Eden's government (later K.C.S.I). The mulraiyats have been used interchangeably with pradhans and mustajirs as they collected rent from ordinary raiyats as intermediaries, but the mulraiyats enjoyed superior rights and privileges on their estates.

Both Ghatwali and Mulraiyati estates historically passed from father to firstborn son (primogeniture). Along with Zamindars, these tenure holders formed the Aristocracy of Bihar. Ghatwali tenure was abolished in 1952 along with Zamindari.

== See also ==
- Zamindars of Bihar
- Zamindars
- Jagirdars
- Indian Feudalism
- Aristocracy
