= Vats (clan) =

Lineage of Brahmin in India

Vats, also known as Vatsa, is a gotra of Brahmins found in India. They are a member of the Bhrigu section of gotras.

== History ==
Historian Swati Datta (1989) analysed a number of ancient and medieval inscriptions that mention migrant Brahmins, including those belonging to the Vatsa gotra. Out of the fifteen Vatsas mentioned in these inscriptions, seven migrated to present-day Odisha, three each to Gujarat and Madhya Pradesh, and one each to Maharashtra and Bengal.
