= Kharagdiha =

- village
- Location in Jharkhand, India Kharagdiha (India)
- Coordinates: 24°25′24″N 86°09′57″E
- Country: India
- State: Jharkhand
- District: Giridih

Languages
  - Official (*For language details see Jamua (community development block)#Language and religion): Hindi, Urdu
- Time zone: UTC+5:30 (IST)
- Vehicle registration: JH
- Lok Sabha constituency: Kodarma
- Vidhan Sabha constituency: Jamua
- Website: giridih.nic.in

Kharagdiha is a village in the Jamua CD block in the Khori Mahua subdivision of the Giridih district in the Indian state of Jharkhand. It was known as Curruckdea or Curruckdeah during the British Raj.

== Geography ==
Cities, towns and locations in the Giridih district in North Chotanagpur Division
M: municipality, CT: census town, R: rural/ urban centre, H: historical/ religious/ tourist centre
Owing to space constraints in the small map, the actual locations in a larger map may vary slightly

=== Location ===
Kharagdiha is located at 24°25′24″N 86°09′57″E.

=== Area overview ===
Giridih district is a part of the Chota Nagpur Plateau, with rocky soil and extensive forests. Most of the rivers in the district flow from the west to east, except in the northern portion where the rivers flow north and northwest. The Pareshnath Hill rises to a height of 4,479 feet (1,365 m). The district has coal and mica mines. It is an overwhelmingly rural district with small pockets of urbanisation.

Note: The map alongside presents some of the notable locations in the district. All places marked in the map are linked in the larger full screen map.

== History ==
Kharagdiha estate was founded in 15th century when the then Maharaja was able to influence and impress the ghatwals of Kharagdiha Gadis. The Hazaribagh Gazetteer describes this kingdom 600 miles long which spread from Hazaribagh to Gaya. The Kharagdiha gadis were semi-independent chiefdoms. All that the ruler of the Gadi had to do on succession was to acknowledge the supremacy of the Kharagdiha Maharaja. Koderma, Palganj, Ledo, Ghoranji, Srerampur, and Sirsia were notable gadis.

During the British Raj, Kharagdiha became a part of Jungle Terry. The Gadis of Kharagdiha were permanently settled and they became Zamindari estates. The rulers of Kharagdiha were separately settled the zamindari estate of Raj Dhanwar in 1809. There was a total of 84 divisions of Kharagdiha called gadis, but 33 of these were transferred to other perganas, there were only 51 of these left who paid their rent through 36 toujis, and all of the gadidars/ ghatwals received mokarari Pattas from the Collector at different times. And in 1809, the remainder of Kharagdiha Perganan consisting of 54 villages was settled permanently with Girwar Narayan Deo on a revenue of Rs 5,226-12-10. This completed the settlement of Kharagdiha by creating 50 mukarrari gadis/ mahals and one permanently settled estate. Subsequently, the pargana contained, among its various classes of landholding, 20 Shamilat Taluks and 58 further Mukarrari Taluks created under written engagements, as recorded by 1877.

Subsequent to the Kol uprising in 1831 that, did not seriously affect Hazaribag, however, the administrative structure of the territory was changed. The parganas of Ramgarh, Kharagdiha, Kendi and Kunda became parts of the South-West Frontier Agency and were formed into a division named Hazaribag as the administrative headquarters.

In 1854, the designation of South-West Frontier Agency was changed to Chota Nagpur Division and it began to be administered as a Non-regulation province under the Lieutenant Governor of the then Bihar. In 1855-56 there was the great uprising of the Santhals against the British but was brutally suppressed.

== Places of interest ==
The Langta Baba Samadhi Sthal is located in Kharagdiha, about 30 km northwest of the town on the road towards Jamua. Langta Baba is revered by both Hindus and Muslims alike. People offer chaadars (shawls and blankets) to his samadhi as a ritual, and it is believed that the wish made here by a true devotee always gets fulfilled.
