= Khukhragarh =

- Khukhra
- Location within Jharkhand Location within India
- 23.332667°N 84.924685°E
- Type: Settlement
- Periods: Medieval India
- Associated with: Nagvanshi
- Location: Jharkhand, India

History
- Built: 12th century
- Built by: Bhim Karn
- Abandoned: 17th century

Site notes
- Excavation dates: 2007-2009

Khukhragarh was one of the capitals of Nagvanshi dynasty, who once ruled in parts of the Indian state of Jharkhand. It is located in the Bero block in the Ranchi Sadar subdivision of Ranchi district.

== Geography ==
Cities, towns and locations in Ranchi district in South Chotanagpur Division
M: municipality, CT: census town, R: rural/ urban centre, N: neighbourhood, T: tourist centre, D: dam, H: historical/ religious subdivision
Owing to space constraints in the small map, the actual locations in a larger map may vary slightly

== History ==
Nagvanshi ruler Bhim Karn shifted his capital to Khukhragarh in the 12th century after defeating Raksel of Surguja. In 1585, during the reign of Madhu Singh, the Mughals invaded under Akbar's general Shahbaz Khan Kamboh. It is said that king Durjan Shah shifted his capital from Khukhragarh to Navratangarh.

== Archaeology ==
In 2009, the archaeological department has excavated the remains of the Nagvanshi dynasty's fort dating back to 12th century AD. Archaeologists have found an ancient temple complex, coins and pottery.
