= Ledo, Jharkhand =

Ledo
- Village
- Location in Jharkhand, India Ledo (India)
- Coordinates: 24°13′40.5768″N 86°29′54.0666″E
- Country: India
- State: Jharkhand
- District: Giridih

Languages
  - Official: Hindi, Santhali, English
- Time zone: UTC+5:30 (IST)
- Vehicle registration: JH

Ledo is a village located in Giridih district in the Indian state of Jharkhand.

== History ==
Ledo also historically known as Bhandar Leda was the part of Pargana Kharagdiha and the seat of the Zamindars of Mahal Ledo. The Zamindars of the estate belongs to Baghochia Clan and are a cadet branch of Hussepur-Kalyanpur Chieftaincy. The title used by the rulers of the estate was Thakur, while Rai was used as a patronymic.
