= Shahbaz Khan Kamboh =

Commander in the Mughal Empire

- شاهباز خان کمبوه
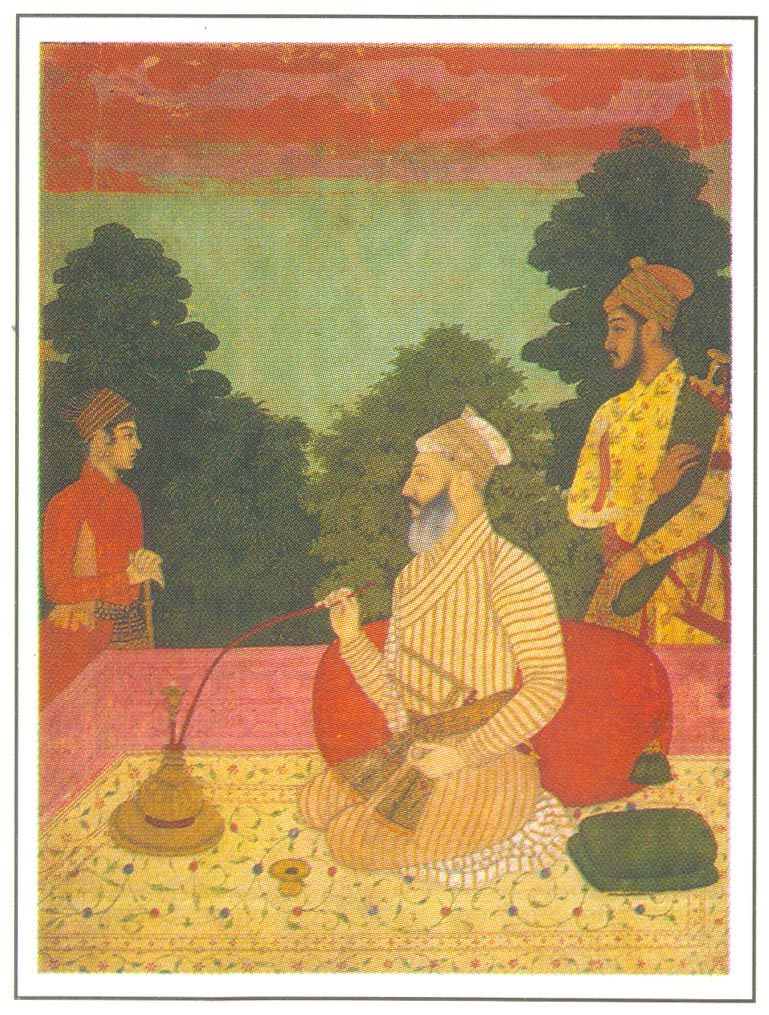
- An early-18th century Mughal painting of Shahbaz Khan, seated on a terrace and smoking a huqqa with a globular bowl apparently made of gold.

5th Subahdar of Bengal
- In office 18 May 1583 – 1585
- Monarch: Akbar
- Preceded by: Azam Khan I
- Succeeded by: Sadiq Khan
- In office November 1586 – 1588
- Preceded by: Sadiq Khan
- Succeeded by: Sa'id Khan

Personal details
- Born: Shahrullah Kamboh Ibn Jumla; 1529
- Died: 11 November 1599 (aged 69–70) Ajmer, Mughal Empire
- Children: Ilham Ullah

Shahrullah Kamboh (Persian: شهرالله کمبوه; 1529 – 11 November 1599), better known as Shahbaz Khan Kamboh (Persian: شاهباز خان کمبوه), was the mir bakhshi and the subahdar of Bengal during the reign of Mughal emperor Akbar.

Shahbaz Khan was known to the people of Lahore as Mang Khan (Punjabi: مَنگ خاں) due to his generosity. The city of Lahore was divided into nine guzars (zones) by Akbar, who named the first guzar, which came to encompass the Lahore Fort, Badshahi Mosque, and the surrounding areas between Taxali, Masti and Kashmiri gates of the Walled City, as 'Guzar Shahbaz Khan' after him.

== Early life ==
Born as Shahrullah in Lahore in around 1529, he belonged to the Punjabi Kamboh clan and was the sixth-generation descendant of Haji Ismail Kamboh, a disciple of Bahauddin Zakariya.

== Career ==
Shahbaz Khan entered Mughal service during the times of Akbar. The emperor soon elevated him to the rank of mir tozak (quarter-master general) and later to an amir (minister).

In 1572, general Lashkar Khan entered the royal court in a drunken state and challenged anybody to come and fight with him; his rowdy behavior led to his arrest, being tied to the tail of a horse and dragged before finally thrown into prison. He was replaced with Shahbaz Khan whom the emperor made his mir bakhshi (paymaster-general). The title of Shahbaz Khan was also conferred on him.

As soon as Shahbaz Khan became mir bakshi, he introduced the dagh-o-mahali, a new branding system. Under the old system, the country was divided into numerous fiefs which were distributed among the amirs; a major part of the revenue was misappropriated by the fief-holders for personal use. Shahbaz Khan changed the system to reduce corruption and the needless financial burden on the imperial treasury. However, dagh-o-mahali system made Shahbaz Khan the enemy of nobles such as Mirza Aziz Koka.

=== Military campaigns ===
Shahbaz Khan led multiple invasions that resulted in the subjugation of key areas in Mewar, such as Kumbhalgarh, Mandalgarh, Gogunda, and central Mewar, bringing them permanently under Mughal rule.

In 1581, when emperor Akbar marched against Mirza Hakim to Punjab, Shahbaz Khan came to Fatehpur Sikri and, for about ten months, he oversaw the state administration in the absence of the Emperor.

On 18 May 1583, Shahbaz Khan was appointed subahdar of Bengal and took the title Mir Jumla. By that point in time, he commanded 9,000-strong cavalry, comprised mostly of the Kamboj (Kamboh) horsemen and included both Muslim and Hindu Kamboj soldiers.

Shahbaz Khan had nearly driven Rana Pratap from the country when he was summoned by the emperor to support the forces in Bengal against Arab Bahadur. When Shahbaz Khan came near to Hajipur where Arab Bahadur had taken refuge with Raja Gajpati Ujjainia, he marched to attack him. For one month he carried operations against him, clearing away the jungle and finally drove off Arab Bahadur and made Raja Gajpati surrender.

In 1584, Shahbaz Khan crossed the Ganges near Khizirpur and seized Sonargaon. His forces ravaged Bakatpur where Isa Khan was trenched. He finally faced a defeat during the battle of Egarosindur and Bhawal and was forced to retreat to the Mughal capital at Tanda. In 1585, Shahbaz Khan subdued raja of Kukrah or Coira Orissa, a tributary to the Mughals. According to Ai’n-i-Akbari, Kukrah or Coira Orissa was a part of Bihar Subah.

=== Reappointed in Bengal ===
With reinforcements sent by Akbar, Shahbaz Khan again marched towards Bhati in 1586. In November 1586, Shahbaz Khan was again appointed governor of Bengal, which he served for two years before leaving in 1588.

In 1589, Shabaz Khan led an expedition from Attock against the Yousafzai tribe and defeated them. Shahbaz Khan also subdued Raja Ram Chander Sain, Rai Surjan Handa and Dauda, Farhat Khan, Raja Gajpati, Raja Sri Ram, Rana Sangram as well as the officers of Surat. He reduced Jagdenpur, Ara, Shergarh, and Rahitas.

=== Imprisonment and appointment to Ajmer ===
Shahbaz Khan had been kept in confinement for three years before he paid a fine of seven lacs of rupees. He was set free in 1599 and appointed as the deputy to the prince Jahangir in the administration of the province of Ajmer (Malwa). He was the general administrator of Malwa, which he held office till his death.

== Personal life ==
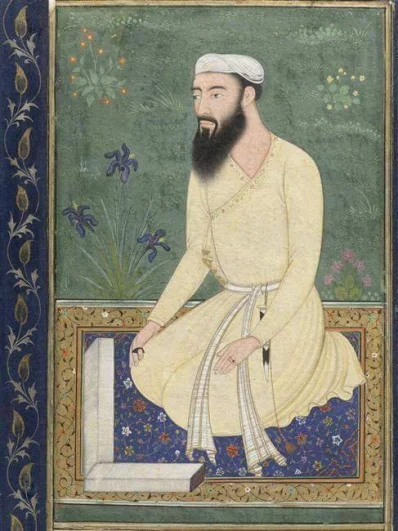
Miniature painting of Shahbaz Khan Kamboh

Shahbaz Khan died of illness on 11 November 1599 at Ajmer at the age of over 70 years.

Historian Abul Fazl, the author of Ain-i-Akbari, attests that Shahbaz Khan was a competent and capable general but he also accuses him for his bigoted Sunni views and arrogance. Many a times, he strongly opposed the emperor, but Akbar had a great regard for Shahbaz Khan and took it lightly. Shahbaz Khan was also known for his generosity and liberality and the money he spent was so great that it made the people think that he had in his possession Philosopher's stone. He left behind a huge Jagir, treasures and other wealth. which was seized by Jahangir, son of emperor Akbar after his death.

He was an all-rounder officer, and besides his military duties, he also helped Akbar with civil administration and financial matters. He became a very close confidant, a companion, a mir bakhshi (head of the military department, holding the rank of imperial minister) and a vakil (chief administrator or prime minister) of Akbar and had acquired and exercised great powers. He was given the name Shahbaz Khan at this point. He participated in some of the most difficult expeditions of Akbar and annexed numerous territories to the empire. The Mughal officials boasted that he conquered countries ten times the size of Deccan. He was too orthodox a Sunni Muslim for Akbar's taste, but not only was he tolerated but also was greatly valued.

=== Religious views ===
Shabaz Khan belonged the family whose ancestors were all celebrated for piety, asceticism and religiosity. Shahbaz Khan in early part of his life was celebrated for his religiosity till he first became deputy Kotwal of the Chabutara when he displayed his awareness of the (affairs of the) kingdom and judicious disposal of matters. He was a capable officer and brave fighter and had rendered meritorious service to the state in various capacities. A leading courtier of Akbar, he was strict follower of the law of Shari’ah and profusely recited blessings on Muhammad and distributed large sum of money in charities. Every Friday, he would donate one hundred Asharfis (gold coins) in memory of Abdul-Qadir Gilani.

Shahbaz Khan himself was a religious and pious man. He did not put on dress outside the sanction of simna (i.e. which had no sanction of Muhammad's action). He carried a rosary in his hand, reciting all the while invocations of God's salutations on Muhammad and between the evening and sunset prayers, he would sit down facing west (qibla) and offering nimaz. He did not follow other Khans as long as he was alive in shaving off his beard and drinking wine and did not have (the word) Murid on his signet. He remained steadfast in the religion of Islam and left his name in the world of generosity and religiosity.

Emperor Akbar tried his best to bring General Shahbaz Khan and another General Qutb-ud-din Muhammad Khan Koka into his new faith known as Din-i-Ilahi but the move was strongly criticized by both of them. This, according to Abu al-Fazl had created obstacles in his promotion upwards. On the other hand, many incompetent and junior officers got promoted which they did never deserve.

== See also ==
- List of rulers of Bengal
- Kamboj
