= Raksel =

Clan of Rajputs in India

Raksel is a Rajput clan that claims descent from the Yaduvanshi lineage of the Chandravanshi dynasty.

Raja Man Singh was ruling Palamu prior to the rule of the Chero dynasty. A Chero chief of Shahabad, Bhagwant Rai, served under Man Singh of Palamu and assassinated Man Singh, taking advantage of the local Raja's absence at a ceremony at Surguja to raise the standard of revolt and founded his own kingdom around 1572.
