= Ambapani =

- Township
- Location in Jharkhand, India Ambapani (India)
- Coordinates: 22.62°N 84.52°E
- Country: India
- State: Jharkhand
- District: Simdega
- Elevation: 452 m (1,483 ft)

Population (2011)
  - Total: 1,321

Languages
  - Official: Hindi
- Time zone: UTC+5:30 (IST)
- PIN: 835226
- Telephone code: +91-06525-XXXXXX
- Vehicle registration: JH
- Sex Ratio: 904:1000 ♂/♀
- Website: simdega.nic.in

Ambapani is a small village/hamlet in Thethaitangar block, Simdega District, Jharkhand state, India. It comes under Ambapani panchayat. It is located 21 kilometres (13 mi) south of the district headquarters at Simdega, 9 kilometres (5.6 mi) from Thethaitanger and 150 kilometres (93 mi) from the state capital of Ranchi.

== Geography ==
Taraboga (9 km), Rajabasa (11 km), Ghutbahar (14 km), Tukupani (15 km), Meromdega (15 km) are the villages situated near Ambapani. It is surrounded by Bolba Block to its west, Bansjore Block to its east, Biramitrapur Block to its east and Simdega Block to its north.

Simdega, Biramitrapur, Rajagangapur and Raurkela are the nearby cities.
