= Simdega subdivision =

- Subdivision
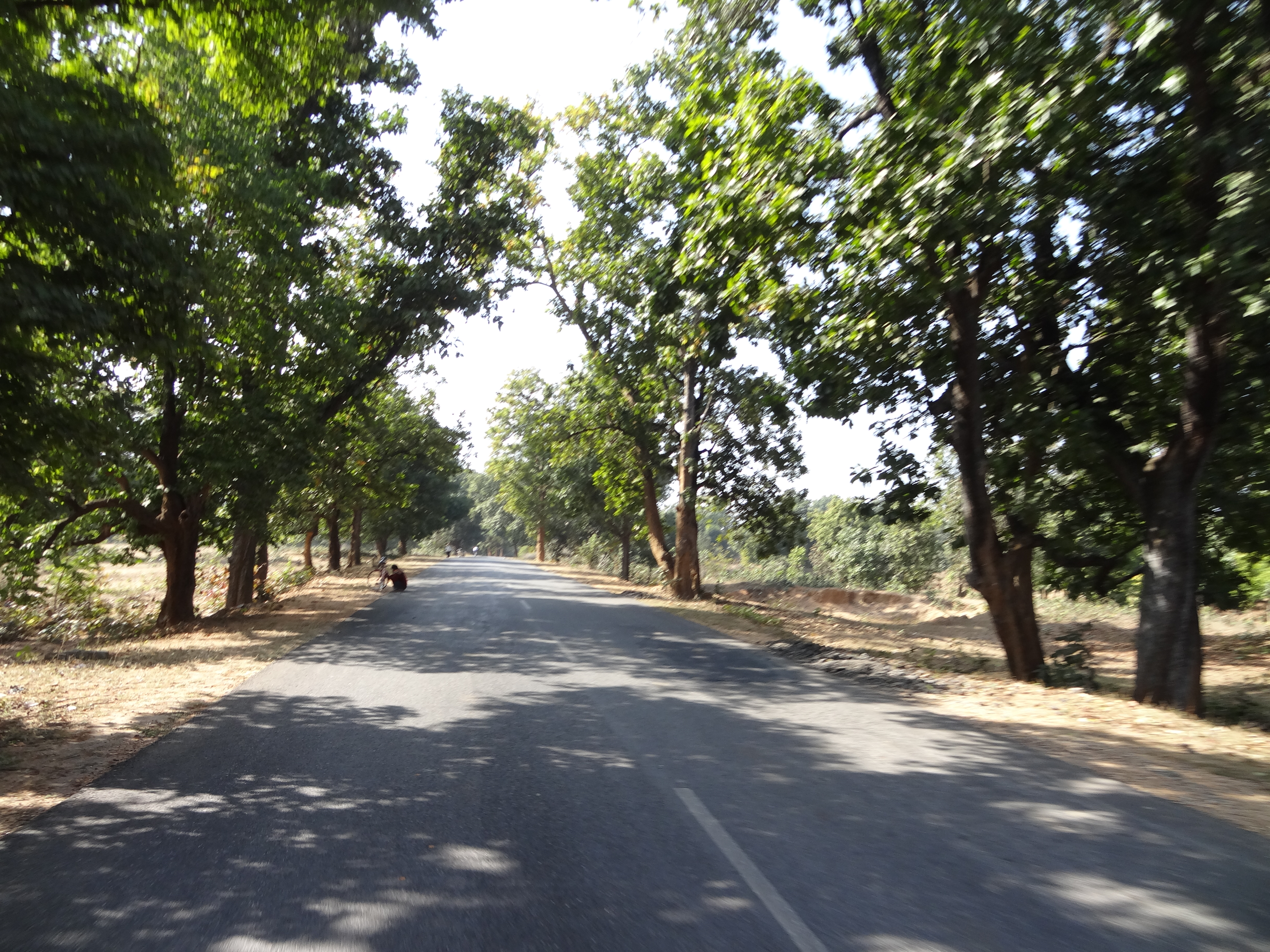
- National Highway 143 at Jampani in Thethaitangar block in Simdega subdivision

- Location in Jharkhand, India Simdega subdivision (India)
- Coordinates: 22.8012°N 85.9444°E
- Country: India
- State: Jharkhand
- District: Simdega
- Headquarters: Simdega

Area
  - Total: 3,774 km^{2} (1,457 sq mi)

Population
  - Total: 599,578
  - Density: 158.9/km^{2} (411.5/sq mi)

Languages
  - Official: Hindi, Odia
- Time zone: UTC+5:30 (IST)
- Website: simdega.nic.in

Simdega subdivision is an administrative subdivision of the Simdega district in the South Chotanagpur division in the state of Jharkhand, India.

== History ==
Simdega subdivision was established in 1915 and was one of the four subdivisions of Ranchi district. In 1983, it became a part of the Gumla district when the latter was formed and in 2001, it became a part of the Simdega district when the latter was formed.

== Overview ==
Simdega district has only one subdivision – Simdega subdivision. There are 10 blocks in Simedga subdivision – Bano, Bansjore, Bolba, Jaldega, Koldega, Kolebira, Kurdeg, Pakartanr, Simdega and Thethaitangar.

Simdega subdivision covers 3774.00 km^{2} and has a population of 599,578 in 2011. The subdivision has 450 villages (449 inhabited and 1 uninhabited), and 1 statutory town. Over 90% of the population lives in the rural areas.

== Geography ==
Cities, towns and locations in Simdega district in South Chotanagpur Division
M: municipality, R: rural/ urban centre, T: tourist centre
Owing to space constraints in the small map, the actual locations in a larger map may vary slightly

== Police stations ==
Police stations in Simdega subdivision are:

1. Simdega
2. Muffasil
3. SC/ST
4. Mahila
5. Thethaitangar
6. Kurdeg
7. Bolba
8. Kolebira
9. Bano
10. Jaldega
11. Kersai
12. Pakartanr
13. Rengarih
14. Mahabuang
15. AHTU

== Blocks ==
Community development blocks in the Simdega subdivision are:

CD Block	Headquarters	Area km^{2}	Population (2011)	SC %	ST %	Literacy rate %	CT
Simdega	Simdega	425.07	72,131	11.54	68.27	67.86	-
Bano	Bano	459.82	80,462	7.49	63.16	63.43	-
Bansjore	Bansjore	151.07	25,519	3.47	85.58	61.47	-
Bolba	Bolba	288.63	30,786	6.85	72.87	63.26	-
Jaldega	Jaldega	441.61	64,286	3.60	82.92	64.89	-
Kersai	Kersai	236.97	39,218	5.14	80.33	67.80	-
Kolebira	Kolebira	437.44	71,283	13.04	62.55	70.40	-
Kurdeg	Kurdeg	274.84	47,984	6.67	72.33	67.52	-
Pakartanr	Pakartanr	286.82	37,507	8.76	68.29	70.04	-
Thethaitangar	Thethaitangar	624.18	87,458	6.06	80.53	66.73	-

== Education ==
In 2011, in Simdega subdivision out of a total 449 inhabited villages in 10 CD blocks there were 117 villages with pre-primary schools, 417 villages with primary schools, 243 villages with middle schools, 65 villages with secondary schools, 13 villages with senior secondary schools, 1 village with general degree college, 2 villages with vocation training schools/ ITI, 6 villages with non-formal training centres, 26 villages with no educational facility.

The only nagar panchayat had 10 primary schools, 18 middle schools, 5 secondary schools, 5 senior secondary schools, 1 general degree college, 2 recognised shorthand, typewriting, and vocational training institutions and 1 non-formal education centre (Sarba Shiksha Abhiyan).
.*Senior secondary schools are also known as Inter colleges in Jharkhand.

=== Educational institutions ===
The following institutions are located in Simdega subdivision:

- Simdega College was established at Simdega in 1960.
- St. Xavier's College, Simdega was established at Simdega in 2016.
- S.K.Bage College was established in 1985 at Kolebira.

(Information about degree colleges with proper reference may be added here)

== Healthcare ==
In 2011, in Simdega subdivision, in the 10 CD blocks, there were 17 villages with primary health centres, 131 villages with primary health subcentres, 29 villages with maternity and child welfare centres, 18 villages with allopathic hospitals, 23 villages with dispensaries, 2 villages with a veterinary hospitals, 26 villages with family welfare centres, 101 villages with medicine shops.

The only nagar panchayat had 1 hospital, 1 nursing home, 2 dispensaries, 1 maternity and child welfare centre, 1 veterinary hospital, 7 medicine shops.
.*Private medical practitioners, alternative medicine etc. not included

=== Medical facilities ===
The major government medical facilities are: Referral Hospital at Thethaitangar and Community Health Centres (hospitals) at Bano, Bolba, Jaldega, Kolebira and Kurdeg.

(Anybody having referenced information about location of government/ private medical facilities may please add it here)
