= Jaldega =

- Village
- Location in Jharkhand, India Jaldega (India)
- Coordinates: 22.5768°N 84.8118°E
- Country: India
- State: Jharkhand
- District: Simdega

Government
  - Type: Federal democracy

Population (2011)
  - Total: 3,161

Languages *
  - Official: Hindi, Urdu
- Time zone: UTC+5:30 (IST)
- PIN: 835201
- Telephone/ STD code: 06525
- Vehicle registration: JH 20
- Literacy: 75.06%
- Lok Sabha constituency: Khunti
- Vidhan Sabha constituency: Kolebira
- Website: simdega.nic.in

Jaldega is a village in the Jaldega CD block in the Simdega subdivision of the Simdega district in the Indian state of Jharkhand.

== Geography ==
Cities, towns and locations in Simdega district in South Chotanagpur Division
M: municipality, R: rural/ urban centre, T: tourist centre
Owing to space constraints in the small map, the actual locations in a larger map may vary slightly

=== Location ===
Jaldega is located at 22.5768°N 84.8118°E

=== Area overview ===
In the area presented in the map alongside, "the landscape is formed of hills and undulating plateau" in the south-western part of the Chota Nagpur Plateau. About 32% of the district is covered with forests (mark the shaded portions in the map.) It is an overwhelmingly rural area with 92.83% of the population living in the rural areas. A major portion of the rural population depends on rain-fed agriculture (average annual rainfall: 1,100-1,200 mm) for a living.

Note: The map alongside presents some of the notable locations in the district. All places marked in the map are linked in the larger full screen map.

== Civic administration ==
There is a police station at Jaldega.

The headquarters of Jaldega CD block are located at Jaldega village.

== Demographics ==
According to the 2011 Census of India, Jaldega had a total population of 3,161, of which 1,496 (47%) were males and 1,665 (53%) were females. Population in the age range 0–6 years was 475. The total number of literate persons in Jaldenga was 2,016 (75.06% of the population over 6 years.

(*For language details see Jaldega block#Language and religion)

== Education ==
S.S. High School is a Hindi-medium coeducational institution established in 1964. It has facilities for teaching in class I to class XII. The school has a playground and a library with 234 books.

Kasturba Gandhi Balika Vidyalaya is a Hindi-medium institution established in 2007. It has facilities for teaching in class VI to class XII. The school has a playground and a library with 159 books and has 5 computers for teaching and learning purposes.

Project Girls High School Jaldega is a Hindi-medium girls only institute established in 1984. It has facilities for teaching in classes VI and X. It has a playground and a library with 250 books.

Model School Jaldega is an English-medium coeducational institute established in 2011. It has facilities for teaching from class VI to class X.

== Healthcare ==
There is a Community Health Centre (Hospital) at Jaldega.
