= Kolebira =

- Village
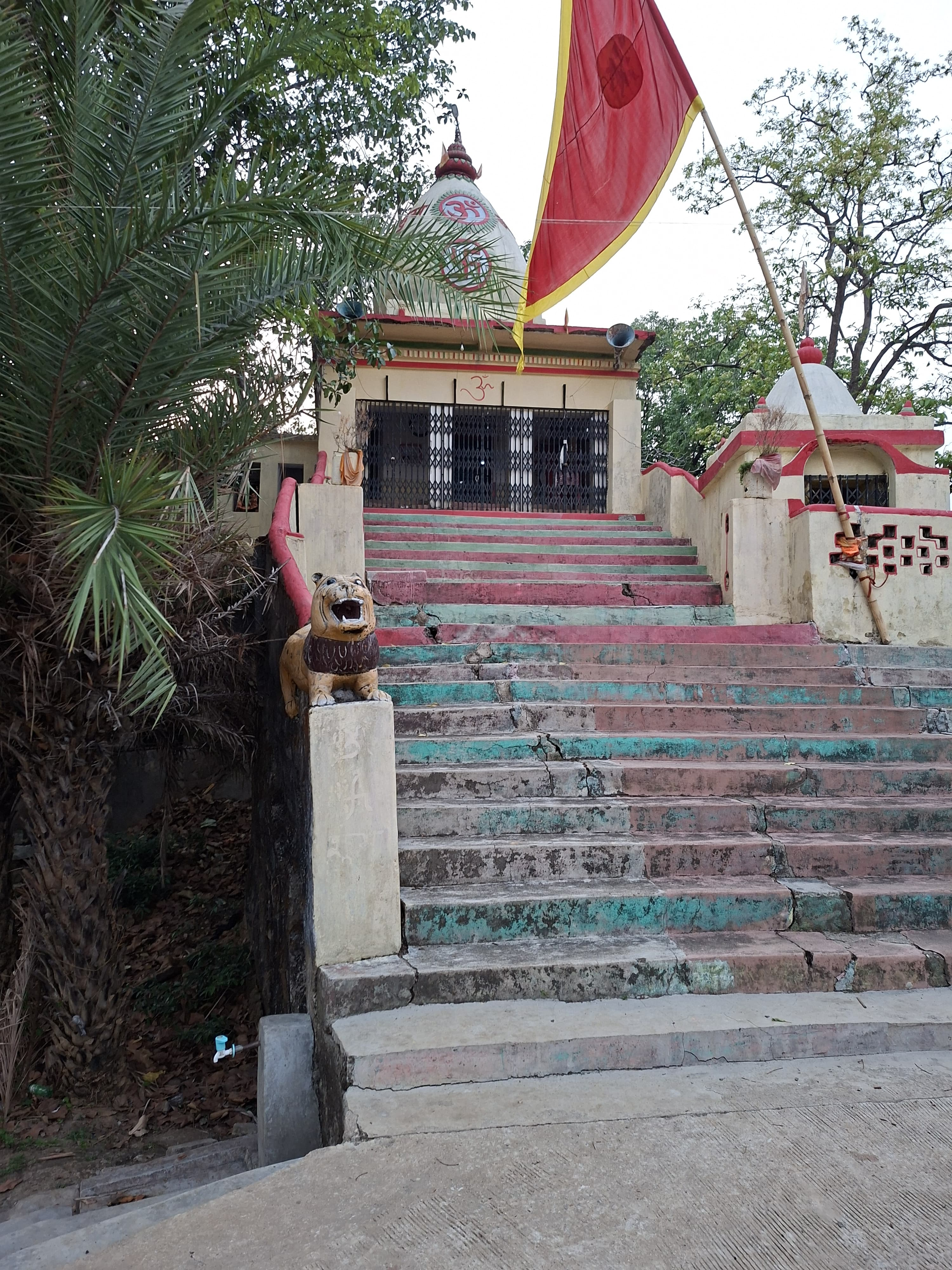
- Bhawar Pahar Temple in Kolebira

- Location in Jharkhand, India Kolebira (India)
- Coordinates: 22.7043°N 84.6929°E
- Country: India
- State: Jharkhand
- District: Simdega

Government
  - Type: Federal democracy

Population (2011)
  - Total: 4,423

Languages *
  - Official: Hindi, Urdu
- Time zone: UTC+5:30 (IST)
- PIN: 835226
- Telephone/ STD code: 06525
- Vehicle registration: JH 20
- Literacy: 71.33%
- Lok Sabha constituency: Khunti
- Vidhan Sabha constituency: Kolebira
- Website: simdega.nic.in

Kolebira is a village in the Kolebira CD block in the Simdega subdivision of the Simdega district in the Indian state of Jharkhand.

== Geography ==
Cities, towns and locations in Simdega district in South Chotanagpur Division
M: municipality, R: rural/ urban centre, T: tourist centre
Owing to space constraints in the small map, the actual locations in a larger map may vary slightly

=== Location ===
Kolebira is located at 22.7043°N 84.6929°E

=== Area overview ===
In the area presented in the map alongside, "the landscape is formed of hills and undulating plateau" in the south-western part of the Chota Nagpur Plateau. About 32% of the district is covered with forests (mark the shaded portions in the map.) It is an overwhelmingly rural area with 92.83% of the population living in the rural areas. A major portion of the rural population depends on rain-fed agriculture (average annual rainfall: 1,100-1,200 mm) for a living.

Note: The map alongside presents some of the notable locations in the district. All places marked in the map are linked in the larger full screen map.

== Civic administration ==
There is a police station at Kolebira.

The headquarters of Kolebira CD block are located at Kolebira village.

== Demographics ==
According to the 2011 Census of India, Kolebira had a total population of 4,659, of which 2,378 (51%) were males and 2,281 (49%) were females. Population in the age range 0–6 years was 686. The total number of literate persons in Kolebira was 3,332 (83.87% of the population over 6 years.

(*For language details see Kolebira block#Language and religion)

== Education ==
S.K.Bage College was established in 1985 at Kolebira. It offers degree courses in arts, science and commerce.

S.S. High School is a Hindi-medium coeducational institution established in 1961. It has facilities for teaching in class I to class X. The school has a playground and a library with 945 books.

Government High School Kolebira (Girls) is a Hindi-medium institution established in 1966. It has facilities for teaching in class VI to class X. The school has a library with 269 books and has 2 computers for teaching and learning purposes.

S.K.Bage Inter College Kolebira is a Hindi-medium coeducational institute established in 1972. It has facilities for teaching in classes XI and XII. It has a playground and a library with 3032 books.

Kasturba Gandhi Balika Vidyalaya is a Hindi-medium girls only institute established in 2007. It has facilities for teaching from class VI to class XII. The school has a library with 796 books and has 5 computers for teaching and learning purposes.

Children's Academy English Medium School is a coeducational institute established in 2015. It has facilities for teaching from class I to class XII. The school has a playground.

== Healthcare ==
There is a Community Health Centre (Hospital) at Kolebira.
