= Pakartanr block =

Pakartanr
- Community development block
- Location in Jharkhand Pakartanr (India)
- Coordinates: 22.71253°N 84.43248°E
- Country: India
- State: Jharkhand
- District: Simdega

Government
  - Type: Federal democracy

Area
  - Total: 286.82 km^{2} (110.74 sq mi)

Population (2011)
  - Total: 37,507
  - Density: 130.77/km^{2} (338.69/sq mi)

Languages
  - Official: Hindi, Urdu
- Time zone: UTC+5:30 (IST)
- PIN: 835228
- Telephone/STD code: 0625
- Vehicle registration: JH 20
- Literacy: 70.04%
- Lok Sabha constituency: Khunti
- Vidhan Sabha constituency: Simdega
- Website: simdega.nic.in

Pakartar block (also spelled Pakardanr) is a CD block that forms an administrative division in the Simdega subdivision of Simdega district, in the Indian state of Jharkhand.

== History ==
Gumla district was carved out of Ranchi district in 1983. Till 30 April 2001, Simdega was a subdivision of Gumla district and was made a separate district from that date.

== Maoist activities ==
According to a PIB release in 2018, Simdega is one of the thirty districts most affected by Left wing extremism in the country (along with twelve other districts of Jharkhand). “The terrain of the district is very tough and geography is favourable for naxal activities.” All police stations in the district are well fortified and equipped to handle the situation. Community policing activities are being prioritised to involve the simple village folk.

Hemant Soren, Chief Minister of Jharkhand, has claimed, in September 2021, that as a result of the effective action against left wing extremism, the “presence of hardcore Maoists has been limited to mainly four regions, namely Parasnath Pahar, Budha Pahar, Tri-junction of Seraikela-Khunti-Chaibasa district in Kolhan division and some of the areas along the Bihar border”.

== Geography ==
Simdega district lies in the south-western part of the Chota Nagpur Plateau. It has been described as “a dissected upland of ancient crystalline rocks” The general elevation of the district is 300 to 700 metres (980 to 2,300 ft) above mean sea level. The landscape is formed of hills and undulating plateau. The Major rivers of this area are Sankh, Deo, Girwa, and Palamara.

Pakartanr CD block has an area of 286.82 km^{2}.Pakartanr police station serves Pakartanr CD block. The headquarters of Pakartanr CD block is located at Pakartanr village.

Pakartanr CD block is bounded by Palkot block in Gumla district on the north, Simdega CD block on the east and south, and Raidih CD block in Gumla district on the west.

== Demographics ==
=== Population ===
According to the 2011 Census of India, Pakartanr CD block had a total population of 37,507, all of which were rural. There were 19,065 (51%) males and 18,442 (49%) females. Population in the age range 0–6 years was 5,845. Scheduled Castes numbered 3,287 (8.76%) and Scheduled Tribes numbered 25,613 (68.29%).

=== Literacy ===
According to the 2011 census, the total number of literate persons in Pakartanr CD block was 22,176 (70.04% of the population over 6 years) out of which males numbered 12,601 (78.76% of the male population over 6 years) and females numbered 9,575 (61.14% of the female population over 6 years). The gender disparity (the difference between female and male literacy rates) was 17.62%.

As of 2011 census, literacy in Simdega district was 67.59%. Literacy in Jharkhand was 67.63% in 2011. Literacy in India in 2011 was 74.04%.

See also – List of Jharkhand districts ranked by literacy rate

Literacy in CD Blocks of
Simdega district
Simdega Sadar subdivision
Simdega – 67.86%
Pakartanr – 70.04%
Kurdeg – 67.52%
Kersai – 67.80%
Bolba – 63.26%
Thethaitangar – 66.73%
Kolebira – 70.40%
Jaldega – 64.89
Bansjore – 61.47%
Bano – 63.43%
Source: 2011 Census: CD block Wise
Primary Census Abstract Data

=== Language and religion ===
Languages of Pakartanr block (2011)
1. Sadri (73.2%)
2. Kharia (23.2%)
3. Mundari (1.14%)
4. Others (2.52%)

According to the Population by Mother Tongue 2011 data, in the Pakartanr subdistrict, Hindi was the mother-tongue of 27,765 persons forming 75.37% of the population, followed by (number of persons and percentage of population in brackets) Kharia (8,539/23.18%), Mundari (420/ 1.14%), and persons with other languages as mother-tongue (323/ 0.87%). ‘Other languages’ included 208 persons having Kurukh/Oraon, as mother-tongue.Persons having Hindi as mother-tongue included 26,481 persons having Sadri/ Sadan as mother-tongue and 958 persons having Nagpuri as mother-tongue.

Note: An attempt has been made to include all language groups each with at least 300 persons as their mother-tongue and only those groups with less than 300 persons as their mother-tongue are included in the “other languages” category. Comparatively smaller language groups with 200+ persons as their mother-tongue are mentioned in the text. Many languages have sub-groups. Those who are interested can see the reference for more details.

Hindi is the official language in Jharkhand and Urdu has been declared as an additional official language.

Religions in Pakartanr CD block (2011)
Religion	Percent
Christianity	53.44%
Hinduism	39.10%
Sarna	6.14%
Islam	0.62%
Other or not stated	0.70%

According to the Population by Religious Communities 2011 data, in the Pakrtanr subdistrict, Christians numbered 20,043 and formed 53.44% of the population, followed by (number of persons and percentage of population in brackets) Hindus (14,664/ 39.10%), Muslims (233/ 0.62%), persons who did not state their religion (202/ 0.54%), and ‘Other religious communities’ (2,365/ 6.31%).

Scheduled Tribes numbered 424,407 and formed 70.78% of the total population of Simdega district. Within the scheduled tribes the more populous tribes were (percentage of ST population in 2011 in brackets): Munda, Patars (33.61%), Kharia, Dhelki Kharia, Dudh Kharia, Hill Kharia (25.42%), Oraon, Dhangar Oraons (20.13%), Gonds (5.77%) and Lohras (5.32%).

== Economy ==
=== Overview ===
The District Census Handbook, Simdega, mentions, “Simdega is one of the least developed districts in the country... As per the survey conducted for the year 1997 –2002 five-year plan more than 60% of population is below poverty line.” Another report says that 80% and over of the population of Simdega district were in the BPL category in 2004–2005. In 2011-12, the proportion of BPL population in Simdega district came down to 38.26%. According to a study in 2013 (modified in 2019), "the incidence of poverty in Jharkhand is estimated at 46%, but 60% of the scheduled castes and scheduled tribes are still below poverty line."

=== Livelihood ===
Livelihood
in Pakartanr CD block
1. Cultivators (52.5%)
2. Agricultural labourers (39.0%)
3. Household industries (3.34%)
4. Other Workers (5.47%)

In Pakartanr CD block in 2011, amongst the class of total workers, cultivators numbered 9,396 and formed 52.54%, agricultural labourers numbered 7,005 and formed 38.95%, household industry workers numbered 661 and formed 3.34% and other workers numbered 983 and formed 5.47%. Total workers numbered 17,985 and formed 47.95% of the total population, and non-workers numbered 19,522 and formed 52.05% of the population.

=== Infrastructure ===
There are 31 inhabited villages in Pakartanr CD block. In 2011, 7 villages had power supply. 31 villages had well water (covered/ uncovered), 23 villages had hand pumps, and all villages have drinking water facility. 7 villages had post offices, 6 villages had sub post offices, 24 villages had mobile phone coverage. 31 villages had pucca (paved) village roads, 16 villages had bus service (public/ private), 4 villages had autos/ modified autos,11 villages had taxi/ vans, 20 villages had tractors. 1 village had a bank branch, 12 villages had ration shops, 22 villages had assembly polling stations.

=== Agriculture ===
According to the District Census Handbook, Simdega, the rural population depends mainly on agriculture for a living. Agriculture in Simdega is in a very primitive state. The district has about 32% of forested area. Out of 1,34,024 hectares of cultivable land only 4,669.83 hectares of land is irrigated. Agriculture is mainly dependent on seasonal rain. The average rainfall of the district is 1100–1200 mm but much of it remains unutilised.

=== Backward Regions Grant Fund ===
Simdega district is listed as a backward region and receives financial support from the Backward Regions Grant Fund. The fund, created by the Government of India, is designed to redress regional imbalances in development. As of 2012, 272 districts across the country were listed under this scheme. The list includes 21 districts of Jharkhand.

== Education ==
Pakartanr CD block had 4 villages with pre-primary schools, 31 villages with primary schools, 16 villages with middle schools, 3 villages with secondary schools, 1 village with senior secondary school, all villages had educational facility.
.*Senior secondary schools are also known as Inter colleges in Jharkhand

== Healthcare ==
Pakartanr CD block had 11 villages with primary health subcentres, 4 villages with maternity and child welfare centres, 2 villages with family welfare centres, 4 villages with medicine shops.
.*Private medical practitioners, alternative medicine etc. not included
