= Bansjore =

- Village
- Location in Jharkhand, India Bansjore (India)
- Coordinates: 22.4344°N 84.7262°E
- Country: India
- State: Jharkhand
- District: Simdega

Government
  - Type: Federal democracy

Population (2011)
  - Total: 4,282

Languages *
  - Official: Hindi, Urdu
- Time zone: UTC+5:30 (IST)
- PIN: 835226
- Telephone/ STD code: 06525
- Vehicle registration: JH 20
- Literacy: 61.50%
- Lok Sabha constituency: Khunti
- Vidhan Sabha constituency: Kolebira
- Website: simdega.nic.in

Bansjore is a village in the Bansjore CD block in the Simdega subdivision of the Simdega district in the Indian state of Jharkhand. 7542868321call

== Geography ==
Cities, towns and locations in Simdega district in South Chotanagpur Division
M: municipality, R: rural/ urban centre, T: tourist centre
Owing to space constraints in the small map, the actual locations in a larger map may vary slightly

=== Location ===
Bansjore is located at 22.4344°N 84.7262°E

=== Area overview ===
In the area presented in the map alongside, "the landscape is formed of hills and undulating plateau" in the south-western part of the Chota Nagpur Plateau. About 32% of the district is covered with forests (mark the shaded portions in the map.) It is an overwhelmingly rural area with 92.83% of the population living in the rural areas. A major portion of the rural population depends on rain-fed agriculture (average annual rainfall: 1,100-1,200 mm) for a living.

Note: The map alongside presents some of the notable locations in the district. All places marked in the map are linked in the larger full screen map.

== Civic administration ==
=== Police station ===
There is a police station at Bansjore.

=== CD block HQ ===
The headquarters of Bansjore CD block are located at Bansjore village.

== Demographics ==
According to the 2011 Census of India, Bansjor had a total population of 4,282, of which 2,166 (51%) were males and 2,094 (49%) were females. Population in the age range 0–6 years was 555. The total number of literate persons in Bansjor was 2,292 (61.50% of the population over 6 years.

(*For language details see Bansjore block#Language and religion)

== Education ==
S.S. High School is a Hindi-medium coeducational institution established in 1957. It has facilities for teaching in class VI to class X. The school has a playground and a library with 576 books.
