= Bano railway station =

Railway station in Jharkhand

Bano Station

General information
- Location: Bano, Simdega district, Jharkhand; India
- Coordinates: 23°26′48″N 84°42′24″E
- Elevation: 452 metres (1,483 ft)
- System: Indian Railways station
- Line: Hatia-Rourkela line

Construction
- Parking: Available

Other information
- Status: Functional
- Station code: BANO
- Zone(s): South Eastern Railway
- Division(s): Ranchi Division
Location

Bano Railway Station, station code BANO, is the railway station serving the village of Bano in the Simdega district in the Indian state of Jharkhand. Bano Station belongs to the Ranchi division of the South Eastern Railway zone of the Indian Railways.

== Facilities ==
The major facilities available are waiting rooms, retiring room, computerized reservation facility, reservation counter, vehicle parking etc. The vehicles are allowed to enter the station premises. Security personnel from the Government Railway Police (G.R.P.) are present for security. A Railway medical unit providing health facilities is located near Bano station.

=== Platforms ===
The platforms are interconnected with foot overbridge (FOB).

== Trains ==
Several electrified local passenger trains and express trains run from Bano to neighbouring destinations. Many passenger and express trains serve Bano station.

== Nearest airports ==
The nearest airports to Bano station are

- Birsa Munda Airport, Ranchi 95 kilometres (59 mi)
- Gaya Airport, Gaya 259 kilometres (161 mi)
- Lok Nayak Jayaprakash Airport, Patna 366 kilometres (227 mi)
- Netaji Subhash Chandra Bose International Airport, Kolkata
