= Simdega =

- City
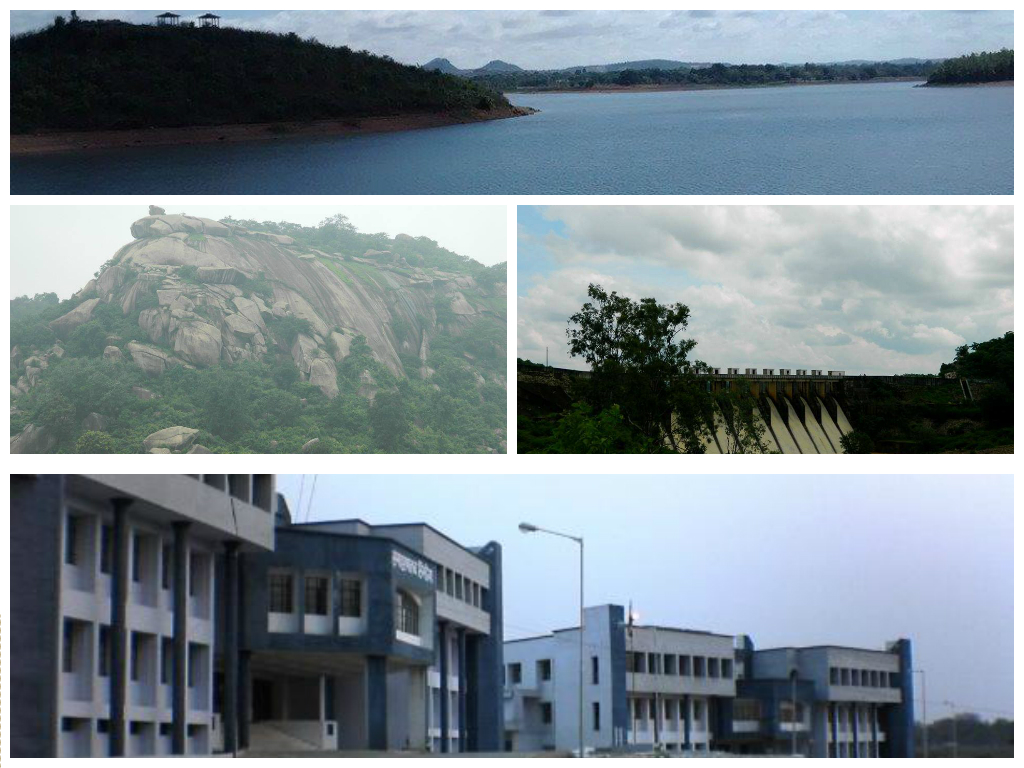
- Clockwise - Kelaghagh Dam, Hilly Terrain, District Administration Office
- Nickname: Nursery of Sports
- Location in Jharkhand, India Simdega (India)
- Coordinates: 22.62°N 84.52°E
- Country: India
- State: Jharkhand
- District: Simdega
- Established: 15 September 1915
- Founder: Birugarh Kingdom

Government
  - Type: Municipal Council
  - Body: Simdega Nagar Parishad
- Elevation: 418 m (1,371 ft)

Population (2011)
  - Total: 42,944
  - Rank: 22

Languages*
- Time zone: UTC+5:30 (IST)
- PIN: 835223
- Telephone code: +91-6525
- Vehicle registration: JH-20
- Website: simdega.nic.in

Simdega is a city in the Indian state of Jharkhand. Simdega is the administrative headquarters of the eponymous district and Subdivision. The city stands at an elevation of approximately 418 metres (1371 feet) above sea level and covers an area of 3,750 km^{2} (1,450 sq mi). Bounded in the north by Gumla, on the east by Ranchi and West Singhbhum, on the west by Jashpur Nagar, Chhattisgarh and on the south by Rourkela, Odisha. The distance between Rourkela and Simdega is 83 km. It is accessible by road through National Highways (National Highway 143) from Rourkela and Ranchi. The nearest railway station is Bano railway station.

Historically, the area was ruled by the Gajapati Kings of Gajapati Kingdom of Kalinga for centuries. The region is culturally an amalgamation of indigenous and Odia culture. The influence of Odia culture is significant in the area and the populace. The region also had historical relationship with Emperor Ashoka and Buddhism as evident from archaeological finds in the region.

== History ==
Simdega erstwhile the Kingdom of Kaisalpur-Birugarh Parganas which was ruled by the King Ganga Vamsi of the Gajapati Royal family of the Gajapati Kingdom for centuries even during the British Colonial era. Kesalpur was granted to Raja Hari Deo as a jagir by king Khukhragarh in 16th century. The Gajapati Royal Family still resides at Biru or Birugarh, situated at a distance of about 11 km from Simdega city on NH-23. This region of plateau is inhabited by the tribal and Odia Communities. The region has always been popular to missionaries, who established schools, convents, hospitals and parishes on the lands donated by the erstwhile Gajapati Kings and its subordinates. Christian Missionaries, especially Society of Jesus, helped in spreading the education by establishing several Christian schools in the region.

As located in South Jharkhand. Odia culture has highly influenced this region. The Odia Kings ruled this area for centuries even during the period of British Raj. The Gajapati Kings of Kaisalpur-Birugarh invited Odia-Brahmin scholars from Odisha to this region and gradually these Odia Brahmins settled in every corner of the Kaisalpur-Birugarh Kingdom, even today in the remotest villages of this region one can trace these Odia Brahmins families. The Gajapati Kings had donated acres of land and even villages and Zamindaris to them. The schools of this area has produced some eminent hockey players from this area who have represented India in Olympics and other National and International arena. It is known as cradle of Hockey in Jharkhand.

Development of Simdega is crucial to the development of south Jharkhand. Being in the proximity to Rourkela, Industrial Capital of Odisha, the region is bound to develop and cater to population in southern Jharkhand.

== Geography ==
Cities, towns and locations in Simdega district in South Chotanagpur Division
M: municipality, R: rural/ urban centre, T: tourist centre
Owing to space constraints in the small map, the actual locations in a larger map may vary slightly

=== Location ===
Simdega is located at 22.62°N 84.52°E.

Simdega has an area of 36.20 km^{2}.

=== Area overview ===
In the area presented in the map alongside, “the landscape is formed of hills and undulating plateau” in the south-western part of the Chota Nagpur Plateau. About 32% of the district is covered with forests (mark the shaded portions in the map.) It is an overwhelmingly rural area with 92.83% of the population living in the rural areas. A major portion of the rural population depends on rain-fed agriculture (average annual rainfall: 1,100-1,200 mm) for a living.

Note: The map alongside presents some of the notable locations in the district. All places marked in the map are linked in the larger full screen map.

== Politics ==
District	No.	Constituency	Name	Party	Alliance	Remarks	Simdega	70	Simdega	Bhushan Bara	INC
71	Kolebira	Naman Bixal Kongari					Simdega				INC

== Civic administration ==
Simdega, Muffasil, SC/ST and Mahila police stations are located in Simdega town.

The headquarters of Simdega CD block are located at Simdega town.

== Education ==
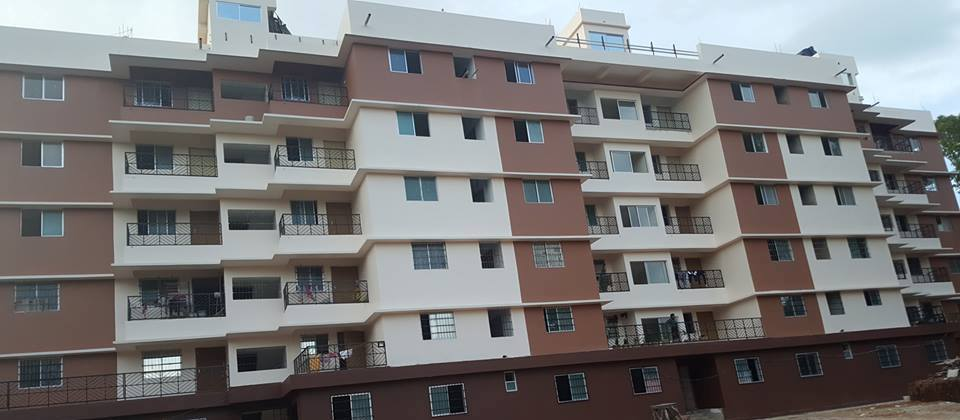
School of Nursing, SMC, Simdega

College level education is not adequate for the area as there are only two colleges of Ranchi University, namely Simdega College which being the constituent college of Ranchi University and other affiliated college is S.K. Bage College, Kolebira. St. Xavier's College, Simdega is another Jesuit institution of higher education in the city. There has been constant demand for improving the higher education in the city.

== Health ==
Health services are improving over a period of time. Apart from the community health centers ('CHC') at various Blocks of the district, there are two government hospital at Simdega namely;

1. District Hospital
2. Referral Hospital

St. Anne Dispensary and Nursing Home run by the "Daughter of St. Anne" at Church Road, Simdega. Shanti Bhavan Medical Centre a super- specialty Hospital at Biru, Simdega modelled on Christian Medical College & Hospital has been established by Calvary Gospel Ministry, USA. providing the best of medical facilities in collaboration with Christian Medical College & Hospital, Vellore, Tamil Nadu.The Hospital have medical experts from India and abroad.A new medical college and nursing school is also proposed to be opened in the hospital.

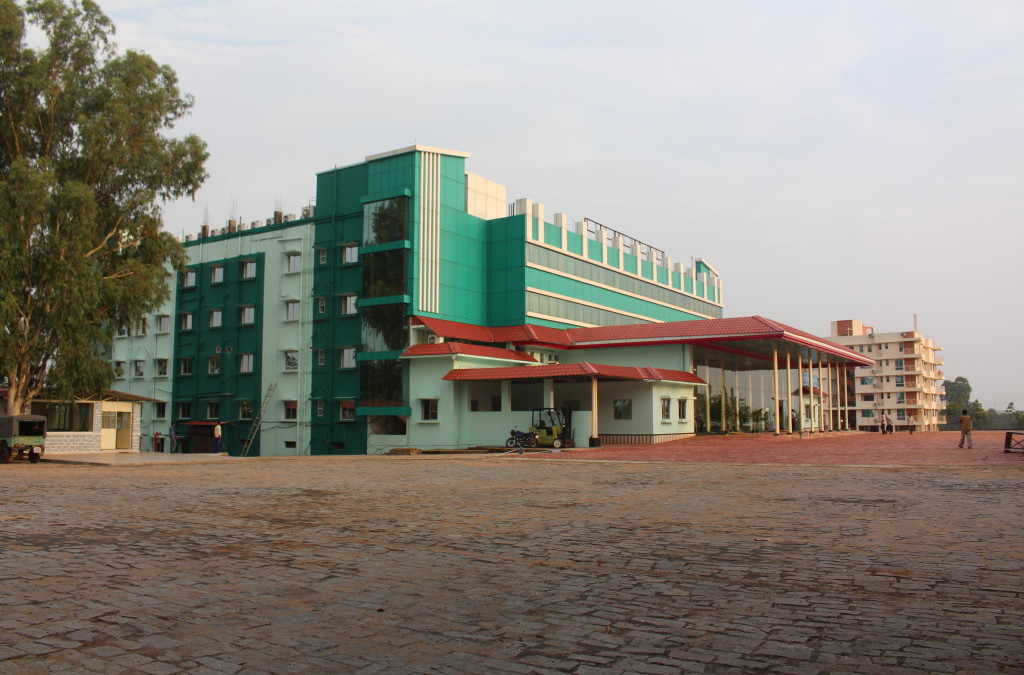
Shanti Bhavan Medical Centre

== Demographics ==
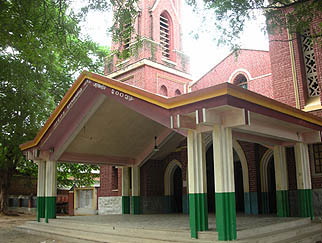
St. Anne's Cathedral, Simdega

According to the 2011 Census of India, Simdega had a total population of 42,944 of which 21,884 (51%) were males and 21,060 (49%) were females. Population in the age range 0–6 years was 5,421. The total number of literate persons in Simdega was 32,067 (85.46% of the population over 6 years.

(*For language details see Simdega block#Language and religion)

== Sports ==
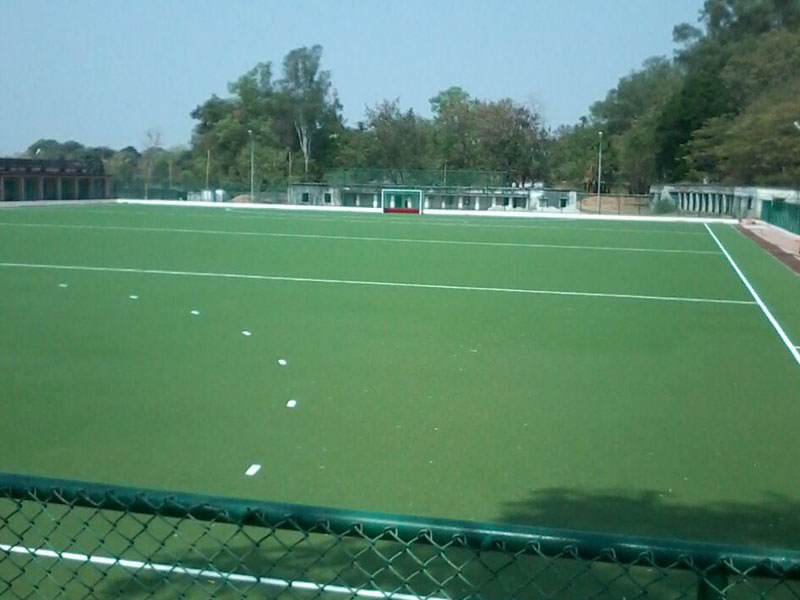
Simdega Hockey Stadium

Simdega is also known as 'Cradle of Hockey' in the state. It have given top notch sportsman at Olympics representing the county. Sylvanus Dung Dung is former olympian who won Gold at 1980 Moscow Olympics in Hockey. Michael Kindo is another olympian winning Bronze at 1972 summer olympics. Asunta Lakra captain of India's women Hockey Team hails from Simdega.

Recently, the city has got an 'Astroturf Hockey Stadium' for budding Hockey players for the area. It has an outdoor stadium named Albert Ekka Stadium for other sports.

== Geography and climate ==
Simdega is located at 22.62°N 84.52°E. It has an average elevation of 418 metres (1371 feet). Simdega has warm and temperate climate. The rain in Simdega falls mostly in the winter, with relatively little rain in the summer. This climate is considered to be Csa according to the Köppen-Geiger climate classification. The average annual temperature in Simdega is 25.1 °C. In a year, the average rainfall is 1450 mm.The driest month is December, with 3 mm of rainfall. In August, the precipitation reaches its peak, with an average of 410 mm.The warmest month of the year is May, with an average temperature of 33.0 °C. At 17.9 °C on average, December is the coldest month of the year.

== Economy ==
Major part of the economy of Simdega is primarily based on Agriculture and Agriculture allied activities like Shellac production and animal husbandry and Aquaculture. The area has Animal husbandry farms for poultry, Emu, Ducks and pigs. The main crops of Simdega are paddy, corn, and groundnut. The region has fertile soil for cultivation of various fruits and vegetables which are consumed locally through local farmers market, giving emphasis to locally grown and sourced produce.

ATMA (Agriculture Technology Management Agency) is located in Simdega which gives education and training to local entrepreneurs about latest and scientific agricultural techniques including Animal Husbandry, Lac Production and Honey production.

Simdega's proximity to highly industrialized areas of Odisha provides the area with benefits of being closer to major industrial hubs of Odisha as its economy is dependent upon these industrial hubs in Odisha.

Recently, initiatives have been taken to increase tourism in the area mainly cultural tourism and eco-tourism.

=== Mineral, Diamond exploration and Power Projects ===
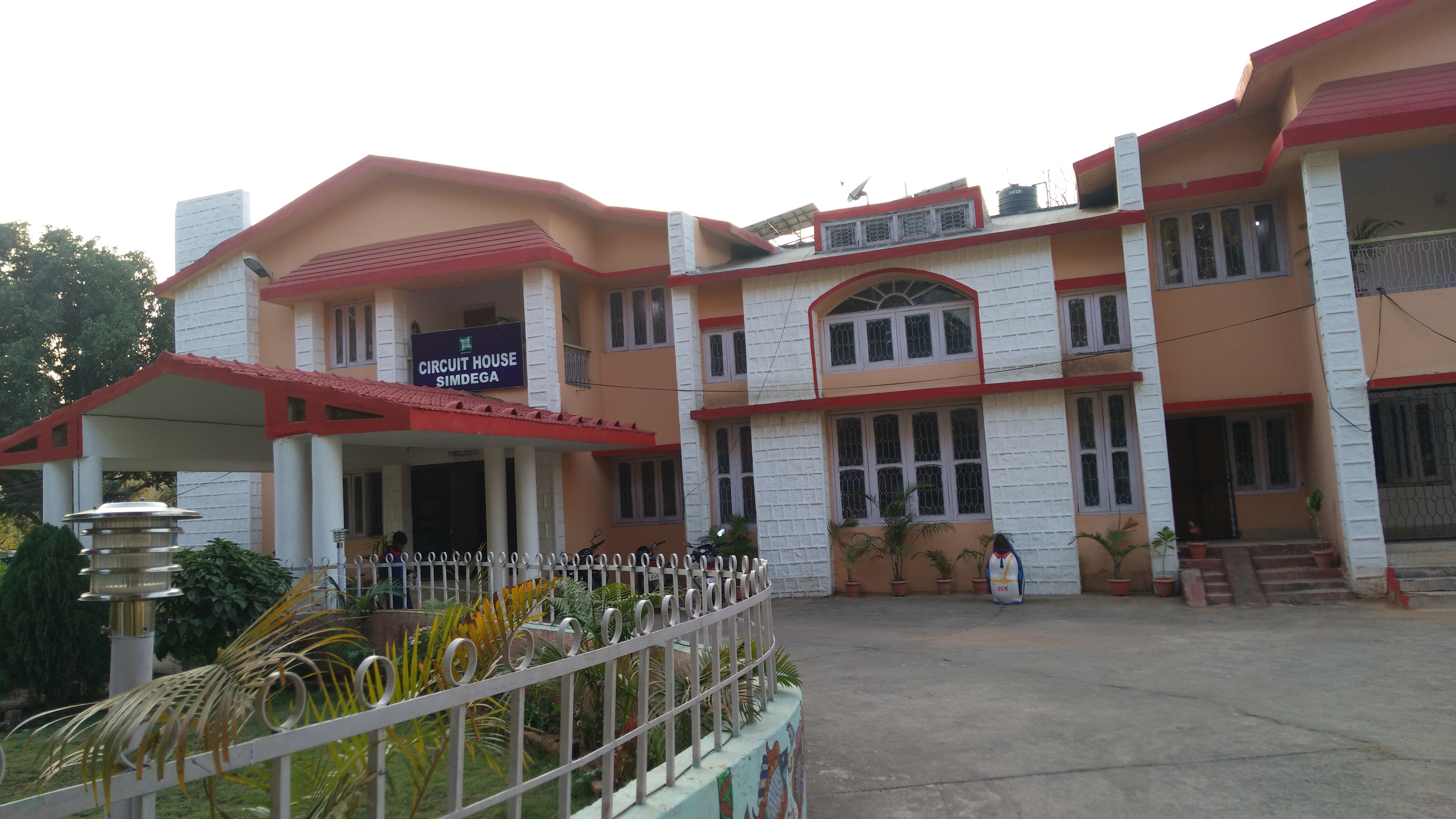
Circuit House, Simdega

- .Geological Survey of India (GSI) has undertaken exploration of Diamonds in Sankh River bed in Simdega. GSI has identified Simdega to have huge and promising Diamond Deposits.De Beers and Jindal Group have identified Simdega for Diamond exploration and mining in Jharkhand and Jindal Steel and Power has obtained a reconnaissance permit to undertake preliminary exploration of precious metals like gold, including stones such as diamonds in Simdega.
- Jindal Power, a subsidiary of JSPL has planned to come up with 2,640 MW power plant in Simdega.
- GSI has also found rich sources of uranium deposits in some areas of Simdega district

=== Small Hydel Power Projects ===
Jharkhand Renewal Energy Development Agency (JREDA) has commissioned and erected four Small Hydel Power Projects at Bano, Tethaitangar, Kurdeg and Kolebeira in Simdega to facilitate power generation up to 25MW.

=== Shellac ===
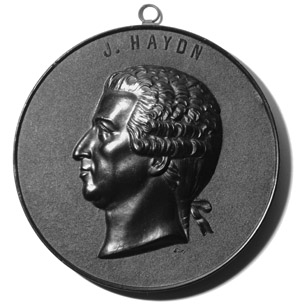
A decorative medal made in France in early 20th century moulded from shellac compound, the same used for phonograph records of the period.

Simdega is a leading producer of shellac in India which is a highly demanded product in Defence Ammunition and Aviation industry and dyes and paint industry. Majority of the produce is sold to neighbouring states which produce, market and sell the finished product. In spite of being a market leader in shellac, there is no shellac-based industry in Simdega.

== Transport ==
Simdega is located at the intersection of Jharkhand-Odisha-Chhattisgarh borders.

The city has a bus terminal where major routes buses ply from the city to cities in neighbouring states. Ranchi and Simdega are well connected by regular and deluxe air-Conditioned buses.

By road

Passenger buses and non-Stop buses run regularly from Ranchi, Gumla, Lohardaga, Sasaram Sambhalpur and Rourkela (Odisha).

1. Simdega to Ranchi - 155 km
2. Simdega to Gumla - 77 km.
3. Simdega to Gaya (Bihar)- 320 km
4. Simdega to Sambalpur ( Odisha)- 158 km
5. Simdega to Rourkela( Odisha) - 70 km

By air

Rourkela Airport is the nearest airport. Nearby airports include Ranchi Airport and Jharsuguda Airport.

By Train

Rourkela railway station is the nearest railway station. A new proposed railway route from Ranchi to Simdega via Lohardaga and Gumla will pass through the city.

== Tourist places ==
Simdega has potential for development of tourism, and can attract both domestic as well as foreign tourists.

- Palkot Wildlife Sanctuary: A wildlife sanctuary known for wild animals including leopard, sloth bear.

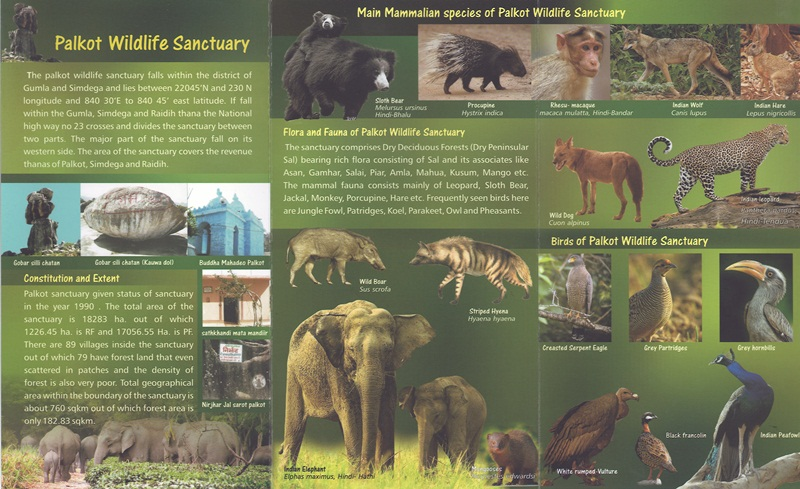
Palkot Wildlife Sanctuary

- Kelaghagh dam: A dam on Chhinda river in Simdega. There facility of boating through motor-boats and para-sailing. Kelaghagh dam also has a guest house for tourist accommodation.

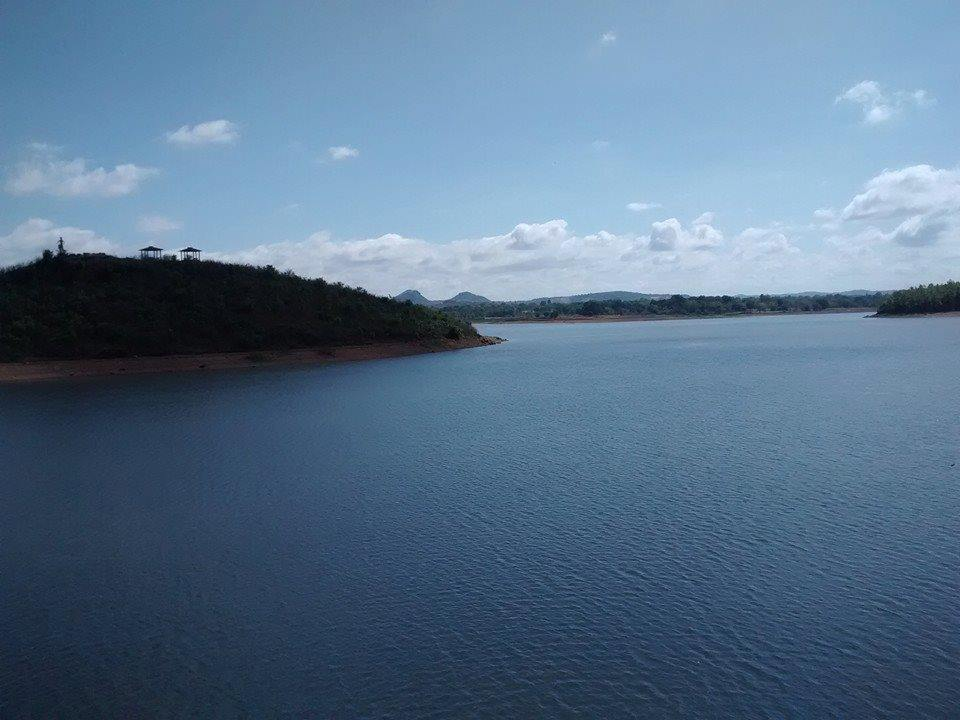
Kelaghagh Dam, Simdega

- Ram Rekha Dham: Ramrekha Dham is the most important situated on top of a hill and every year there is a fair during Kartik Purnima. It is said, that Lord Rama along with Sita and brother Laxman has visited this place and has left his mark (Foot prints) there. Some archaeological structures like agni kund, charan paduka, sita chulha, gupt ganga etc. shows that during Banwas period they followed this path.The Kaisalpur-Birugarh Royal family discovered and developed this place.
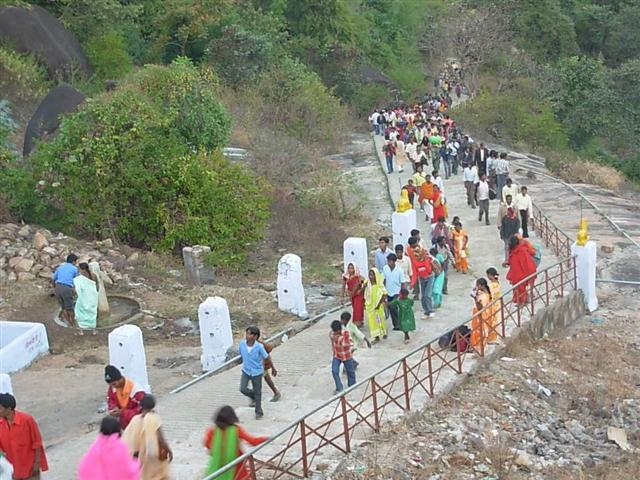
  Ramrekha Dham in Simdega

== Notable individuals ==
1. Sylvanus Dung Dung, Former Hockey player and Olympic gold medallist, 1980 Moscow Olympics.
2. Michael Kindo, Former Hockey player and Olympic bronze medallist.
