= Deo River =

Location
- Country: India
- State: Jharkhand

Physical characteristics
- Source: Gamharia Plateau
- Mouth
  - location: South Karo River

Deo River flows through West Singhbhum in the Indian state of Jharkhand. It rises on the western side of the Gamharia plateau and flows into the South Karo River after a course of about 35 miles (56 km). It receives the Puilgara, a fair-sized mountain stream, from the Santara forest block.

Mayurbhanj district of Odisha is bounded on its southeast by the Deo.
