= Simdega district =

Coordinates: 22°36′36″N 84°30′00″E

- District of Jharkhand
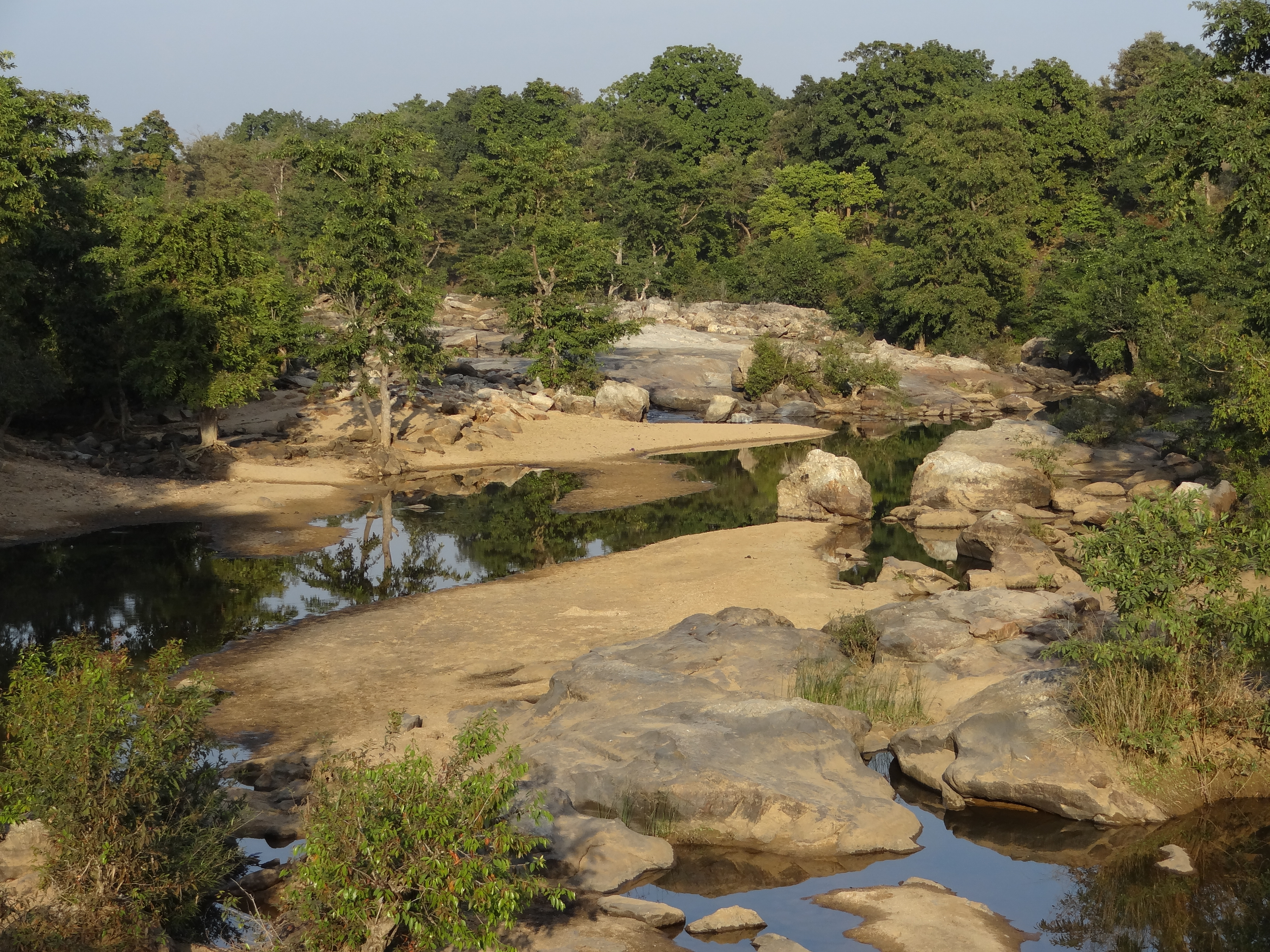
- River near Ambapani
- Interactive map of Simdega district
- Country: India
- State: Jharkhand
- Division: South Chotanagpur
- Headquarters: Simdega

Government
  - Deputy Commissioner: Mrs. Kanchan Singh (IAS)
  - Lok Sabha constituencies: Khunti
  - Vidhan Sabha constituencies: Simdega, Kolebira

Area
  - Total: 3,774 km^{2} (1,457 sq mi)

Population (2011)
  - Total: 599,578
  - Density: 158.9/km^{2} (411.5/sq mi)
  - Urban: 42,944

Demographics
  - Literacy: 67.99 per cent
- Time zone: UTC+05:30 (IST)
- Average annual precipitation: 85% mm
- Website: simdega.nic.in

Simdega district is one of the 24 districts of Jharkhand state, India, and Simdega town is the administrative headquarters of this district. As of 2011, this district is the least densely populated district and the third least populous district of Jharkhand after Lohardaga and Khunti districts. Simdega District was carved out from erstwhile Gumla district on 30 April 2001. As of 2009, it is a part of the Red Corridor.

== Administration ==
=== Blocks/Mandals ===
The following are the list of blocks (10 blocks) in Simdega district.

1. Bano block
2. Bansjore block
3. Bolba block
4. Jaldega block
5. Kersai block
6. Kolebira block
7. Kurdeg block
8. Pakartanr block
9. Simdega block
10. Thethaitangar block

=== Panchayats and villages ===
- List of villages in Simdega district

== Demographics ==
Historical population
| Year | Pop. | ±% |
|---|---|---|
| 1901 | 179,857 | — |
| 1911 | 210,096 | +16.8% |
| 1921 | 202,128 | −3.8% |
| 1931 | 237,371 | +17.4% |
| 1941 | 253,770 | +6.9% |
| 1951 | 281,912 | +11.1% |
| 1961 | 315,806 | +12.0% |
| 1971 | 378,731 | +19.9% |
| 1981 | 403,900 | +6.6% |
| 1991 | 446,421 | +10.5% |
| 2001 | 514,320 | +15.2% |
| 2011 | 599,578 | +16.6% |
Source: Census of India

Religions in Simdega district (2011)
| Christianity | 51.14% |
| Hinduism | 33.61% |
| ORP | 12.35% |
| Islam | 2.52% |
| Not stated | 0.38% |
*ORP mostly adherents of Sarnaism

According to the 2011 census, Simdega district has a population of 599,578, roughly equal to the nation of Solomon Islands or the US state of Wyoming. This gives it a ranking of 526th in India (out of a total of 640). The district has a population density of 160 inhabitants per square kilometre (410/sq mi). Its population growth rate over the decade 2001–2011 was 16.62%. Simdega has a sex ratio of 1000 females for every 1000 males; and a literacy rate of 67.99%. 7.16% of the population lives in urban areas. Scheduled Castes and Scheduled Tribes make up 7.45% and 70.78% of the population respectively.

Languages of Simdega district (2011)
1. Sadri (53.9%)
2. Mundari (22.5%)
3. Kharia (15.4%)
4. Hindi (4.02%)
5. Kurukh (1.44%)
6. Urdu (1.36%)
7. Others (1.33%)

At the time of the 2011 Census of India, 53.91% of the population spoke Sadri, 22.50% Mundari, 15.44% Kharia, 4.02% Hindi, 1.44% Kurukh and 1.36% Urdu as their first language. Simdega is the only district in India outside of the Northeast and the Nicobar Islands that has a Christian majority.

== Economy ==
In 2006, the Ministry of Panchayati Raj named Simdega one of the country's 250 most backward districts (out of a total of 640). It is one of the 21 districts in Jharkhand currently receiving funds from the Backward Regions Grant Fund Programme (BRGF).

== Popular places ==
- Palkot Wildlife Sanctuary: A wildlife sanctuary known for wild animals including leopard, sloth bear.

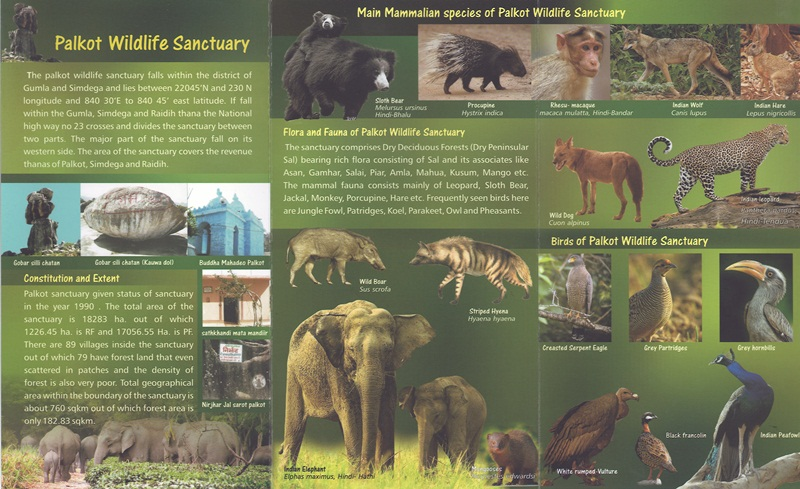
Palkot Wildlife Sanctuary

- Kelaghagh dam: A dam on Chhinda river in Simdega. There is facility of boating through motor-boats and para-sailing.

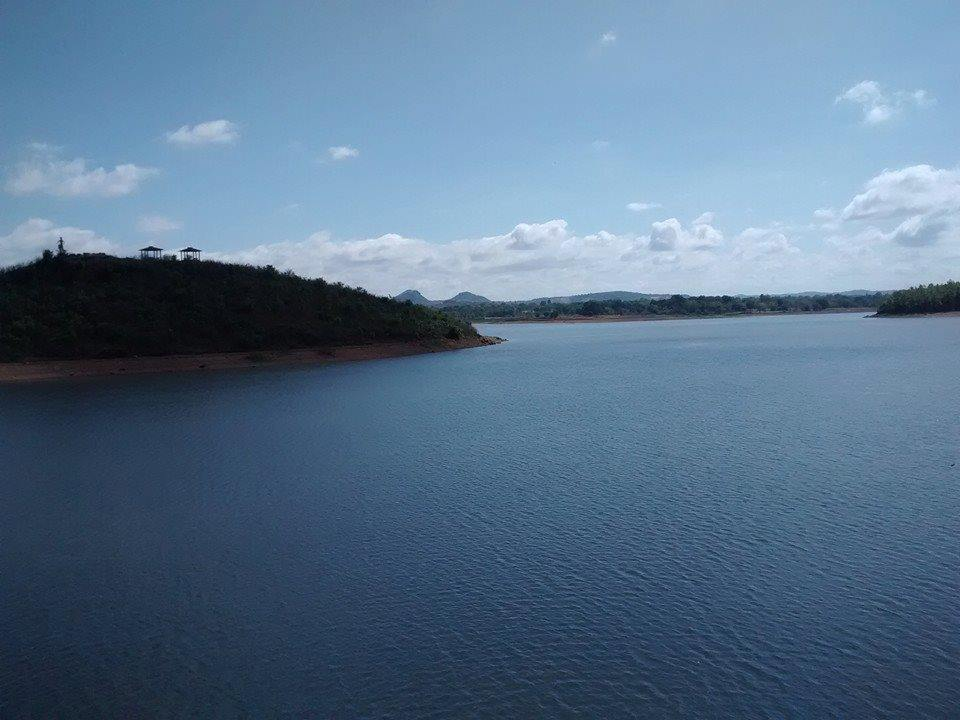
Kelaghagh Dam, Simdega

- Ramrekha Dham - it is commonly believed that Lord Rama had visited this place in his exile years.

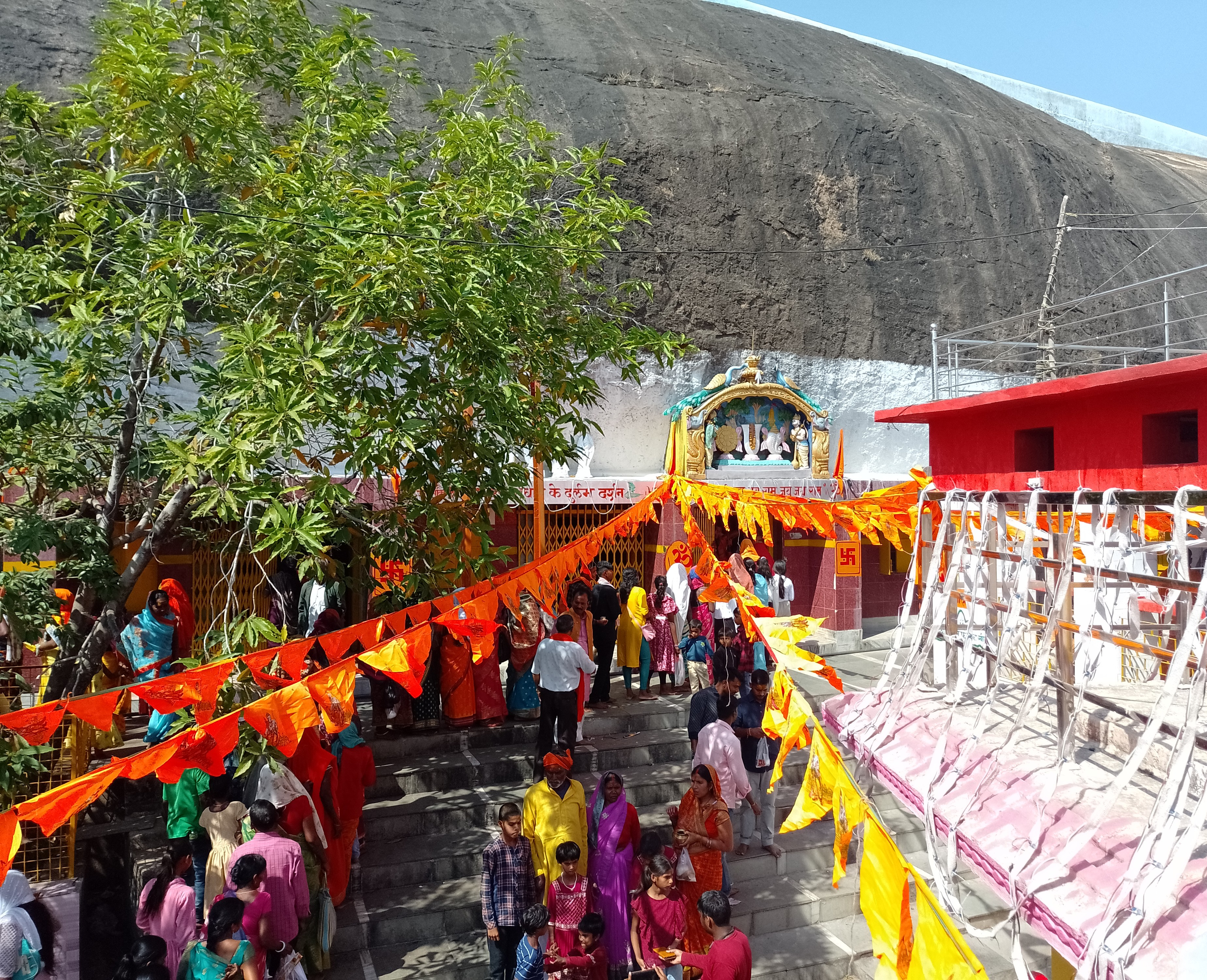
Ramrekha dham temple in Magh mela

== See also ==
- Districts of Jharkhand
