= Hatia–Durg Express =

Train in India

Hatia - Durg Express

Overview
- Service type: Express
- Status: Active
- Locale: Jharkhand, Odisha and Chhattisgarh
- First service: 2 April 2026; 3 months ago
- Current operator: South Eastern Railway (SER)

Route
- Termini: Hatia (HTE); Durg Junction (DURG)
- Stops: 9
- Distance travelled: 618 km (384 mi)
- Average journey time: 10h 45m
- Service frequency: Bi - Weekly
- Train number: 18641 / 18642

On-board services
- Classes: General Unreserved, Sleeper Class, AC 3rd Class, AC 2nd Class
- Seating arrangements: Yes
- Sleeping arrangements: Yes
- Catering facilities: Pantry Car
- Observation facilities: Large windows
- Baggage facilities: No
- Other facilities: Below the seats

Technical
- Rolling stock: ICF coach
- Track gauge: 1,676 mm (5 ft 6 in)
- Electrification: 25 kV 50 Hz AC Overhead line
- Operating speed: 130 km/h (81 mph) maximum, 57 km/h (35 mph) average including halts.
- Track owner: Indian Railways

The 18641 / 18642 Hatia–Durg Express is an express train belonging to South Eastern Railway zone that runs between the city Hatia of Jharkhand and Durg Junction of Chhattisgarh in India.

It operates as train number 18641 from Hatia to Durg Junction and as train number 18642 in the reverse direction, serving the states of Jharkhand, Odisha and Chhattisgarh.

== Services ==
• 18641/ Hatia–Durg Express has an average speed of 57 km/h and covers 618 km in 10h 45m.

• 18642/ Durg–Hatia Express has an average speed of 53 km/h and covers 618 km in 11h 40m.

== Route and halts ==
The important halts of the train are :

- Hatia
- Rourkela Junction
- Jharsuguda Junction
- Raigarh
- Champa Junction
- Bilaspur Junction
- Bhatapara
- Raipur Junction
- Durg Junction

== Schedule ==
• 18641 – 8:00 pm (Tuesday, Thursday) [Hatia] • 18642 – 7:35 pm (Wednesday, Friday) [Durg Junction]

== Coach composition ==
1. General Unreserved – 4
2. Sleeper Class – 8
3. AC 3rd Class – 3
4. AC 2nd Class – 1

== Traction ==
As the entire route is fully electrified, it is hauled by a Howrah Shed-based WAP-7 electric locomotive from Hatia to Durg Junction and vice versa.

== Rake reversal or rake share ==
No rake reversal or rake share.

== See also ==
Trains from Hatia :

1. Hatia–SMVT Bengaluru Weekly Express
2. Islampur–Hatia Express
3. Hatia–Pune Superfast Express
4. Hatia–Yesvantpur Superfast Express
5. Tapaswini Express

Trains from Durg Junction :

1. Durg–Visakhapatnam Vande Bharat Express
2. Durg–Jaipur Weekly Express
3. Chhattisgarh Sampark Kranti Superfast Express
4. Puri–Durg Express
5. Durg–Hazrat Nizamuddin Humsafar Express

== Notes ==
a. Runs one day in a week with both directions.
