= Lokmanya Tilak Terminus–Hatia Superfast Express =

Train in India

Overview
- Service type: Superfast
- First service: 3 July 2003; 22 years ago
- Current operator: South Eastern Railway zone

Route
- Termini: Lokmanya Tilak Terminus (LTT); Hatia (HTE)
- Stops: 18
- Distance travelled: 1,699 km (1,056 mi)
- Average journey time: 27h 30m
- Service frequency: Bi-weekly (Note: Runs two days in a week for every direction.)
- Train number: 12811/12812

On-board services
- Classes: AC 2 tier, AC 3 tier, Sleeper class, General Unreserved
- Seating arrangements: No
- Sleeping arrangements: Yes
- Catering facilities: On-board catering E-catering
- Observation facilities: LHB coach
- Entertainment facilities: No
- Baggage facilities: No
- Other facilities: Below the seats

Technical
- Rolling stock: 2
- Track gauge: 1,676 mm (5 ft 6 in)
- Operating speed: 62 km/h (39 mph), including halts

The Lokmanya Tilak Terminus–Hatia Superfast Express is a Superfast train belonging to South Eastern Railway zone that runs between Lokmanya Tilak Terminus and Hatia in India. It is currently being operated with 12811/12812 train numbers on bi-weekly basis.

== Service ==
- 12811/Mumbai LTT–Hatia Superfast Express has an average speed of 62 km/h and covers 1,699 km in 27h 30m.
- 12812/Hatia–Mumbai LTT Superfast Express has an average speed of 61 km/h and covers 1,699 km in 27h 55m.

== Route and halts ==
The important halts of the train are:

- Lokmanya Tilak Terminus
- Thane
- Kalyan Junction
- Nasik Road
- Manmad Junction
- Bhusaval Junction
- Akola Junction
- Badnera Junction
- Wardha Junction
- Nagpur Junction
- Gondia Junction
- Durg Junction
- Raipur Junction
- Bilaspur Junction
- Raigarh
- Jharsuguda Junction
- Rourkela Junction
- Hatia

== Coach composition ==
The train has LHB coach with a maximum speed of 160 km/h. The train consists of 23 coaches:

- 2 AC II Tier
- 5 AC III Tier
- 2 AC III Tier Economy
- 7 Sleeper coaches
- 1 Pantry car
- 3 General Unreserved
- 2 Seating cum Luggage Rake

== Traction ==
Both trains are hauled by a Santragachi Loco Shed-based WAP-4 electric locomotive from Kurla to Hatia and vice versa.

== Rake sharing ==
The train shares its rake with 12817/12818 Jharkhand Swarna Jayanti Express, 12873/12874 Jharkhand Swarna Jayanti Express (via Barkakana) and 12835/12836 Hatia–Yesvantpur Superfast Express.

== See also ==
- Lokmanya Tilak Terminus
- Hatia railway station
- Jharkhand Swarna Jayanti Express
- Jharkhand Swarna Jayanti Express (via Barkakana)
- Hatia–Yesvantpur Superfast Express
