= Jharkhand Swarna Jayanti Express (via Barkakana) =

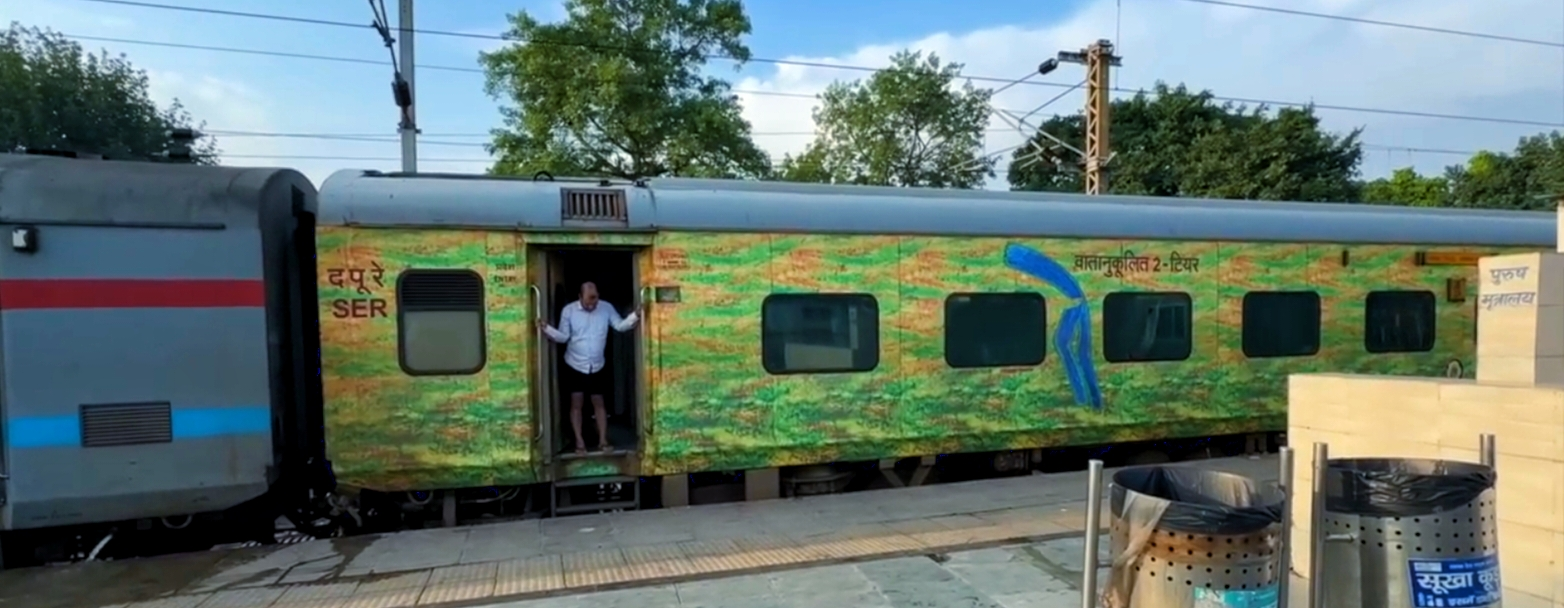
- Jharkhand Swarna Jayanti Express At Barkakana Junction railway station

Overview
- Service type: Swarna Jayanti Express
- Current operator: South Eastern Railway zone

Route
- Termini: Hatia (HTE); Anand Vihar Terminal (ANVT)
- Stops: 18
- Distance travelled: 1,328 km (825 mi)
- Average journey time: 24h 15m
- Service frequency: Tri-weekly (Note: Runs three days in a week for every direction.)
- Train number: 12873/12874

On-board services
- Classes: AC 2 tier, AC 3 tier, Sleeper class, General Unreserved
- Seating arrangements: No
- Sleeping arrangements: Yes
- Catering facilities: On-board catering E-catering
- Observation facilities: LHB coach
- Entertainment facilities: No
- Baggage facilities: No
- Other facilities: Below the seats

Technical
- Rolling stock: 2
- Track gauge: 1,676 mm (5 ft 6 in)
- Operating speed: 55 km/h (34 mph), including halts

The Jharkhand Swarna Jayanti Express is a Superfast train belonging to South Eastern Railway zone that runs between Hatia and Anand Vihar Terminal in India. It is currently being operated with 12873/12874 train numbers on tri-weekly basis.

== Service ==
- 12873/Jharkhand Swarna Jayanti SF Express has an average speed of 55 km/h and covers 1328 km in 24h 15m.
- 12874/Jharkhand Swarna Jayanti SF Express has an average speed of 55 km/h and covers 27h 30m km in 24h 10m.

== Route and halts ==
The halts of the train are:

- Hatia
- Ranchi Junction
- Muri Junction
- Ramgarh Cantonment
- Barkakana Junction
- Patratu
- Tori
- Latehar
- Barwadih Junction
- Daltonganj
- Garhwa Road Junction
- Garhwa
- Renukut
- Chopan
- Robertsganj
- Chunar Junction
- Allahabad Junction
- Kanpur Central
- Anand Vihar Terminal

== Coach composition ==
The train has standard LHB coach with max speed of 160 kmph. The train consists of 23 coaches:

- 1 AC II Tier
- 3 AC III Tier
- 13 Sleeper coaches
- 1 Pantry car
- 3 General Unreserved
- 2 Seating cum Luggage Rake

== Traction ==
These trains are hauled by a Tatanagar-based WAP-7 or WAP-4 from Hatia to ANVT and vice versa.

== Rake sharing ==
The train shares its rake with 12817/12818 Jharkhand Swarna Jayanti Express, 12811/12812 Lokmanya Tilak Terminus–Hatia Superfast Express and 12835/12836 Hatia–Yesvantpur Superfast Express.

== See also ==
- Lokmanya Tilak Terminus
- Hatia railway station
- Jharkhand Swarna Jayanti Express
- Lokmanya Tilak Terminus–Hatia Superfast Express
- Hatia–Yesvantpur Superfast Express
