= Swarna =

Swarna may refer to

- Swarna Mallawarachchi (born 1948), Sri Lankan actress
- Swarna Jayanti Express, an Indian train
- Swarna Jayanti Rajdhani Express, an Indian Rajdhani train
- Lucknow Swarna Shatabdi Express, an Indian train
- Swarna Kamalam, a 1988 Indian Telugu-language film
- Swarna Trishna (Bengali film), a 1990 Indian Bengali-language film
