= NKM =

NKM may refer to:

- Nagoya Airfield in Japan
- Nathalie Kosciusko-Morizet, French politician
- Namkon railway station, Jharkhand, India
