= Millennium Superfast Express =

Train in India

Overview
- Service type: Swarna Jayanti Express
- Locale: Kerala, Tamil Nadu, Andhra Pradesh, Telangana, Maharashtra, Madhya Pradesh, Rajasthan, Uttar Pradesh, Haryana & Delhi
- First service: 3 January 2000; 26 years ago
- Current operator: Southern Railway

Route
- Termini: Ernakulam Junction (ERS); Hazrat Nizamuddin (NZM)
- Stops: 26
- Distance travelled: 2,807 km (1,744 mi)
- Average journey time: 47 hrs 30 mins
- Service frequency: Weekly.
- Train number: 12645 / 12646

On-board services
- Classes: AC 2 Tier, AC 3 Tier, Sleeper Class, General Unreserved
- Seating arrangements: Yes
- Sleeping arrangements: Yes
- Catering facilities: On-board catering, E-catering
- Observation facilities: Large windows
- Baggage facilities: Available
- Other facilities: Below the seats

Technical
- Rolling stock: LHB coach
- Track gauge: 1,676 mm (5 ft 6 in)
- Operating speed: 130 km/h (81 mph) maximum, 60 km/h (37 mph) average including halts.
Route map
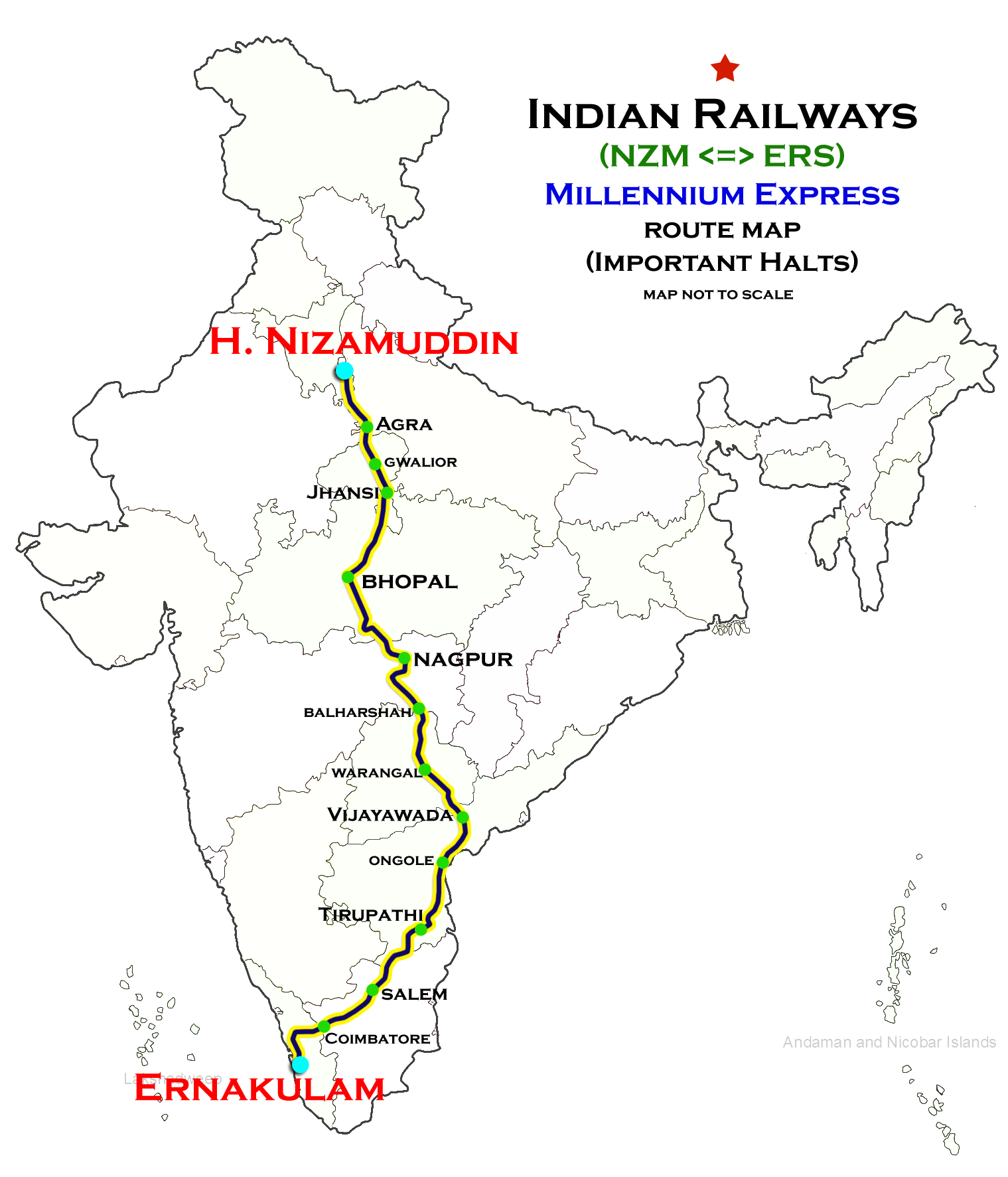

The 12645 / 12646 Millennium Superfast Express is a Superfast Express train belonging to Indian Railways - Southern Railway zone that runs between Ernakulam Junction and Hazrat Nizamuddin in India.

It operates as train number 12645 from Ernakulam Junction to Hazrat Nizamuddin and as train number 12646 in the reverse direction serving the 8 states of Kerala, Tamil Nadu, Andhra Pradesh, Telangana, Maharashtra, Madhya Pradesh, Uttar Pradesh and Delhi.

== Coaches ==
The 12645 / 12646 Millennium Superfast Express has 2 AC 2 tier, 6 AC 3 tier, 8 Sleeper Class, 4 General Unreserved and 2 SLR (Seating cum Luggage Rake) Coaches. It does not carry a Pantry car coach but carries a green bogie for movement of fruits and vegetables.

As is customary with most train services in India, Coach Composition may be amended at the discretion of Indian Railways depending on demand.

== Service ==
The 12645 Millennium Superfast Express covers the distance of 2,807 km (1,744 mi) in 47 hours 30 mins (60 km/h) and in 48 hours 05 mins as 12646 Millennium Superfast Express (59 km/h).

As the average speed of the train is above 55 km/h (34 mph), as per Indian Railways rules, its fare includes a Superfast surcharge.

== Routeing ==
The 12645 / 12646 Millennium Superfast Express runs from Ernakulam Junction via Coimbatore Junction, Erode Junction, Katpadi Junction, Renigunta Junction, Gudur, Vijayawada Junction, Warangal, Balharshah, Nagpur, Itarsi Junction, Bhopal Junction, Jhansi Junction, Agra Cantonment, Mathura Junction to Hazrat Nizamuddin.

== Traction ==
As route is fully electrified, it is hauled by an Erode Loco Shed based WAP-7 or WAP-4 electric locomotive on its entire journey.

== Operation ==
12645 Millennium Superfast Express runs from Ernakulam Junction every Saturday reaching Hazrat Nizamuddin on the 3rd day.

12646 Millennium Superfast Express runs from Hazrat Nizamuddin every Tuesday reaching Ernakulam Junction on the 3rd day .
