= Hatia–Rourkela line =

Railway route in India

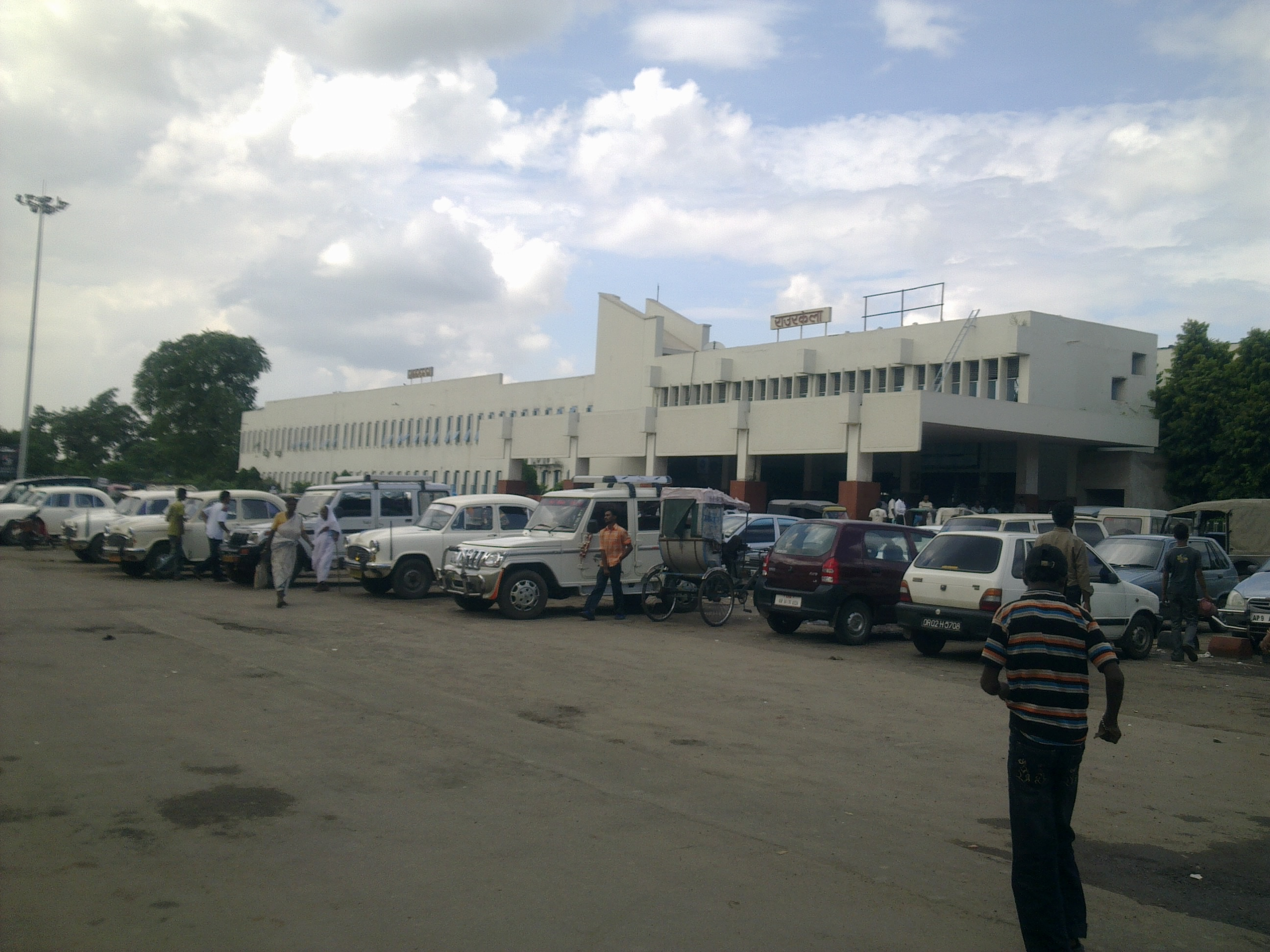
- Rourkela railway station the starting station of Hatia–Rourkela line

Overview
- Status: Operational
- Owner: Indian Railways
- Locale: Jharkhand, Odisha
- Termini: Hatia; Rourkela
- Stations: 25

Service
- Type: Rail line
- Services: 1
- Operator(s): South Eastern Railway

History
- Opened: 1965 onwards

Technical
- Track length: 165 km
- Track gauge: 5 ft 6 in (1,676 mm) broad gauge
- Electrification: 2001–02 with 25 kV AC overhead line

The Hatia–Rourkela line is an Indian railway line connecting Hatia on the Netaji S.C.Bose Gomoh–Hatia line in Jharkhand with Rourkela on the Tatanagar–Bilaspur section in Odisha. This 165-kilometre (103 mi) track is under the jurisdiction of South Eastern Railway.

== History ==
In 1907 Adra was connected to the Grand Chord at Gomoh with a 1,676 mm (5 ft 6 in) wide 5 ft 6 in (1,676 mm) broad gauge line. The construction of the 143 kilometres (89 mi)-long broad-gauge Chandrapura–Muri–Ranchi–Hatia line was started in 1957 and was completed in 1961. The construction of this line included the conversion of the narrow-gauge Kotshila–Ranchi line to broad gauge. The Ranchi–Hatia–Bondamunda section was opened in 1965.

== Electrification ==
The electrification of Bondamunda Yard–Dumetra–Bangurkela link lines was done in 1998–99. The Bondamunda–Orga, Orga–Tati and Tati–Hatia sectors were electrified in 2001–02.

== Doubling Work ==
Doubling work on Hatia-Bandamunda railway section is going on at a fast pace. If everything goes well, the work will be completed by February 2024. General Manager of South-East Railway, Anil Kumar Mishra said these things to the journalists after inspecting the railway section on Saturday. He said that the work has been delayed due to the Naxalite incident. So far, 68 km railway line doubling work has been completed in this railway section from Hatia to Pakra station.

At the same time, doubling work is going on rapidly from Orga towards Hatia. He said that full help is being received from the state government regarding security. General Manager Mishra said that the work of 158.5 km in Hatia-Bandamunda doubling is quite challenging. Because, due to the rocky area, there is a delay in cutting stones. State-of-the-art machines have been installed for this. At the same time, due to it being a single line, trains are also running on that route. There are 13 big and 324 small bridges on this route.

The General Manager said that with the opening of the Hatia-Bandamunda line, the number of trains going to Mumbai and Bengaluru will increase. At the same time, the speed of trains will also increase and passengers will take less time. On the question of re-development of Hatia station, he said that tender will be floated before September 30 and work will start from November-December. At the same time, on the question of running Ranchi-Howrah Vande Bharat train, he said that it is the decision of the board.
