= Hatia–Pune Superfast Express =

Train in India

Hatia Pune Superfast Express
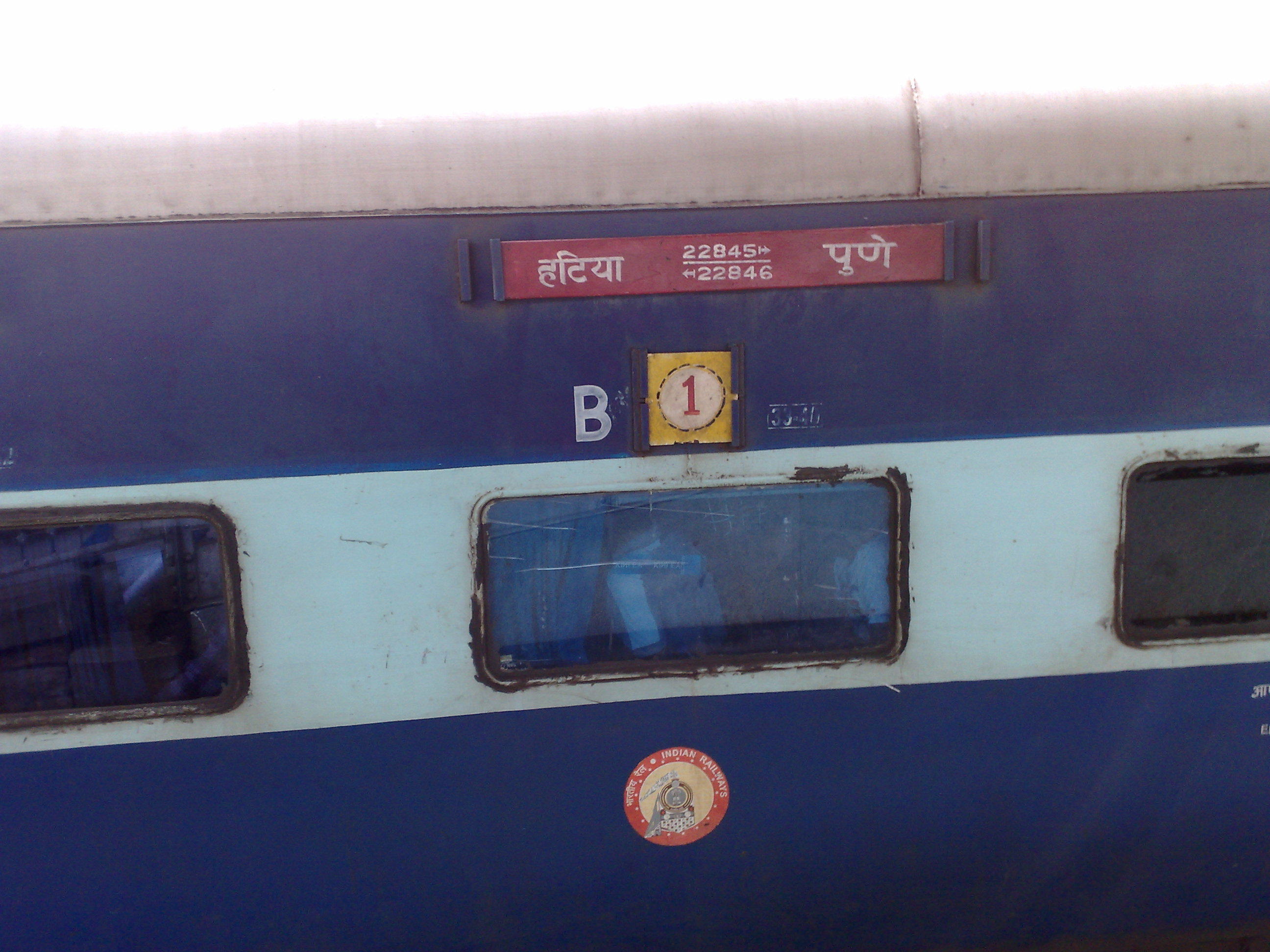

Overview
- Service type: Superfast
- Locale: Jharkhand, Odisha, Chhattisgarh, Maharashtra
- First service: 16 November 2011
- Current operator: South Eastern Railways

Route
- Termini: Hatia; Pune Junction
- Stops: 16
- Distance travelled: 1,774 km (1,102 mi)
- Average journey time: 30 hours 25 minutes as 22845 Pune Hatia Superfast Express, 30 hours 45 minutes as 22846 Hatia Pune Superfast Express
- Service frequency: 2 days a week. 22845 Pune Hatia Superfast Express – Wednesday & Sunday. 22846 Hatia Pune Superfast Express – Monday & Friday.
- Train number: 22845 / 22846

On-board services
- Classes: AC 2 tier, AC 3 tier, Sleeper Class, Second Class seating
- Seating arrangements: Yes
- Sleeping arrangements: Yes
- Catering facilities: No pantry car attached but available

Technical
- Rolling stock: Standard Indian Railways coaches
- Track gauge: 1,676 mm (5 ft 6 in)
- Operating speed: 110 km/h (68 mph) maximum 58.01 km/h (36 mph), including halts

The 22845/46 Hatia–Pune Superfast Express is a Superfast Express train belonging to Indian Railways – South Eastern Railways that runs between Hatia and Pune Junction in India.

It operates as train number 22845 from Pune Junction to Hatia and as train number 22846 in the reverse direction.

== Coaches ==
The 22845/46 Hatia–Pune Superfast Express presently has 1 AC 2 tier, 3 AC 3 tier, 9 Sleeper Class, 4 Sleeper Class and 2 SLR (Seating cum Luggage Rake) coaches.

As with most train services in India, coach composition may be amended at the discretion of Indian Railways depending on demand.

== Service ==
The 22845/46 Hatia–Pune Superfast Express covers the distance of 303 kilometers in 4 hours 30 mins (67.33 km/h) in both directions.

As the average speed of the train is above 55 km/h, as per Indian Railways rules, its fare includes a Superfast surcharge.

== Routeing ==
The 22845/46 Hatia–Pune Superfast Express runs via Bilaspur Junction, Nagpur Junction, Badnera Junction, Bhusaval Junction, Daund Junction to Pune Junction.

It reverses direction at Daund Junction.

== Traction ==
An Ajni-based WAP-7 hauls the train from Hatia until Pune Junction.

== Time table ==
- 22846 Hatia–Pune Superfast Express leaves Hatia every Monday & Friday at 20:00 hrs IST and reaches Pune Junction at 02:45 hrs IST on the 3rd day.
- 22845 Pune–Hatia Superfast Express leaves Pune Junction every Wednesday & Sunday at 10:45 hrs IST and reaches Hatia at 17:10 hrs IST the next day.
