= Visakhapatnam Swarna Jayanti Express =

Coordinates: 17°41′18″N 83°13′07″E

Visakhapatnam Swarna Jayanti Superfast Express
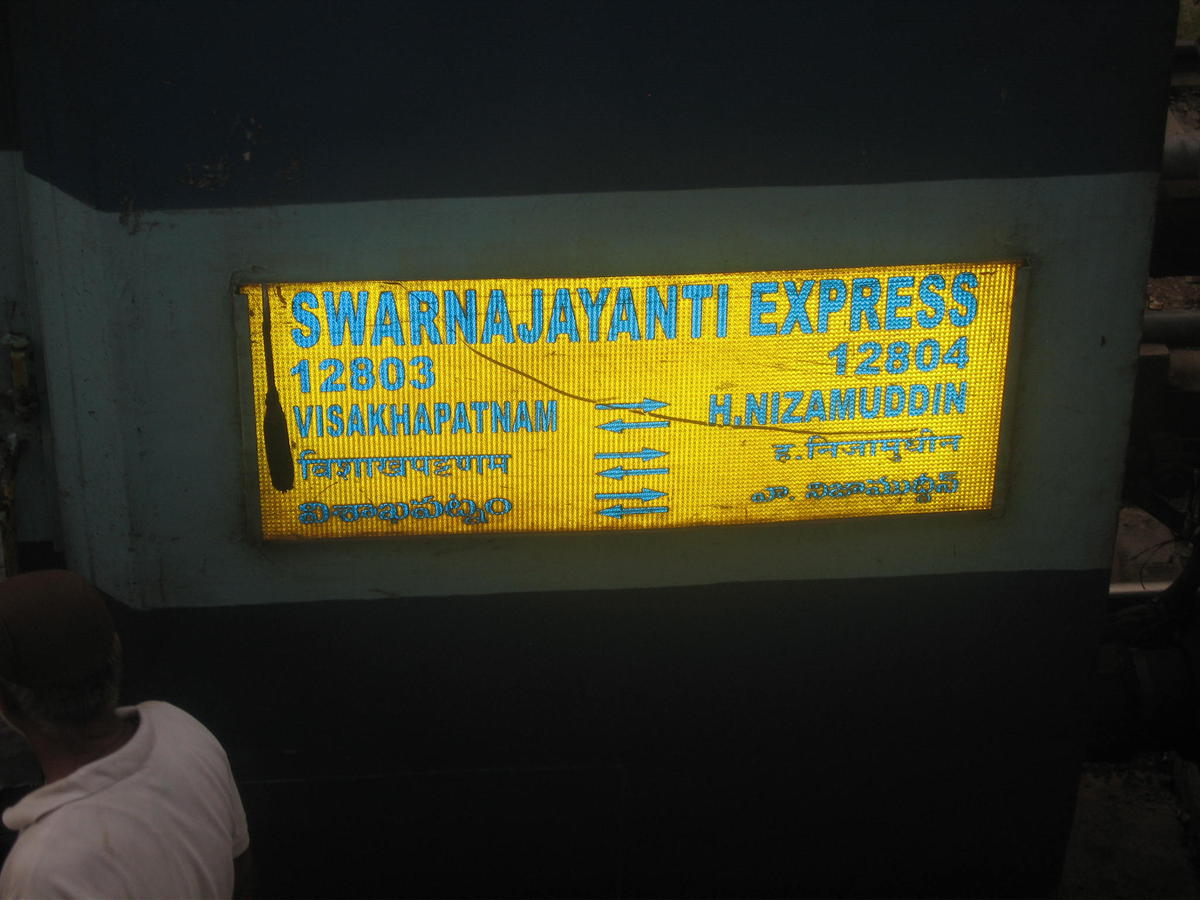

Overview
- Service type: Swarna Jayanti Express
- Locale: Andhra Pradesh, Telangana, Maharashtra, Madhya Pradesh, Uttar Pradesh, Haryana & Delhi
- First service: 28 October 1997
- Current operator: South Coast Railways

Route
- Termini: Visakhapatnam (VSKP); Hazrat Nizamuddin (NZM)
- Stops: 19
- Distance travelled: 2,093 km (1,301 mi)
- Average journey time: 32 hours 40 minutes
- Service frequency: Bi-weekly
- Train number: 12803 / 12804

On-board services
- Classes: AC 1 tier, AC 2 tier, AC 3 tier, Sleeper class, General Unreserved
- Seating arrangements: Yes
- Sleeping arrangements: Yes
- Catering facilities: Available
- Baggage facilities: Under the seats

Technical
- Rolling stock: LHB coach
- Track gauge: 1,676 mm (5 ft 6 in) (broad gauge)
- Operating speed: 63 km/h (39 mph) average with halts
Route map
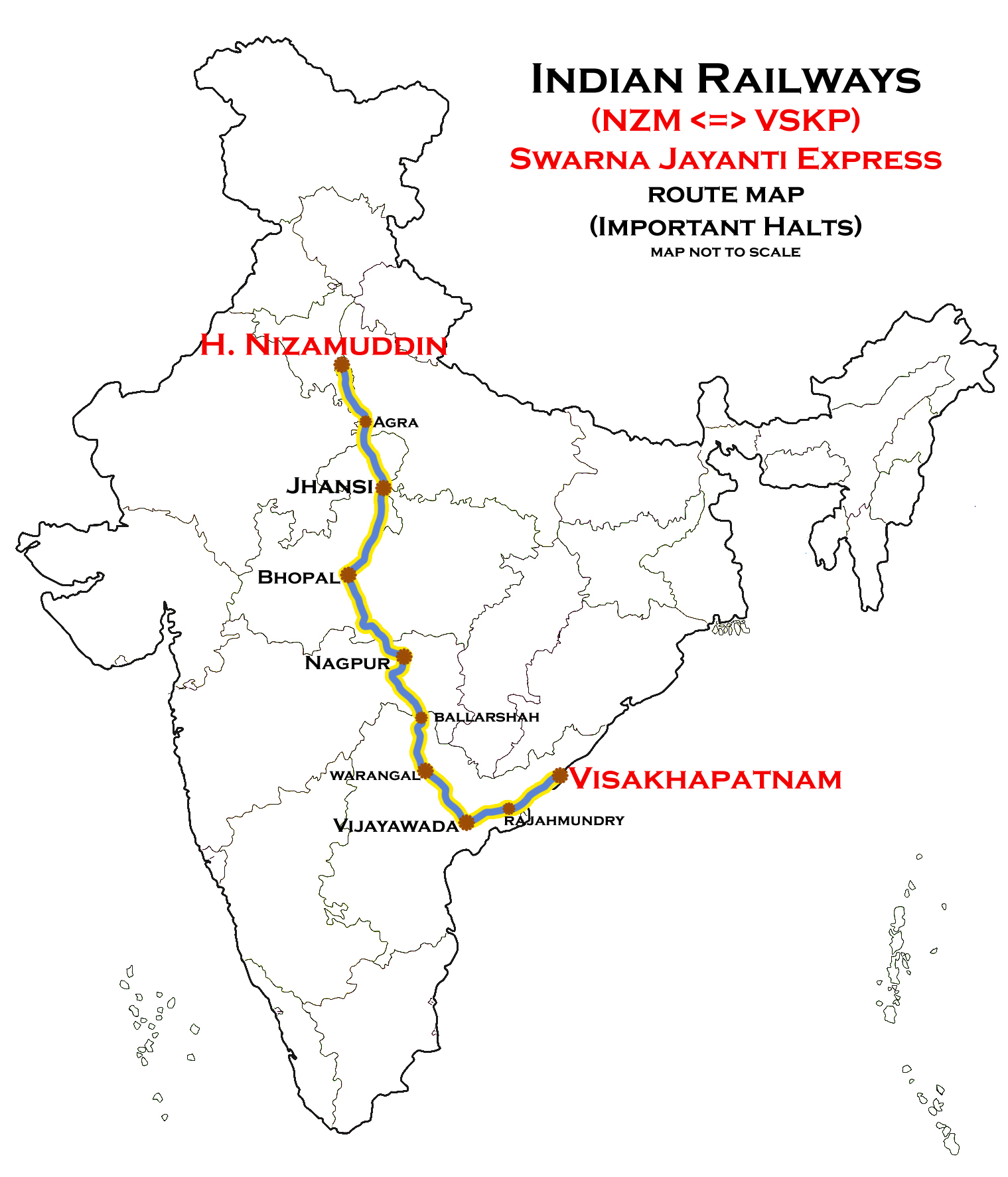

The 12803 / 12804 Visakhapatnam Swarna Jayanti Express is a "Superfast Express" train linking Visakhapatnam and the Hazrat Nizamuddin near New Delhi, India.

The express is organized by the South Coast Railways Waltair Division. It is named for the 50th Golden Jubilee year of India's independence. The average speed of the train is 61 km per hour.

== Route ==
The train runs twice a week. It starts from Visakhapatnam on Monday and Friday and reaches Hazrat Nizamuddin on Tuesday and Saturday, respectively. Similarly, it starts from Hazrat Nizamuddin on Sunday and Wednesday reaches Visakhapatnam on Monday and Thursday, respectively.

Train No. 12803 leaves Visakhapatnam at 08:30 hours IST (Indian Standard Time) and reaches Hazrat Nizamuddin at 17:10 hrs IST on the following day. Similarly Train No. 12804 leaves Hazrat Nizamuddin at 05:55 hrs and reaches Visakhapatnam at 17:25 hrs on the following day.

The train runs via Rajahmundry, Eluru, Vijayawada, Balharshah Junction, Nagpur, Itarsi, Bhopal, Jhansi, Gwalior and Agra.

The locomotive reverses its direction at Vijayawada.

== Rake sharing ==
This train runs with LHB coach and shares the rake with Samata Express

== Locomotive ==
This train is generally hauled by WAP-7 and WAP-5 locomotive of Lallaguda Shed.

== See also ==
- Express trains in India
