= Thiruvananthapuram Swarna Jayanti Express =

Passenger train in India

Swarna Jayanti Superfast Express
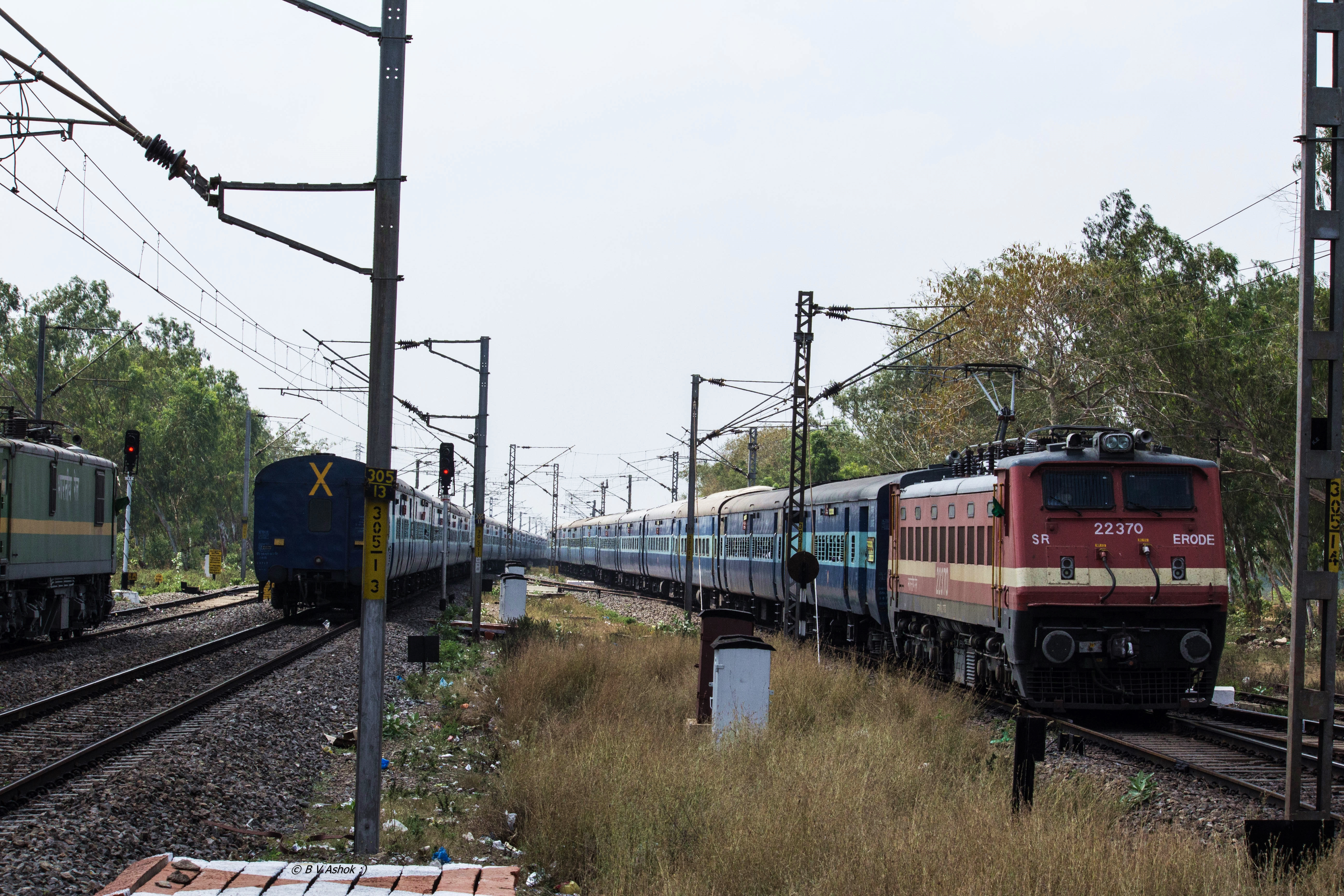
- Trivandrum Swarna Jayanti Express

Overview
- Service type: Swarna Jayanti Express
- First service: 28 August 1997; 29 years ago
- Current operator: Southern Railway zone

Route
- Termini: Thiruvananthapuram Central; Hazrat Nizamuddin
- Stops: 30 as 12643 and 29 as 12644
- Distance travelled: 3,018 km (1,875 mi)
- Average journey time: 52 hours 25 mins
- Service frequency: Weekly
- Train number: 12643 / 12644

On-board services
- Classes: AC 2 tier, AC 3 tier,AC 3tier economy Sleeper Class, General Unreserved & EOG
- Seating arrangements: Yes
- Sleeping arrangements: Yes
- Catering facilities: Yes

Technical
- Rolling stock: LHB
- Track gauge: 1,676 mm (5 ft 6 in)
- Operating speed: 59 km/h (37 mph)
Route map
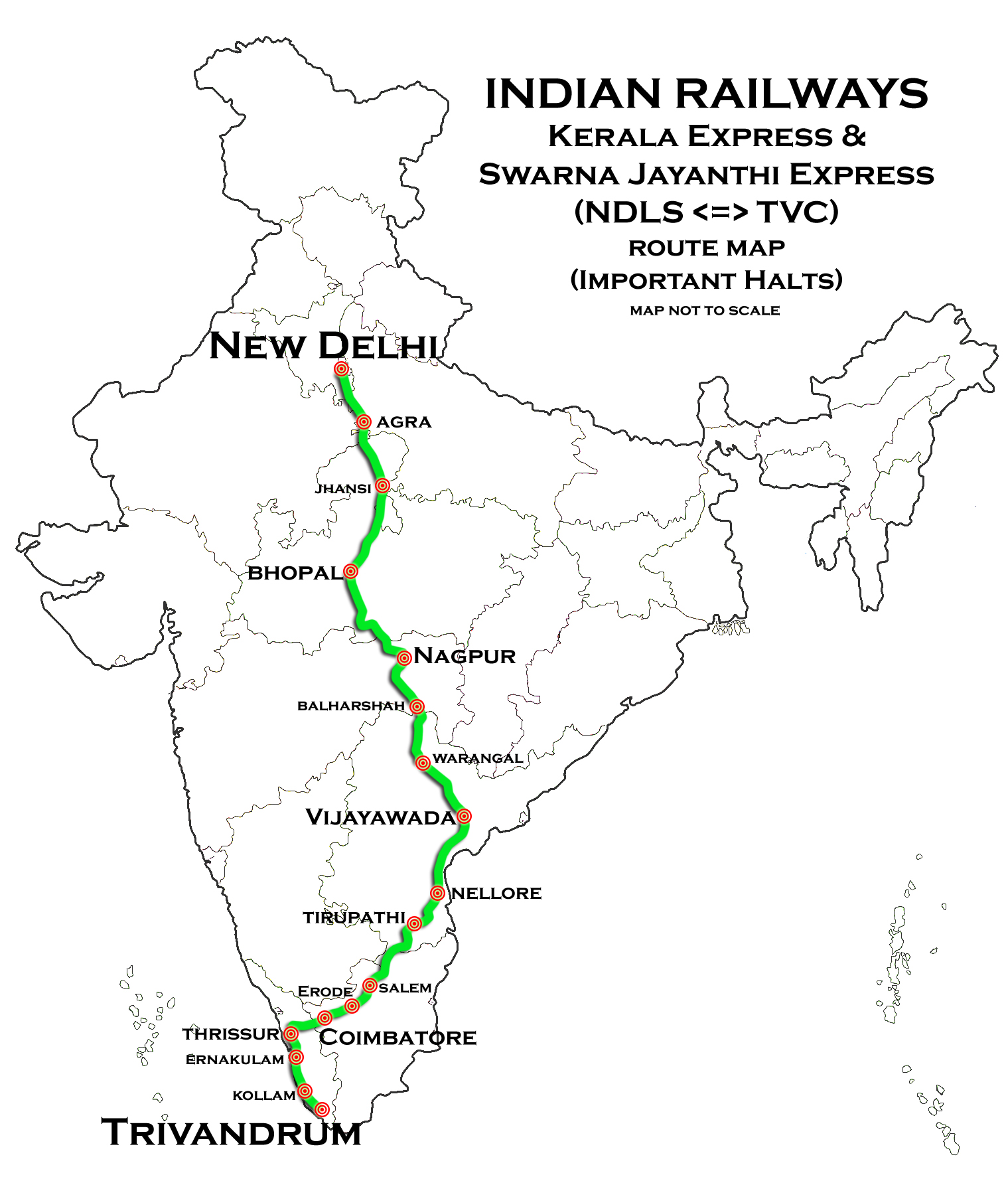

The 12643 / 44 Swarna Jayanti Superfast Express is an express train belonging to Indian Railways Southern Railway zone that runs between Thiruvananthapuram Central and Hazrat Nizamuddin in India.

It operates as train number 12643 from Thiruvananthapuram Central to Hazrat Nizamuddin and as train number 12644 in the reverse direction serving the states of Kerala, Tamil Nadu, Andhra Pradesh, Telangana, Maharashtra, Madhya Pradesh, Uttar Pradesh and Delhi.

== Coaches ==
The 12643 / 44 Swarna Jayanti Superfast Express gets an LHB coaches and it has one AC 2-tier, five AC 3-tier, 11 Sleeper Class, two general unreserved and two SLR (seating with luggage rake) coaches and two high capacity parcel van coaches. It carries a pantry car coach.

As is customary with most train services in India, coach composition may be amended at the discretion of Indian Railways depending on demand.

== Service ==
•The 12643 Thiruvananthapuram Central - Hazrat Nizamuddin Swarna Jayanti Superfast Express covers the distance of 3,018 km (1,875 mi) in 50 hours 55 mins (59 km/h) and in 53 hours 45 mins (56 km/h) as the 12644 Hazrat Nizamuddin - Thiruvananthapuram Central Swarna Jayanti Superfast Express.

• 12643 express departs TVC on Tuesdays and arrives NZM on Thursday.

• 12644 express departs NZM on Fridays and arrives TVC on Sunday.

• This train runs on a weekly basis.

As the average speed of the train is higher than 55 km/h (34 mph), as per railway rules, its fare includes a Superfast surcharge.

== Routing ==
The 12643 / 44 Swarna Jayanti Superfast Express runs from Thiruvananthapuram Central via Kollam Junction, Alappuzha, Ernakulam Junction, Palakkad Junction, Coimbatore Junction, Erode Junction, Renigunta Junction, Vijayawada Junction, Nagpur Junction, Itarsi Junction, Bhopal Junction, Jhansi Junction, Gwalior Junction, Agra Cantonment to Hazrat Nizamuddin.

== Traction ==
As the route is fully electrified, an Erode Junction or Royapuram based WAP-4 or WAP-7 locomotive powers the train end-to-end.
