= Mysore Swarna Jayanti Express =

Train in India

Mysuru Swarna Jayanti Express
Overview
- Service type: Swarna Jayanti Express
- Locale: Karnataka, Maharashtra, Madhya Pradesh, Rajasthan, Uttar Pradesh, Haryana and Delhi
- Current operator: South Western Railway

Route
- Termini: Mysuru Junction (MYS); Hazrat Nizamuddin (NZM)
- Stops: 30
- Distance travelled: 2,622 km (1,629 mi)
- Average journey time: 45 hours 10 minutes
- Service frequency: Weekly
- Train number: 12781 / 12782

On-board services
- Classes: AC First Class, AC 2 Tier, AC 3 Tier, Sleeper Class, General Unreserved
- Seating arrangements: Yes
- Sleeping arrangements: Yes
- Catering facilities: Available
- Observation facilities: Large windows
- Baggage facilities: No
- Other facilities: Below the seats

Technical
- Rolling stock: LHB coach
- Track gauge: 1,676 mm (5 ft 6 in)
- Operating speed: 58 km/h (36 mph)
Route map
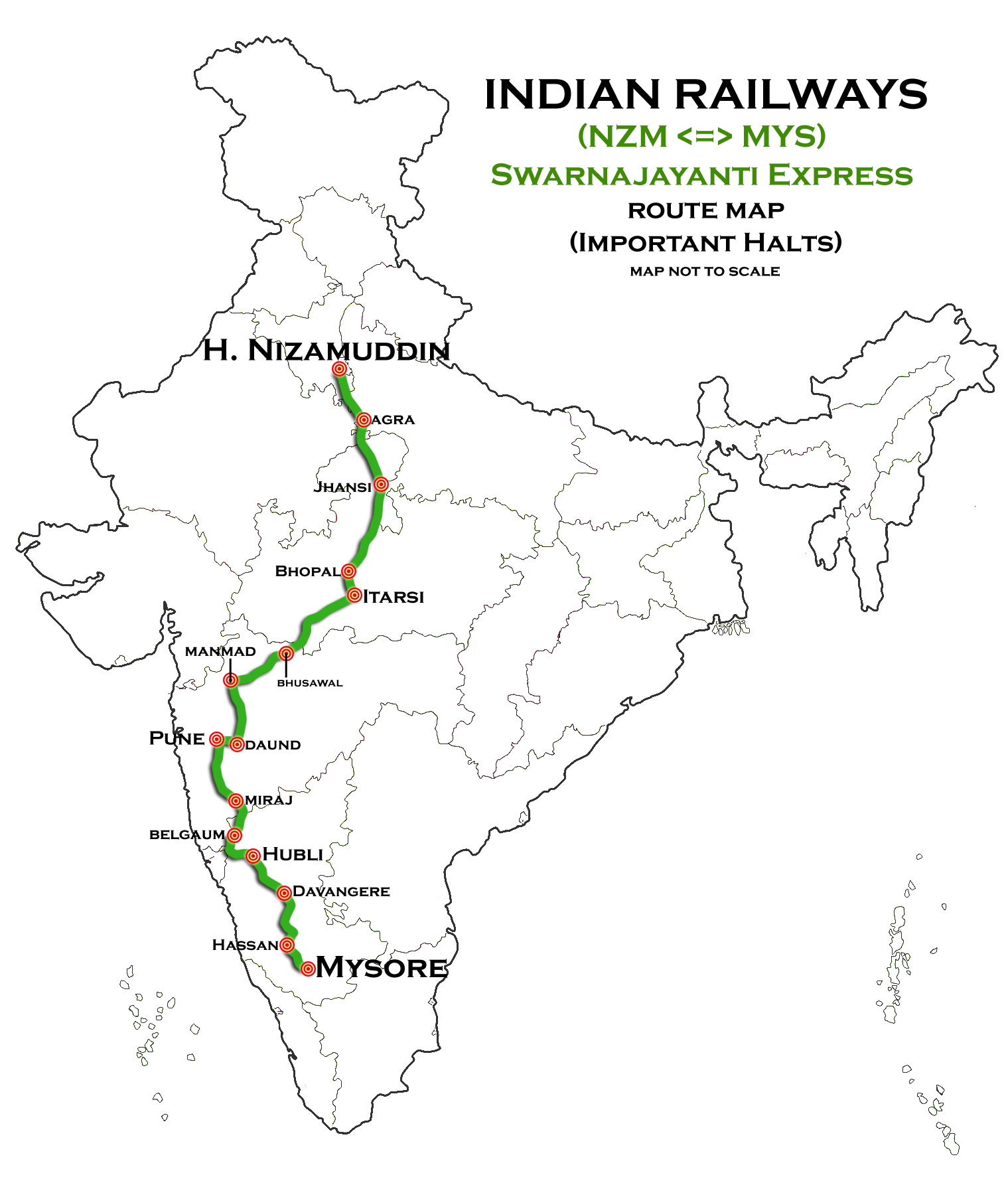

The 12781 / 12782 Mysuru Swarna Jayanti Express is an Express train belonging to Indian Railways South Western Railway zone that runs between Mysore Junction and Hazrat Nizamuddin via Miraj Junction in India. This train is also comes under the Swarna Jayanti Express trains series. It shares its rakes with 22681/22682 Mysore - Chennai Central Weekly Superfast Express

It operates as train number 12781 from Mysore Junction to Hazrat Nizamuddin and as train number 12782 in the reverse direction, serving the states of Karnataka, Maharashtra, Madhya Pradesh, Uttar Pradesh and Delhi.

== Coaches ==
The 12781 / 82 Swarna Jayanti Express and 22681/82 Chennai Superfast Express has

- 1 AC First Cum AC Two Tier
- 2 AC Two Tier
- 5 AC Three Tier
- 7 Sleeper Class
- 1 Pantry Car
- 2 General Unreserved
- 2 Luggage Cum Disabled Coach
- 1 End On Generator Car

As is customary with most train services in India, coach composition may be amended at the discretion of Indian Railways depending on demand.

== Service ==
The 12781 Mysore Junction–Hazrat Nizamuddin Swarna Jayanti Express covers the distance of 2,622 km (1,629 mi) in 45 hours 00 mins (58 km/h) and in 47 hours 05 mins as the 12782 Hazrat Nizamuddin– Mysore Junction Swarna Jayanti Express (56 km/h).

As the average speed of the train is higher than 55 km/h (34 mph), as per railway rules, its fare includes a Superfast surcharge.

== Routing ==
The 12781 / 82 Swarna Jayanti Express runs from Mysore Junction via Arsikere Junction, Kadur Junction, Hubli Junction, Miraj Junction, Pune Junction, Manmad Junction, Itarsi Junction, Jhansi Junction, Gwalior Junction, Agra Cantonment to Hazrat Nizamuddin.

== Traction ==
As the route is fully electrified, a Krishnarajapuram Loco Shed based WAP-7 electric locomotive pulls the train up to its destination.
