= Tatisilwai railway station =

Railway station in Jharkhand

TATISILWAI JUNCTION
- Indian Railways logo

General information
- Location: Ranchi, Ranchi district, Jharkhand; India
- Coordinates: 23°22′16″N 85°26′18″E
- Elevation: 612 metres (2,008 ft)
- System: Indian Railways station
- Line: Netaji S.C.Bose Gomoh–Hatia line
- Platforms: 3

Construction
- Structure type: At grade
- Parking: Available

Other information
- Status: Functional
- Station code: TIS
- Zone(s): South Eastern Railway
- Division(s): Ranchi
Location
- Location within India Location within Jharkhand
- Interactive map of Tatisiwai Junction

Tatisilwai Junction railway station, station code TIS, is the railway station serving the capital city of Ranchi in the Ranchi district in the Indian state of Jharkhand. Tatisilwai station belongs to the Ranchi division of the South Eastern Railway zone of the Indian Railways.

Ranchi has trains running frequently to Delhi and Kolkata. The city is a major railway hub and has four major stations: Ranchi Junction Hatia, Tatisilwai Junction and Namkon. Many important trains start from Ranchi Junction as well.

== Facilities ==
The major facilities available are waiting rooms, reservation counter, vehicle parking etc. The vehicles are allowed to enter the station premises. There is no tea stall, book stall, post or telegraphic office. Security personnel from the Government Railway Police (G.R.P.) and Railway Protection Force (RPF) are present for security.

=== Platforms ===
There are four platforms which are interconnected with foot overbridge (FOB).

== Nearest airports ==
The nearest airports to Tatisilwai station are:

1. Birsa Munda Airport, Ranchi 14 kilometres (8.7 mi)
2. Gaya Airport, Gaya 180 kilometres (110 mi)
3. Lok Nayak Jayaprakash Airport, Patna 279 kilometres (173 mi)
4. Netaji Subhash Chandra Bose International Airport, Kolkata 355 kilometres (221 mi)
