= Namkon railway station =

Railway station in Jharkhand

NAMKON

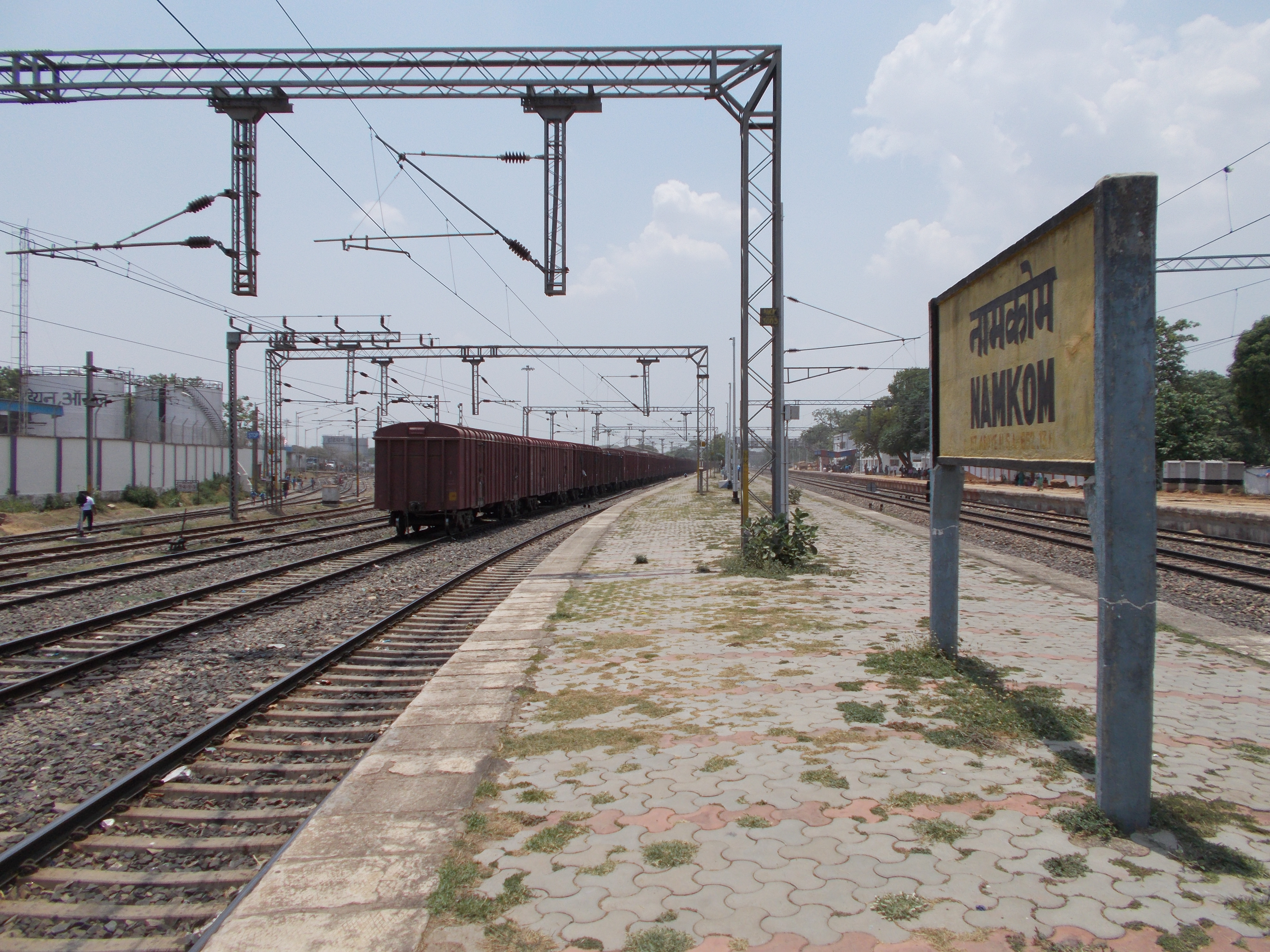

General information
- Location: Ranchi, Ranchi district, Jharkhand; India
- Coordinates: 23°21′6″N 85°22′34″E
- Elevation: 629 metres (2,064 ft)
- System: Indian Railways station
- Line: Netaji S.C.Bose Gomoh–Hatia line
- Platforms: 5

Construction
- Parking: Available

Other information
- Status: Functional
- Station code: NKM
- Zone(s): South Eastern Railway
- Division(s): Ranchi
Location

Namkom railway station, station code NKM, is the railway station serving the capital city of Ranchi in the Ranchi district in the Indian state of Jharkhand. Namkom station belongs to the Ranchi division of the South Eastern Railway zone of the Indian Railways.

Ranchi has trains running frequently to Delhi and Kolkata. The city is a major railway hub and has four major stations: Ranchi Junction, Hatia, Namkon, and Tatisilwai. Many important trains start from Ranchi Junction as well.

== Facilities ==
The major facilities available are waiting rooms, vehicle parking, etc. The vehicles are allowed to enter the station premises. Security personnel from the Government Railway Police are present for security.

=== Platforms ===
There are three platforms which are interconnected with foot overbridge (FOB).

== Trains ==
Several electrified local passenger trains also run from Ranchi to neighbouring destinations on frequent intervals. Many passenger and express trains serve Namkon Station.

== Nearest airport ==
The nearest airport to Namkon Station is Birsa Munda Airport, Ranchi 10 kilometres (6.2 mi)

== See also ==
- Ranchi
