= Jharkhand Swarna Jayanti Express =

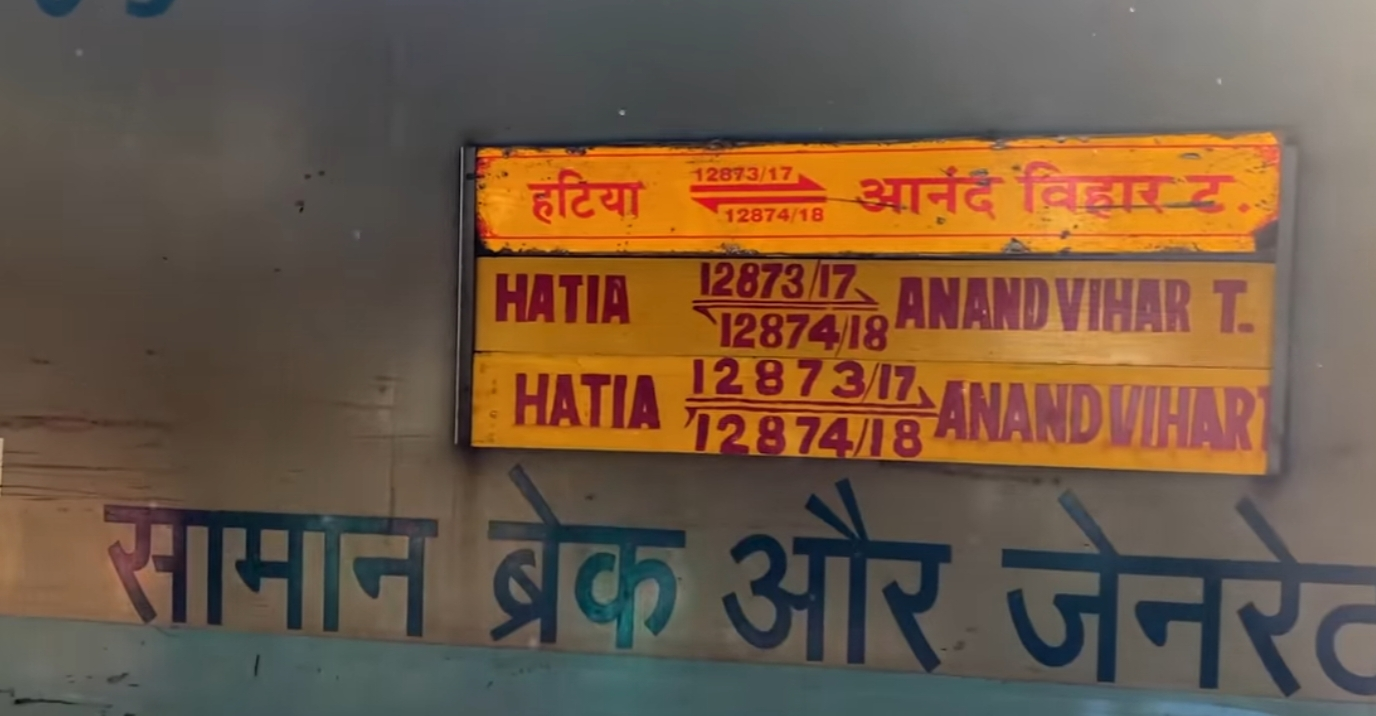

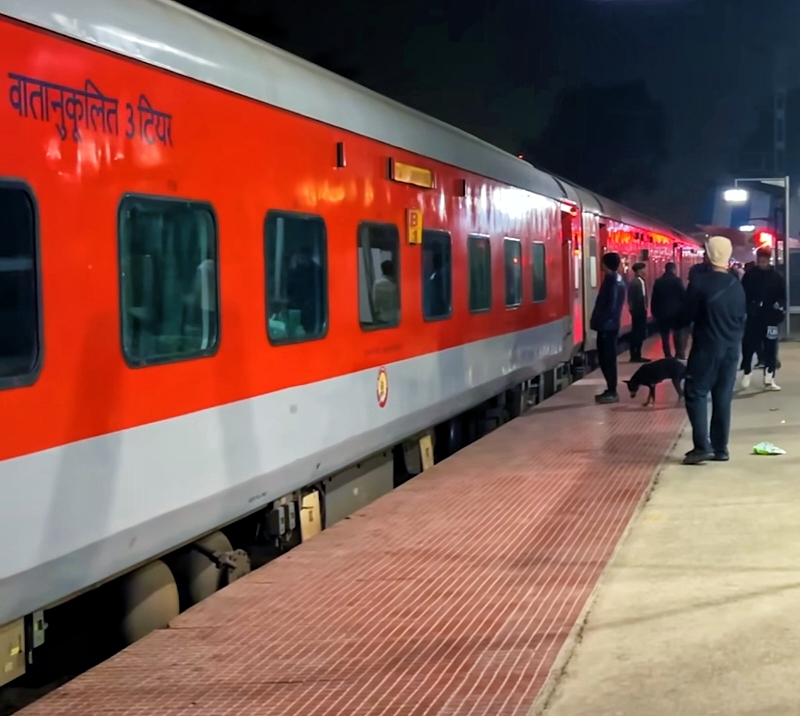
- Jharkhand Swarna Jayanti Express At Netaji Subhas Chandra Bose Gomoh railway station

Overview
- Service type: Swarna Jayanti Express
- First service: 1997; 29 years ago
- Current operator: South Eastern Railway zone

Route
- Termini: Hatia; Anand Vihar Terminal
- Stops: 18
- Distance travelled: 1,334 km (829 mi) (Approx.)
- Average journey time: 24 hours (Approx.)
- Service frequency: Tri-weekly
- Train number: 12817 / 18 / 73 / 74

On-board services
- Classes: AC 2 tier, AC 3 tier, Sleeper class, General Unreserved
- Seating arrangements: Yes
- Sleeping arrangements: Yes
- Catering facilities: Yes

Technical
- Rolling stock: LHB coach
- Track gauge: 1,676 mm (5 ft 6 in)
- Electrification: Partial
- Operating speed: 58.80 km/h (37 mph) (Approx.)

The 12817 / 18 / 73 / 74 Jharkhand Swarna Jayanti Express is a Superfast Express train belonging to Indian Railways – South Eastern Railway zone that runs between Hatia and Anand Vihar Terminal in India.

It operates as train number 12817 / 73 from Hatia to Anand Vihar Terminal and as train number 12818/ 74 in the reverse direction, serving the states of Jharkhand, Bihar, Uttar Pradesh and Delhi.

== Coaches ==
The 12817 / 18 / 73 / 74 Jharkhand Swarna Jayanti Express has 1 AC 2 tier, 3 AC 3 tier, 13 Sleeper class, 4 General Unreserved & 2 SLR (Seating cum Luggage Rake) coaches. In addition, they carry a pantry car.

As is customary with most train services in India, coach composition may be amended at the discretion of Indian Railways depending on demand.

== Service ==
The service covers a maximum distance of 1,325 kilometres (823 mi) in about 24 hours approximately at an average speed of 55 kilometres per hour (34 mph) between Hatia and Anand Vihar Terminal via Renukoot.

== Traction ==
It is hauled by Tatanagar–based WAP-7 or WAP-4 from end to end.
