= Swarna Jayanti Rajdhani Express =

Train in India

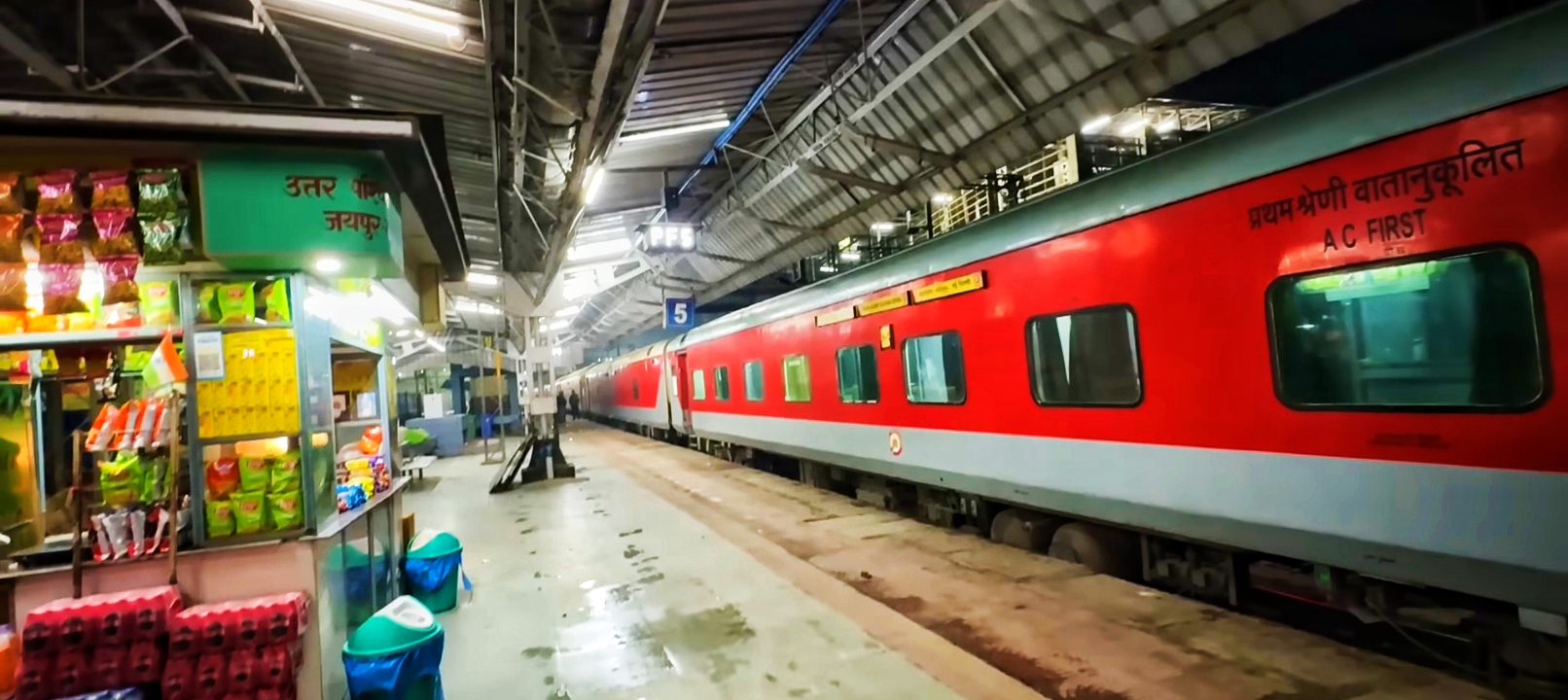
- Swarna Jayanti Rajdhani Express at Rewari Jn.

Overview
- Service type: Rajdhani Express , Swarna Jayanti Express
- Locale: Gujarat, Rajasthan, Haryana & Delhi
- First service: 1 January 1998; 28 years ago
- Current operator: Western Railway

Route
- Termini: Sabarmati (SBIB); New Delhi (NDLS)
- Stops: 8
- Distance travelled: 929 km (577 mi)
- Average journey time: 12 hrs 25 mins
- Service frequency: Daily
- Train number: 12957 / 12958
- Lines used: New Delhi–Ahmedabad main line, Jaipur–Ahmedabad main line, New Delhi–Jaipur main line

On-board services
- Classes: AC First Class, AC 2 Tier, AC 3 Tier
- Seating arrangements: No
- Sleeping arrangements: Yes
- Catering facilities: Available
- Observation facilities: Large windows
- Baggage facilities: Available
- Other facilities: Below the seats

Technical
- Rolling stock: LHB coach
- Track gauge: 1,676 mm (5 ft 6 in)
- Operating speed: 76 km/h (47 mph) average including halts.

The 12957 / 12958 Swarna Jayanti Rajdhani Express is a Rajdhani Express train of the Indian Railways. It is connecting Sabarmati (Ahmedabad) and New Delhi, a distance of the route is approximately 929 km (577 mi). The train was one of the Rajdhani Express trains to be introduced in the 20th century, making its inaugural run on 1 January 1998 after the erstwhile metre-gauge lines between Ahmedabad and Delhi through Gujarat, Rajasthan and Haryana were converted to broad gauge. Since it was introduced in the 50th year of India's independence, it was named "Swarna Jayanti" (Golden Jubilee) Rajdhani Express.

== Schedule ==
As of 21 March 2023, the Swarna Jayanti Rajdhani Express runs daily using the Jaipur–Ahmedabad line on Ahmedabad–Delhi main line. 12957 departs SBIB at 19:10 and arrives at NDLS at 07:30 the next day. 12958 departs NDLS at 19:55 and arrives at SBIB at 08:05 the next day, averaging approximately 77 km/h (48 mph) on both runs. In this sector, it is the fastest train between Ahmedabad and New Delhi. During its journey, the train passes through the Indian states of Gujarat, Rajasthan, Haryana and Delhi. The entire train route is electrified and only the section between Jagudan and Palanpur Junction is on double line as of February 2025.

== Time table ==
Station Code	Station name	Arrival	Departure
SBIB	Sabarmati Junction	——	18:45
MSH	Mahesana Junction	19:36	19:38
PNU	Palanpur Junction	20:40	20:42
ABR	Abu Road	21:20	21:25
FA	Falna	22:34	22:36
AII	Ajmer Junction	01:00	01:05
JP	Jaipur Junction	02:45	02:55
GGN	Gurgaon	06:24	06:26
DEC	Delhi Cantonment	06:40	06:42
NDLS	New Delhi	07:30	——

== Traction ==
Before the line was fully electrified, this premium train used to be pulled by a diesel locomotives like WDM-3A, WDM-3D and WDP-4 class. It is now hauled by a Vadodara Loco Shed-based WAP-7 electric locomotive on its entire journey.

== Gallery ==
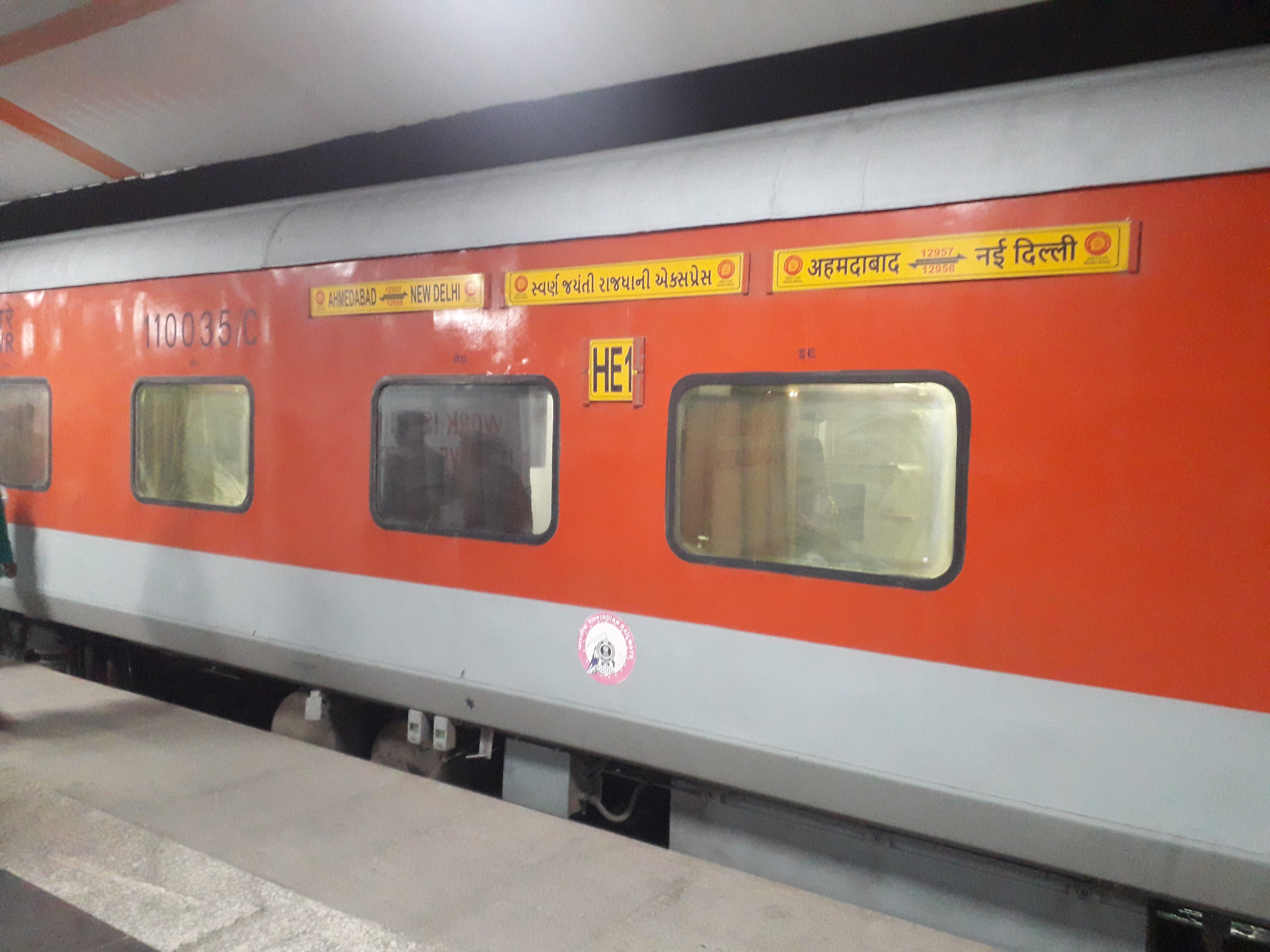
12958 Swarna Jayanti Rajdhani Express – AC 1st Class coach

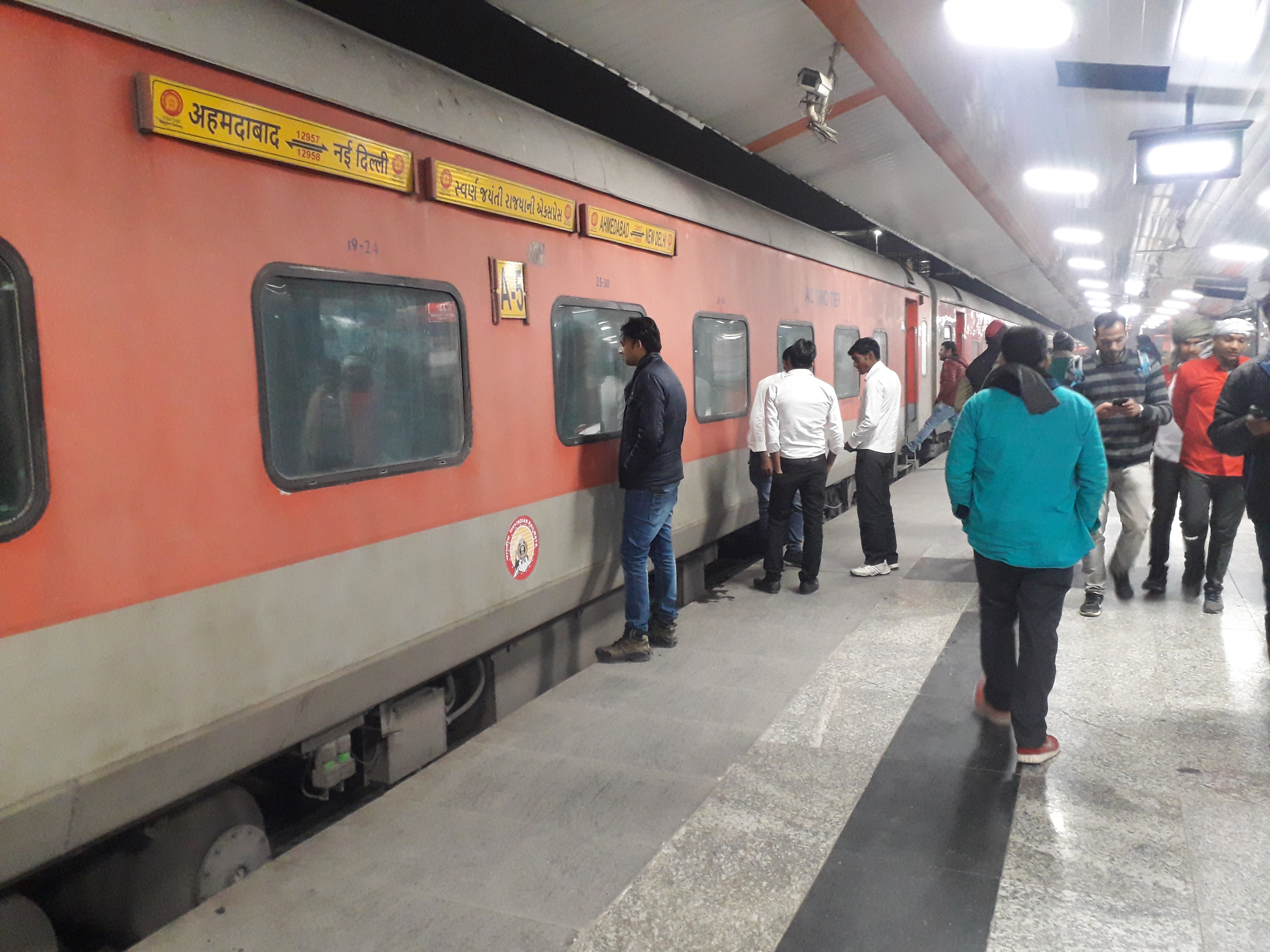
12958 Swarna Jayanti Rajdhani Express – AC 2 tier coach

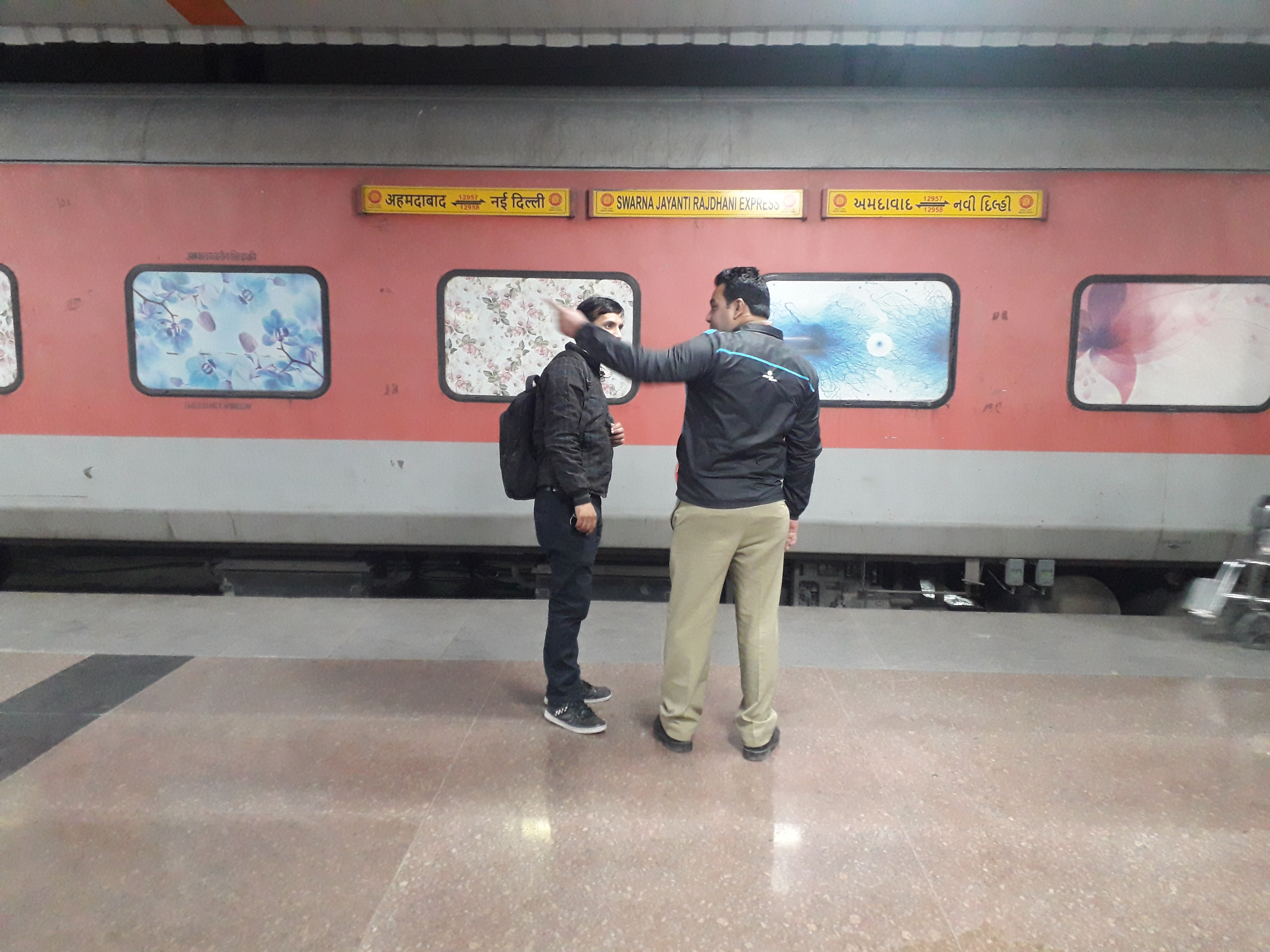
12958 Swarna Jayanti Rajdhani Express – Pantry car

=== Coach composition ===
Loco	1	2	3	4	5	6	7	8	9	10	11	12	13	14	15	16	17	18	19	20	21	22
	EOG	A1	A2	A3	A4	A5	H1	PC	BE1	B1	B2	B3	B4	B5	B6	B7	B8	B9	B10	B11	B12	EOG

== Other details ==
The train's rake is split into three classes of travel, AC 1st class (code: H/1A), AC 2 Tier (code: A/2A) and AC 3 Tier (code:B/3A). Usually, the train has one H/1A coach, four A/2A coaches and four to eight B/3A coaches. The train also has one or two End-on-Generation cars at either end. This train is popular with passengers and made a daily train in 2009. Previously, it used to run 5 days a week. As a Rajdhani Express, it is a Superfast train and gets the highest priority on its journey between Ahmedabad and New Delhi.

== See also ==
- Indian Railways
