= Swarna Jayanti Express =

Series of trains in India

Swarna Jayanti express trains are weekly Superfast trains introduced in 1997 for the 50th "Golden Jubilee" year of India's independence. It is the world's second largest rail system under one company. Five routes were originally available, but it has been expanded to eight routes. All trains go to Delhi. The routes are:

- Mysore Swarna Jayanti Express (via Bhopal Junction)
- Jharkhand Swarna Jayanti Express
- Jharkhand Swarna Jayanti Express (via Barkakana)
- Trivandrum Swarna Jayanti Express (via Kollam Junction, Ernakulam, Bhopal Junction)
- Visakhapatnam Swarna Jayanti Express (via Bhopal Junction)
- Sambalpur as Hirakud Swarna Jayanti Express, later shortened to Hirakud Express, is also introduced as part of the Swarna Jayanti Express series. Under the political pressure, the train extended further to Bhubaneswar and later to Visakhapatnam and Amritsar.
- Ahmedabad Swarna Jayanti Rajdhani Express is also part of the Swarna Jayanti Express series. This is the only Swarna Jayanti that has fully air conditioned coaches along with Rajdhani status.
- Millennium Express (via Bhopal Junction) to Ernakulam is part of this series.

== Livery ==
Back in the days of maroon-colored coaches and vacuum-braked stock, Mysore and Visakhapatnam Swarna Jayanti Expresses ran with a red, white, and blue livery. This continued until all coaches were made back into the air-braked blue coaches. Yet later 2019-2020 gets an LHB coach while Swarna Jayanti Rajdhani Express got already have LHB coach upgraded earlier (since glossy ICF Rajdhani are removed), these will pull by electric locomotives like WAP-4 , WAP-7 and WAP-5 for Swarna Jayanti Rajdhani it pulls by diesel locomotives like WDP-4 , WDM-3A and WDM-3D yet later was WAP-7 after route fully electrified
