= Hatia–Yesvantpur Superfast Express =

Train in India

Overview
- Service type: Superfast Express
- Status: Operating
- Locale: Jharkhand, Odisha, Andhra Pradesh, Tamil Nadu, Karnataka
- Current operator: South Eastern Railway zone

Route
- Termini: Hatia (HTE); Yesvantpur Junction (YPR)
- Stops: 22
- Distance travelled: 1,902 km (1,182 mi)
- Average journey time: 34h 35m
- Service frequency: Bi-weekly (Note: Runs two days in a week for every direction.)
- Train number: 12835/12836

On-board services
- Classes: AC 2 Tier, AC 3 Tier, Sleeper Class, Second Class(Unreserved)
- Seating arrangements: No
- Sleeping arrangements: Yes
- Catering facilities: On-board catering E-catering
- Observation facilities: LHB coach
- Entertainment facilities: No
- Baggage facilities: No
- Other facilities: Below the seats

Technical
- Rolling stock: 2
- Track gauge: 1,676 mm (5 ft 6 in)
- Electrification: Fully Electrified
- Operating speed: 59 km/h (37 mph), including halts
Route map
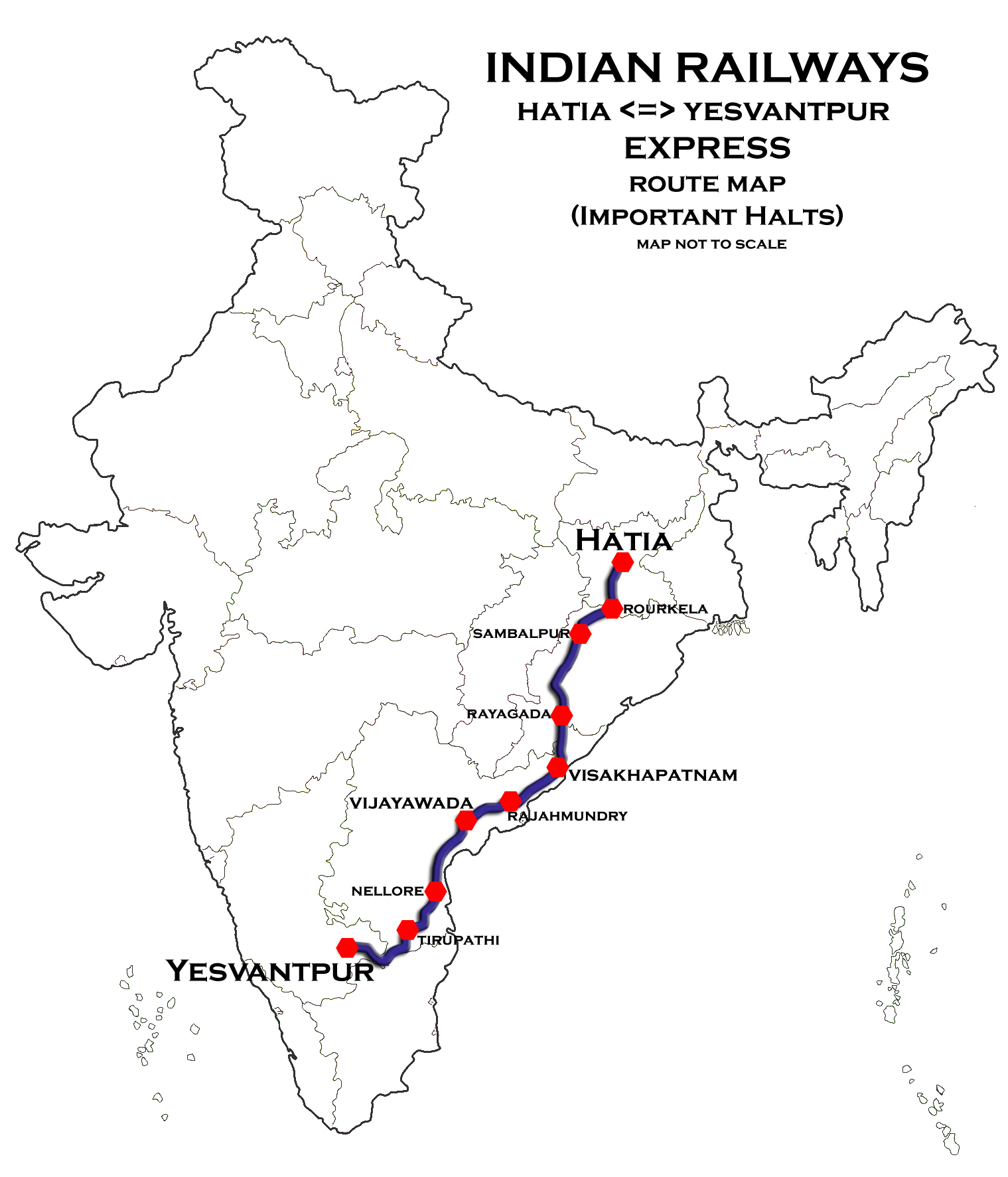

The 12835/12836 Hatia - Yesvantpur Superfast Express is a Superfast Express train that runs between Hatia and Yesvantpur

== Service ==
The 12835/Hatia–Yesvantpur SF Express has an average speed of 55 km/h and covers 1,902 km (1,182 mi) in 34h 35m. The 12836/Yesvantpur–Hatia SF Express has an average speed of 55 km/h and covers 1,902 km (1,182 mi) in 34h 35m.

== Route and halts ==
The important halts of the train are:

- Hatia
- Rourkela Junction
- Jharsuguda Junction
- Sambalpur Junction
- Titlagarh Junction
- Kesinga
- Rayagada
- Parvathipuram
- Vizianagaram Junction
- Visakhapatnam Junction
- Samalkot Junction
- Rajahmundry
- Vijayawada Junction
- Nellore
- Renigunta Junction
- Tirupati
- Katpadi Junction
- Krishnarajapuram
- Yesvantpur Junction

== Coach composition ==
The train has LHB coach with max speed of 160 kmph. The train consists of 23 coaches:

- 2 AC 2 Tier Coaches
- 6 AC 3 Tier Coaches
- 1 AC Pantry Car
- 7 Sleeper Coaches
- 5 Second Class (Unreserved)
- 2 Generator Car

== Direction reversal ==
The train reverses its direction once:

- Visakhapatnam Junction

== Running status ==
- 12835 – leaves Hatia every Sunday and Tuesday at 18:25 hrs IST and reach on 3day at SMVT Bangalore at 3:15 hrs IST.
- 12836 – leaves Yesvantpur Junction every Wednesday and Friday at 8:30 hrs IST and reaches Hatia the next day at 19:05 hrs IST.

== Traction ==
From Hatia to Visakhapatnam Junction Royapuram/Tatanagar Loco Shed Base WAP 4 and Visakhapatnam Junction to Yesvantpur Krishnarajapuram Loco Shed Base WAP 7 HOG until its end

== Rake-sharing ==
- Jharkhand Swarna Jayanthi Express
