= Rourkela Junction railway station =

Railway station in Odisha, India

Rourkela Junction
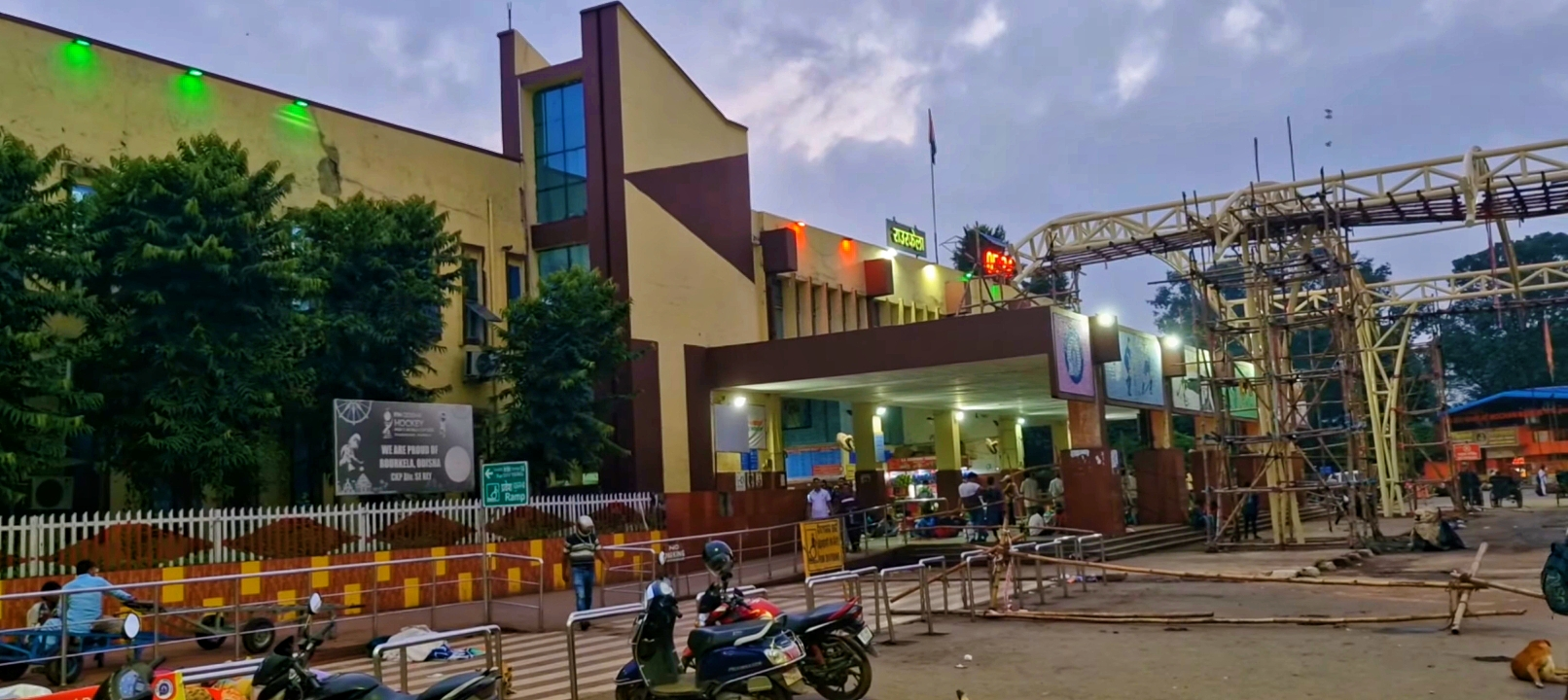
- Rourkela Junction Main Entrance

General information
- Location: Near New Bus Stand, Rourkela, Odisha; India
- Coordinates: 22°13′39″N 84°51′46″E
- Elevation: 219 m (719 ft)
- System: Indian Railways junction station
- Owner: Indian Railways
- Operator: South Eastern Railways
- Lines: Tatanagar–Bilaspur section of Howrah–Nagpur–Mumbai line, Rourkela–Ranchi section of Hatia–Rourkela line, Rourkela–Birmitrapur branch line
- Platforms: 7
- Tracks: 10 5 ft 6 in (1,676 mm) broad gauge
- Connections: Auto stand

Construction
- Structure type: At grade
- Parking: Yes
- Accessible: Available

Other information
- Status: Functioning
- Station code: ROU
- Zone(s): South Eastern Railway
- Division(s): Chakradharpur

History
- Opened: 1891; 135 years ago
- Electrified: 1961–62
- Former names: Bengal Nagpur Railway

Services
Preceding station	Indian Railways	Following station
Bondamunda towards ?	South Eastern Railway zone Tatanagar–Bilaspur section of Howrah–Nagpur–Mumbai line, Hatia–Rourkela line, Rourkela–Birmitrapur branch line	Panposh towards ?
Location
- Location within Odisha Location within India
- Interactive map

Rourkela Junction railway station (station code:- ROU) is a railway junction located in the north-western part of the Indian state of Odisha and serves Rourkela in Sundergarh district. Rourkela is the third-largest urban agglomeration in Odisha.

== History ==
Rourkela railway station came up with the opening of the Nagpur–Asansol main line of Bengal Nagpur Railway in 1891. It became a station on the crosscountry Howrah–Nagpur–Mumbai line in 1900. Rourkela was connected to Barsuan iron ore mines in 1960. In earlier days the railway station of Rourkela was within the village of Mahulpali. The railway station gained in importance with the setting up of India's first public sector steel plant at Rourkela in the nineteen fifties. It was electrified in 1961–62.

== Busy station ==
Rourkela railway station is amongst the top hundred booking stations of Indian Railway. 11 trains originate at Rourkela and 111 trains(including weeklies and bi-weeklies) pass through it. It is situated on the Kolkata–Mumbai South Eastern railway line which is a major route connecting the two metros of India. Rourkela is connected to Mumbai, Delhi, Kolkata, Asansol, Dhanbad, Ranchi, Bangalore, Chennai, Hyderabad, Pune, Ahmedabad, Bhubaneswar, Nagpur, Patna, Vishakhapatnam, Jamshedpur, Raipur, Cuttack, Puri, Berhampur, Sambalpur, Jammu & Kashmir and Ranchi.

== Bimlagarh–Talcher project ==
The 156 km (97 mi) long line connecting Bimlagarh on the Bondamunda–Barsuan branch line and Talcher on the Sambalpur–Talcher–Barang branch line, was sanctioned in 2004–05 and construction is in progress. This line when complete would reduce the distance between Rourkela and Bhubaneswar, the state capital, from 460 km (via Sambalpur) to 300 km.

== Electric Loco Shed, Rourkela ==
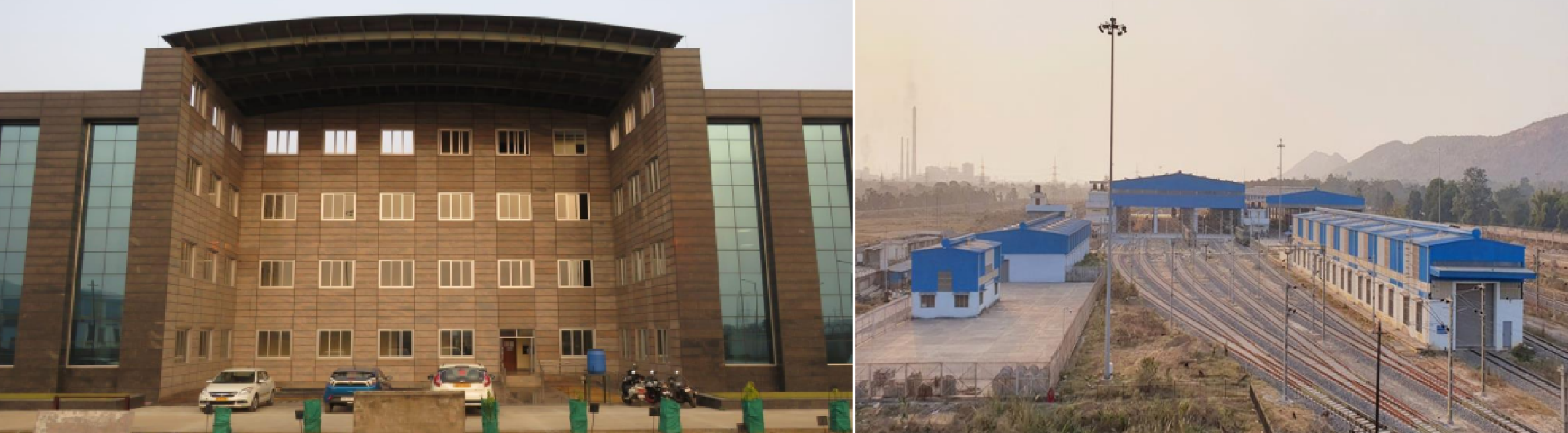
Rourkela Electric Locomotive Shed

Electric Loco Shed, Rourkela is the 3rd electric loco shed of Chakradharpur Division, South Eastern Railway. It has a holding capacity of 200 Electric locomotives.

Serial No.	Locomotive Class	Horsepower	Quantity
1.	WAG-9	6120	289
Total Locomotives Active as of February 2026			289
