= Hatia railway station =

Railway station in Jharkhand

HATIA

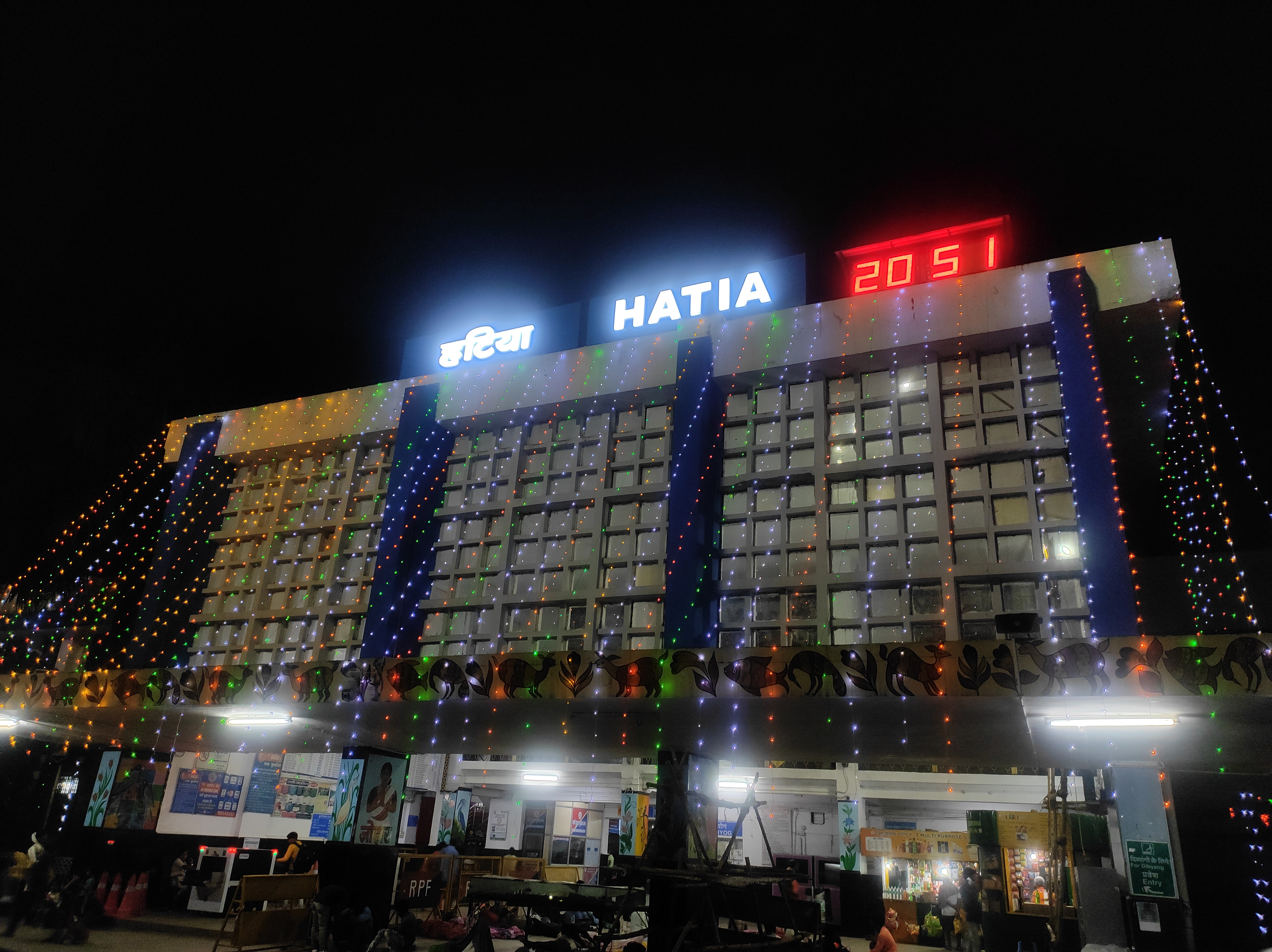
- Entrance of Hatia railway station in Night

General information
- Location: Hatia, Ranchi, Jharkhand; India
- Coordinates: 23°18′34″N 85°18′31″E
- Elevation: 657 metres (2,156 ft)
- System: Indian Railways station
- Owner: Indian Railways
- Operator: South Eastern Railway
- Lines: Netaji S.C.Bose Gomoh–Hatia main line and Hatia–Rourkela line
- Platforms: 3
- Tracks: 2

Construction
- Structure type: At grade
- Parking: Available

Other information
- Status: Functional
- Station code: HTE
- Zone(s): South Eastern Railway
- Division(s): Ranchi

History
- Opened: 1 November 1972; 53 years ago
- Electrified: 2001–2002; 24 years ago
Location
- Location within Jharkhand
- Interactive map

Hatia railway station, (station code: HTE) is the railway station serving the capital city of Ranchi in the Ranchi district in the Indian state of Jharkhand. Hatia Station belongs to the Ranchi division of the South Eastern Railway zone of the Indian Railways. Hatia railway station is connected to most of the major cities in India by the railway network. It is situated on Ranchi–Rourkela railway section.

Ranchi has trains running frequently to Delhi and Kolkata. The city is a major railway hub and has four major railway stations: Ranchi Junction, Hatia station, Tatisilwai and Namkom. Many important trains start from Ranchi Junction as well.

Hatia station plays as a major transportation hub for both passengers and goods, connecting Hatia with the rest of India. The total number of trains that pass through Hatia HTE is 18.

== Facilities ==
The major facilities available are waiting rooms, retiring room, computerised reservation facility, reservation counter, vehicle parking, etc. The vehicles are allowed to enter the station premises. There are refreshment rooms vegetarian and non vegetarian, tea stall, book stall, post and telegraphic office. Security personnel from the Government Railway police (GRP) and Railway Protection Force (RPF) are present for security. The Railway medical unit providing health facilities is located near Hatia station. Hatia Station is located close to the bus terminal and domestic airport providing transport to important destinations of Jharkhand.

== Platforms ==
The three platforms are interconnected with foot overbridges (FOB).

== Trains ==
Hatia is a major railway station in Ranchi division of the South Eastern Railway and a terminal station for several trains. Several electrified as well as diesel local, M/E, SF, GR passenger trains also run from Hatia / Ranchi to different destinations of the country on frequent intervals.

Many passenger and express trains serve Hatia Station.

== Connectivity ==
- Hatia railway station to Ranchi Airport is around 4 km.
- Hatia railway station to Ranchi Junction are approximately 7 km apart.
- Hatia railway station to Tatisilwai is 18 km away and is usually completed in 34 minutes.
- Hatia railway station and Namkom are 11 km apart, with an average travel time of 1 hour and 12 minutes.
- Hatia railway junction is 354 km from Patna

== Nearest airports ==
The nearest airports to Hatia station are:

- Birsa Munda Airport, Ranchi 1 kilometre (0.62 mi)
- Gaya Airport, Gaya 183 kilometres (114 mi)
- Jay Prakash Narayan Airport, Patna 285 kilometres (177 mi)
- Netaji Subhas Chandra Bose International Airport, Kolkata 368 kilometres (229 mi)
