= Harpalus cardoni =

Scientific classification
- Kingdom: Animalia
- Phylum: Arthropoda
- Class: Insecta
- Order: Coleoptera
- Suborder: Adephaga
- Family: Carabidae
- Genus: Harpalus
- Species: H. cardoni

Binomial name
- Harpalus cardoni Antoine, 1922

Species of beetle

Harpalus cardoni is a species of ground beetle in the subfamily Harpalinae. It was described by Antoine in 1922 based on a specimen collected by Louis Cardon.
