= Nag Mundari (Unicode block) =

- Range: U+1E4D0..U+1E4FF (48 code points)
- Plane: SMP
- Scripts: Nag Mundari
- Assigned: 42 code points
- Unused: 6 reserved code points

Unicode version history
- 15.0 (2022): 42 (+42)

Unicode documentation
- Code chart ∣ Web page

Nag Mundari is a Unicode block containing the letters for writing the Mundari language. Nag Mundari is encoded as a unicameral alphabet. The Nag Mundari block contains 27 letters plus five diacritics and ten digits.

== Block ==
Nag Mundari^{[1]}^{[2]} Official Unicode Consortium code chart (PDF)
	0	1	2	3	4	5	6	7	8	9	A	B	C	D	E	F
U+1E4Dx	𞓐	𞓑	𞓒	𞓓	𞓔	𞓕	𞓖	𞓗	𞓘	𞓙	𞓚	𞓛	𞓜	𞓝	𞓞	𞓟
U+1E4Ex	𞓠	𞓡	𞓢	𞓣	𞓤	𞓥	𞓦	𞓧	𞓨	𞓩	𞓪	𞓫	𞓬	𞓭	𞓮	𞓯
U+1E4Fx	𞓰	𞓱	𞓲	𞓳	𞓴	𞓵	𞓶	𞓷	𞓸	𞓹						
Notes: 1. As of Unicode version 16.0; 2. Grey areas indicate non-assigned code points

== History ==
The following Unicode-related documents record the purpose and process of defining specific characters in the Nag Mundari block:

Version	Final code points (Note: Proposed code points and characters names may differ from final code points and names)	Count	L2 ID	Document
15.0	U+1E4D0..1E4F9	42	L2/21-031R	Wolf-Sonkin, Lawrence; Mandal, Biswajit (2021-04-23), Proposal to Encode the Mundari Bani Script
15.0	U+1E4D0..1E4F9	42	L2/21-016R	Anderson, Deborah; Whistler, Ken; Pournader, Roozbeh; Moore, Lisa; Liang, Hai (2021-01-14), "13. Mundari Bani", Recommendations to UTC #166 January 2021 on Script Proposals
15.0	U+1E4D0..1E4F9	42	L2/21-073	Anderson, Deborah; Whistler, Ken; Pournader, Roozbeh; Moore, Lisa; Liang, Hai (2021-04-23), "7. Nag Mundari", Recommendations to UTC #167 April 2021 on Script Proposals
15.0	U+1E4D0..1E4F9	42	L2/21-066	Moore, Lisa (2021-05-05), "Consensus 167-C6", UTC #167 Minutes
