= Louis Cardon =

Belgian Jesuit missionary (1857–1946)

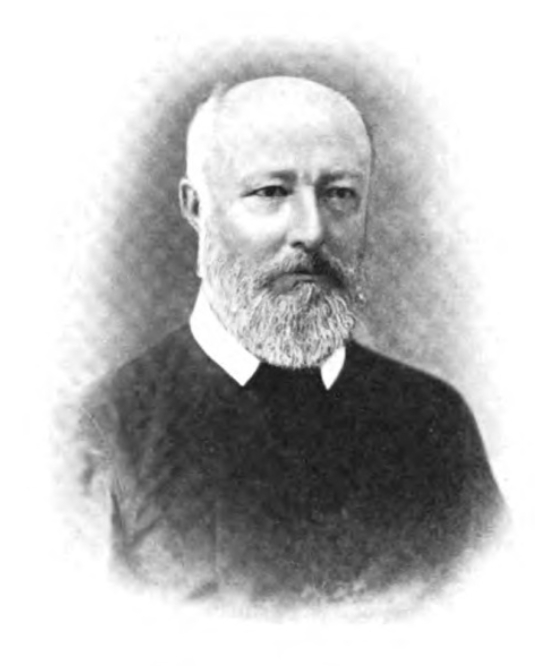
c. 1912

Father Louis Cardon (25 December 1857 – 11 February 1946) was a Belgian Jesuit missionary who worked among the Chota Nagpur tribes in current day Jharkhand in India. He studied the local culture, collected plants and insects and contributed illustrations to the Encyclopaedia Mundarica. The beetle species Cicindela cardoni and Adoretus cardoni are among the many named in his honour.

== Life and work ==
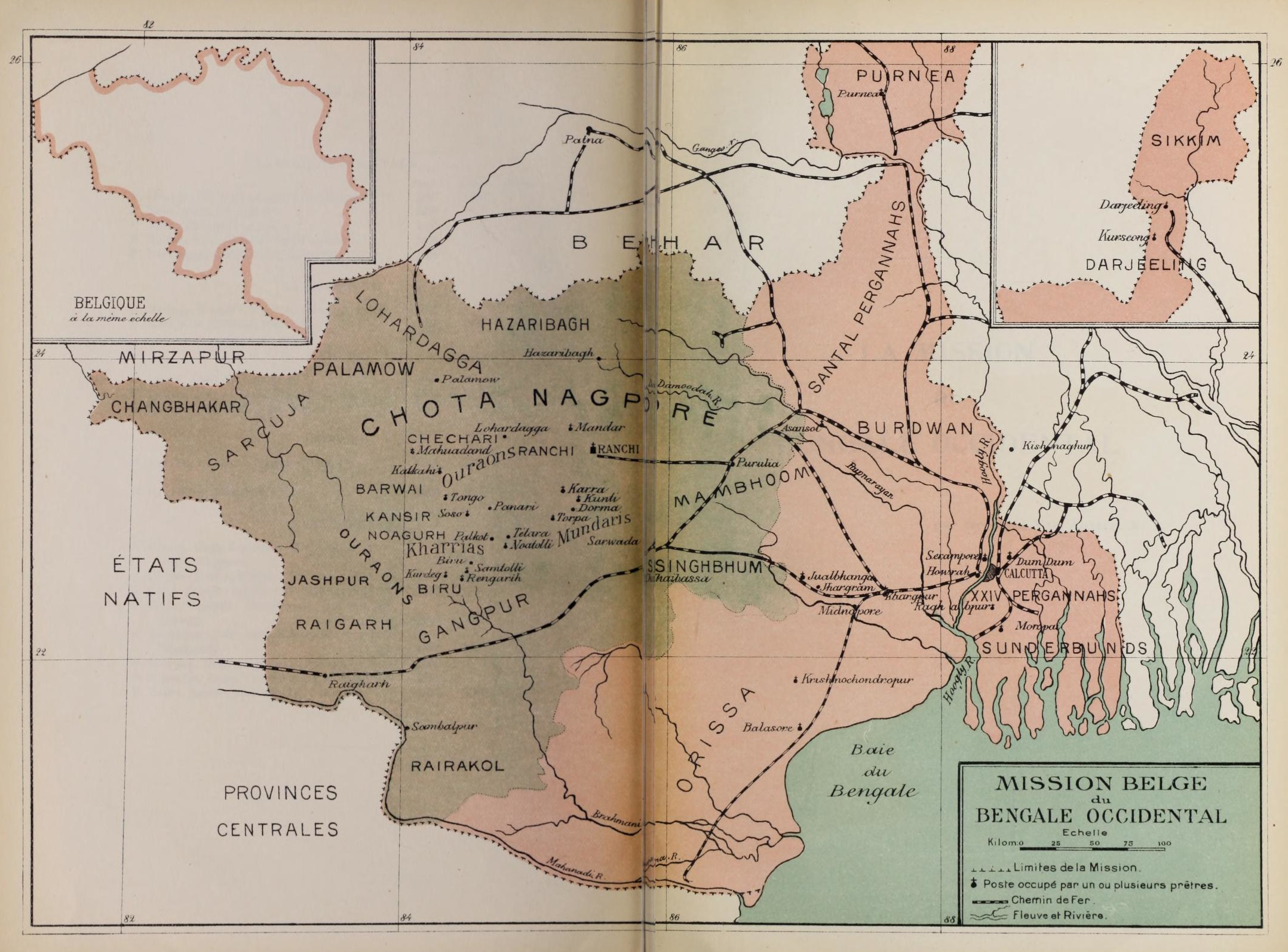
Map showing areas of work

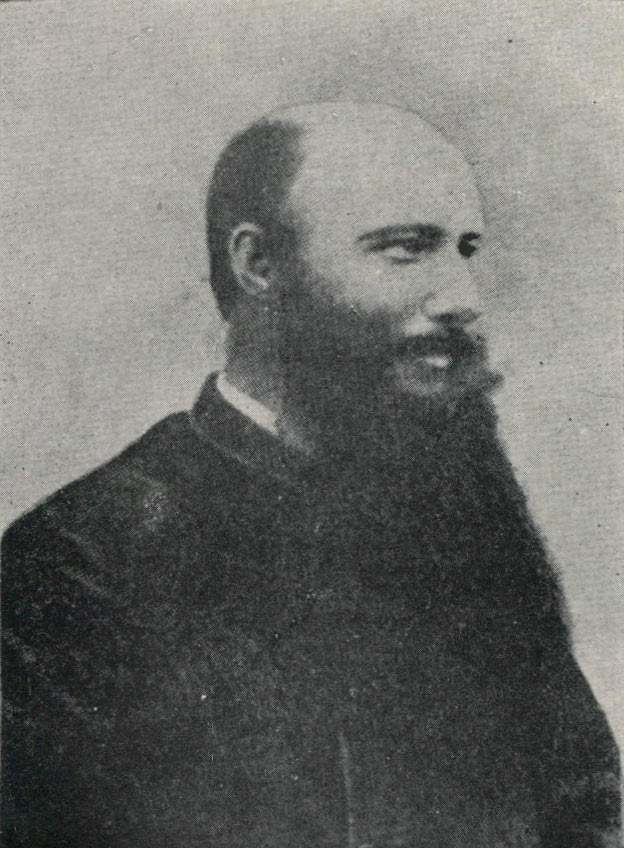
Cardon in later life

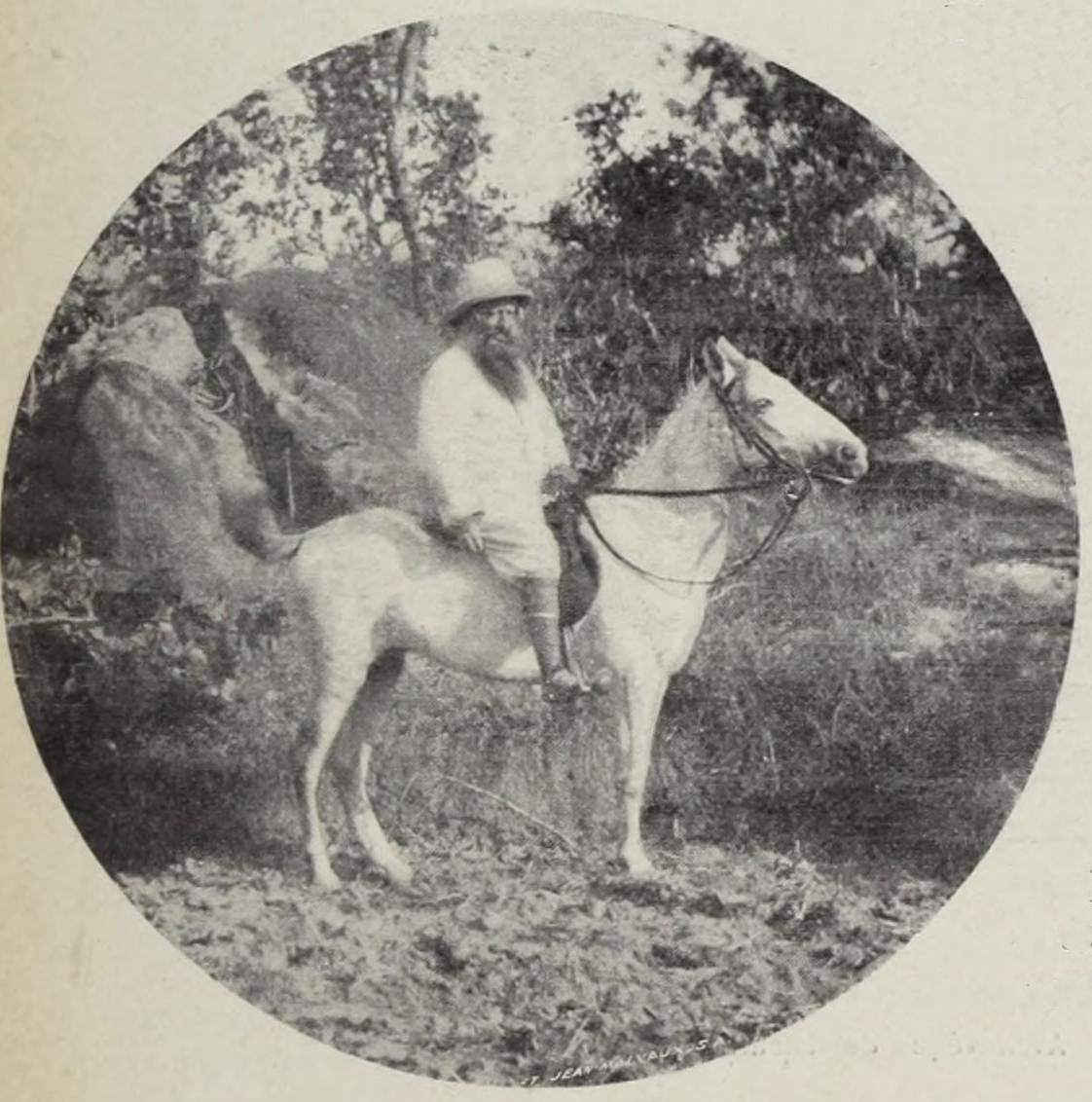
On horseback in Rengari, c. 1906

Cardon was born in Néchin, Maurage (Hainaut) and entered the Society of Jesus on 25 October 1876. He was sent to India as part of a Belgian mission along with Constant Lievens and reached India on 25 November 1884. He was initially trained at the Asansol mission and in January 1889 he was assigned to Tetara village west of Konbir-Noatoli. He acquired with permission from Mission director Constant Lievens, a white horse that he named Bijou. He accompanied Count Henry le Grille who was visiting Torpa and then he stayed at Karra as a guest of Father Walter Frencken. His initial areas of work included Noatoli, Gumla, Soso, Majhatoli as well as Barway, Chechari and Biru. In 1889 the zamindars and police plotted against the missionaries, claiming that they were inciting a revolt. The acting commissioners of Lohardaga, Renny and Lillington met Cardon and threatened the missionary of actions similar to that taken by Bismarck on German Jesuits. They also imprisoned several people claimed as rebels. The Mission appealed in Calcutta in 1890 and prisoners were released. Man Mohan Ghosh was the lawyer for their case.

The crisis was settled towards the end of 1890. In December 1890, Lievens and Cardon baptized 3000 people in two days. Some of them later converted to Lutheranism when some other missionaries passed through the area. In 1896-97 there was a severe famine and the missionaries were involved in relief work. In 1908, three Ursuline Sisters of Tildont (Belgium) came to Rengarih and they established a school in 1909. Cardon became first Superior in January 1909 at Regnarih. Cardon supported the Catholic Co-operative Credit Society started by Jan-Baptist Hoffmann. In 1917 Cardon moved to Samtoli to replace Henry Floor who moved to France to serve in the Labour Corps. On February 7, 1926 he celebrated the golden jubilee of his service. In later life he had a horse named Raja and Father Cardon was noted for his horsemanship. He was involved in the establishment of the Biru Mission and extended its activities to Gangpur. He worked at various times at Tetra, Torpa, Kurdeg, Barway (=Barwe), Rengarih and several other places.

Cardon also travelled to the northeast of India (Kurseong, possibly during summers) and collected plants (particularly orchids) and insects in these areas and sent them to collectors in Europe, some sold for money. Several new species were described based on these specimens including the tiger beetle Cicindela cardoni which was named his honour by the French entomologist Edmond Jean-Baptiste Fleutiaux. Numerous other species were also named after him including Octocryptus cardoni, Verania cardoni, Heteropaussus cardonii, Sumnius cardoni, Harpalus cardoni, Anegleis cardoni, Orectochilus cardoni, Cybister cardoni, Lebia cardoni, Merista cardoni, Anagylmma cardoni, Symmorphocerus cardoni, Aulis cardoni, Caelophora cardoni, Pallodes cardoni, Stenelmis cardoni, Symmophocerus cardoni and Idgia cardoni. Sir David Prain examined the orchids collected by Cardon and described Dendrobium regium from them. He also named a species of Microstylis as M. cardonii, however this is now a junior synonym. He collaborated with Father Hoffmann on producing the Encyclopaedia Mundarica for which he contributed illustrations. He also studied the culture of the Munda people, recording plant foods used during famines and assisted Walter Ruben in his study of the Asurs in 1939.

Cardon was awarded a second class Kaiser-i-Hind medal by the British government represented by A.P. Middleton, commissioner of Chotanagpur, on 15 December 1936. In his later years he spent most of his time in gardening and farming. He suffered from a stroke on the night of February 10, 1946 and died the next evening at Samtoli, Simdega.
