= Mundari Bani =

Alphabetic script for Munda people

Mundari Bani 𞓧𞓟𞓨𞓜𞓕𞓣𞓚 𞓗𞓕𞓨𞓚
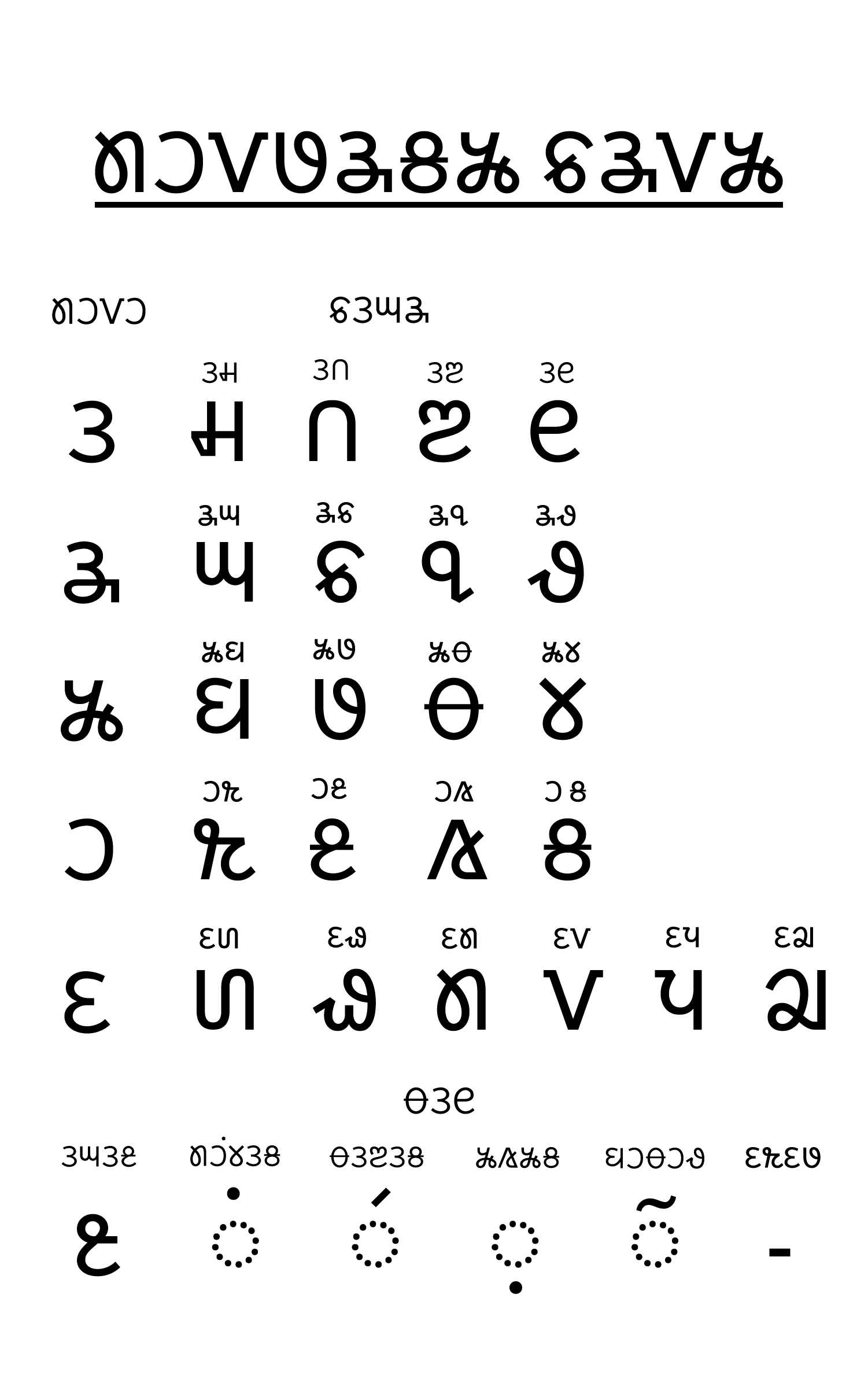
- Mundari Bani Alphabet
- Script type: Alphabet
- Creator: Rohidas Singh Nag
- Created: 1982
- Period: 1982 to present
- Direction: Left to Right
- Region: India: Odisha; Jharkhand; West Bengal; Assam
- Languages: Mundari

Related scripts
- Parent systems: Original invention: Mundari Bani

ISO 15924
- ISO 15924: Nagm (295), Nag Mundari

Unicode
- Unicode alias: Nag Mundari
- Unicode range: U+1E4D0–U+1E4FF Nag Mundari

Mundari Bani (Mundari: 𞓧𞓟𞓨𞓜𞓕𞓣𞓚 𞓗𞓕𞓨𞓚, romanized: Mundari Bani) also known as Nag Mundari (Mundari: 𞓨𞓕𞓦 𞓧𞓟𞓨𞓜𞓕𞓣𞓚, romanized: Nag Mundari) and Mundari Bani Hisir, or the Mundari alphabet, is the writing system created for the Mundari language, spoken in eastern India. Mundari is an Austroasiatic language. Mundari Bani has 27 letters and five diacritics, the forms of which are intended to evoke natural shapes. The script is written from left to right.

Community elder and author Rohidas Singh Nag invented and published in late 1980 the alphabetic writing system Mundari Bani, which has seen limited but increasing use in literature, education, and computing.

== History ==
Rohidas Singh Nag started designing the initial characters of Mundari bani in 1949 while in grade school, which he wrote on the walls using clay. By 1953 he had finished a set of 35 characters. He further simplified the alphabet in 1980 by reducing it to 27 alphabetical characters. In 2008 Bharat Munda Samaj, Mundari Samaj Sanwar Jamda and Nag reformed the script in styling and adding glyphs. Since then, fonts were developed using this standard.

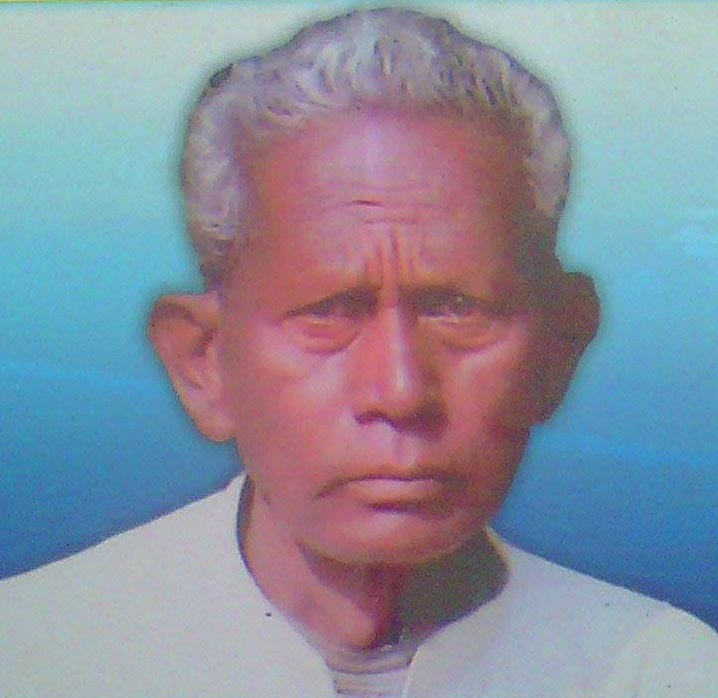
Rohidas Singh Nag, creator of Mundari Bani script

Nag presented the alphabet in the 1980s to then-Chief Minister of Odisha Janaki Ballabh Patnaik and submitted a memorandum to recognize the Munda language constitutionally. Nag along with others submitted a memorandum to the then president of India in 1999 appealing again for the constitutional recognition. "Mundari Samaj Sanwar Jamda", a social organisation of the Munda community based in Poda Astia, Mayurbhanj has been demanding to incorporate the Munda language in the Eighth Schedule to the Constitution of India, to air Munda language through All India Radio, and establish a Munda language department at North Odisha University for higher studies on the basis of the writing system and literature. The writing system has seen limited but increasing use in literature, education, and computing.

== Letters ==
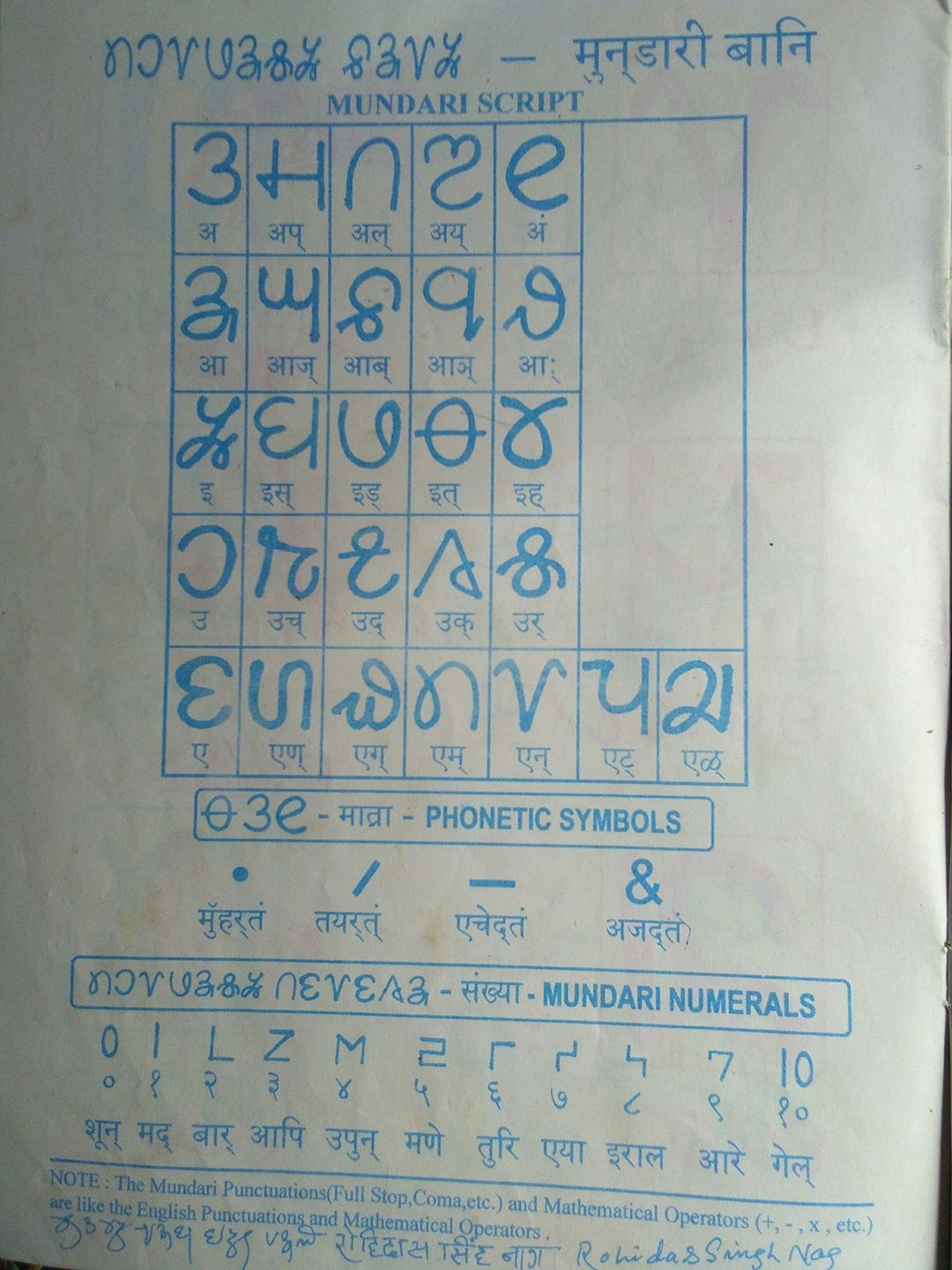
A Primer showing typical didactic presentation of Mundari Bani. The first section consists of five rows, each headed by a vowel, with the first letter of their names matching the vowel of the row. The second section is a collection of diacritics (Tong) that play a secondary phonetic role.

Unlike the Brahmic abugidas (such as Devanagari, Bengali, or Odia), Mundari Bani is a true alphabet. The script is unicameral, designed to accommodate the unique phonetic features of Austroasiatic Munda languages, such as checked consonants and heavy vowel sequences, while using diacritics and digraphs to adapt to Indo-Aryan loanwords.

Since the 2008 edits, it consists of 27 distinct letters and 5 diacritical marks, written from left to right, where consonants do not possess an inherent vowel. Their names follow traditional naming schemes.

Mundari Alphabet ( 𞓗𞓕𞓨𞓚 𞓧𞓟𞓨𞓡𞓚 Bani Mundi )
Letter	Mundari Name	Romanised Name	Transliteration					IPA
Letter	Mundari Name	Romanised Name	ALA-LC	Zide (Note: This is for Santali, Mundari's sister language with similar phonemes.)	Deva.	Beng.	Odia	IPA
𞓐	𞓐	O	o	ọ	ओ	ও	ଓ	/ɔ/
𞓑	𞓐𞓑	OP	p	p	प	প	ପ୍	/p/
𞓒	𞓐𞓒	OL	l	l	ल	ল	ଲ୍	/l/
𞓓	𞓐𞓓	OY	y	y	य	য / য়	ଯ / ୟ	/j/
𞓔	𞓐𞓔	ONG	ng	ṅ	ङ	ঙ	ଙ	/ŋ/
𞓕	𞓕	A	ā	a	अ / आ	অ / আ	ଅ / ଆ	/a/
𞓖	𞓕𞓖	AJ	j	cʼ	ज	জ	ଜ୍	/d͡ʑ/ , /ɟ/
𞓗	𞓕𞓗	AB	b	pʼ	ब	ব	ବ୍	/pʼ/ , /b/
𞓘	𞓕𞓘	ANY	ny	ñ	ञ	ঞ	ଞ୍	/ɲ/
𞓙	𞓕𞓙	AH	ḥ	h	ः	ঃ	ଃ	/ʔ/ , /h/
𞓚	𞓚	I	i	i	इ / ई	ই / ঈ	ଇ / ଈ	/i/
𞓛	𞓚𞓛	IS	s	s	स	স	ସ୍	/s̪/
𞓜	𞓚𞓜	IDD	ḍ	ḍ	ड	ড	ଡ୍	/ɖ/
𞓝	𞓚𞓝	IT	t	t	त	ত	ତ୍	/t̪/
𞓞	𞓚𞓞	IH	h	(C)h	ह	হ	ହ୍	/ʰ/ , /h/
𞓟	𞓟	U	u	u	उ / ऊ	উ / ঊ	ଉ / ଊ	/u/
𞓠	𞓟𞓠	UC	ch	c	च	চ	ଚ୍	/t͡ʃ/
𞓡	𞓟𞓡	UD	d	tʼ	द	দ	ଦ୍	/tʼ/, /d̪/
𞓢	𞓟𞓢	UK	k	k	क	ক	କ୍	/k/
𞓣	𞓟𞓣	UR	r	r	र	র	ର୍	/r/
𞓤	𞓤	E	e	e	ए	এ	ଏ	/e/
𞓥	𞓤𞓥	ENN	ṇ	ṇ	ण	ণ	ଣ୍	/ɳ/
𞓦	𞓤𞓦	EG	g	kʼ	ग	গ	ଗ୍	/g/
𞓧	𞓤𞓧	EM	m	m	म	ম	ମ୍	/m/
𞓨	𞓤𞓨	EN	n	n	न	ন	ନ୍	/n/
𞓩	𞓤𞓩	ETT	ṭ	ṭ	ट	ট	ଟ୍	/ʈ/
𞓪	𞓤𞓪	ELL	ṛ / ḷ	ḷ	ड़ / ळ	ড়	ଡ଼ / ଳ	/ɽ/, /ɭ/

Mundari Diacritics ( 𞓝𞓐𞓔 Toṅ/Tong )
Letter	Mundari Name	Romanised Name	Transliteration			Function/IPA
Letter	Mundari Name	Romanised Name	Deva.	Beng.	Odia	Function/IPA
𞓫	𞓐𞓖𞓐𞓡	OJOD	्	্‌	୍	Modifies preceding consonant; check/gemination
◌𞓬	𞓧𞓟𞓬𞓞𞓐𞓣	MUHOR	ँ / ं	্ঁ / ং	ଁ / ଂ	Vowel Nasalization /◌̃/
◌𞓭	𞓝𞓐𞓓𞓐𞓣	TOYOR	◌ा	◌া	◌ା	Vowel Lengthener /ː/
◌𞓮	𞓚𞓢𞓚𞓣	IKIR	◌्व	◌্ব	◌୍ୱ	Labialization /ʷ/
◌𞓯	𞓛𞓟𞓝𞓟𞓙	SUTUH	़	়	଼	Nukta (for non-native sounds)

== Vowels ==
Vowels are called Munu Bani (Mundari: 𞓧𞓟𞓨𞓟 𞓗𞓕𞓨𞓚, romanized: Munu Bani) in Mundari. All vowels have long and short as well as nasalised allophones, but neither length nor nasality is contrastive. All vowels in open monosyllables are quantitatively longer than those in closed syllables. The following table shows the five base vowel phonemes:

Mundari Vowel Inventory (𞓧𞓟𞓨𞓟 𞓗𞓕𞓨𞓚 Munu Bani)
	Short			Long		
	Front	Central	Back	Front	Central	Back
Close	/i/ 𞓚 i		/u/ 𞓟 u	/iː/ 𞓚𞓭 ī		/uː/ 𞓟𞓭 ū
Mid	/e/𞓤 e		/o/ 𞓐 o	/eː/ 𞓤𞓭 ē		/oː/ 𞓐𞓭 ō
Open		/a/ 𞓕 a			/aː/ 𞓕𞓭 ā	

In native Mundari grammar, vowels are categorised by phonetic length into short and long vowels. The five base vowel alphabets of the Mundari Bani script are:

Mundari Base Vowels 𞓡𞓚𞓔𞓦𞓕𞓤𞓙 𞓧𞓟𞓨𞓟 𞓗𞓕𞓨𞓚 Dingaeḥ Munu Bani
𞓐 o IPA: /oɔ/	𞓕 a IPA: /a/	𞓚 i IPA: /i/	𞓟 u IPA: /u/	𞓤 e IPA: /e/

Unlike Brahmic scripts, Mundari Bani lacks independent letters for long vowels. Instead, long vowels are formed by attaching the TOYOR (◌𞓭) diacritic to a base vowel, but not all long vowels are demarcated, depending upon the scribe.

- 𞓕 (/a/) + ◌𞓭 → 𞓕𞓭 (/aː/)
- Example 1: Mundari: 𞓐𞓪𞓕𞓭, IPA: /oɽ.aː/ , Translation: House
- Example 2: Mundari: 𞓗𞓚𞓭𞓔, IPA: /biːŋ/ , Translation: Snake

Mundari Long Vowels 𞓖𞓚𞓒𞓚𞓔 𞓧𞓟𞓨𞓟 𞓗𞓕𞓨𞓚 Jiliṅ Munu Bani
𞓐𞓭 ō IPA: /oː/	𞓕𞓭 ā IPA: /aː/	𞓚𞓭 ī IPA: /iː/	𞓟𞓭 ū IPA: /uː/	𞓤𞓭 ē IPA: /eː/

=== Loan Words ===
To denote the signature /O/ sound in the neighbouring Odia/Bengali language, the script uses 𞓐 (/o/) with the SUTUH (◌𞓯) diacritic.

𞓐𞓯
O
IPA: /O/

=== Nasalisation ===
Nasalisation in Mundari is represented by the MUHOR (◌𞓬) diacritic. It attaches to the primary vowels or the final vowel in a cluster.

- 𞓕 (/a/) + ◌𞓬 → 𞓕𞓬 (/ã/)
- Example 1: Mundari: 𞓝𞓟𞓕𞓬, IPA: /t̪uãː/ , Translation: Milk/Breast
- Example 2: Mundari: 𞓧𞓟𞓬 , IPA: /mũː/ , Translation: Nose

Vowels preceding or following nasal phonemes like /ŋ/, /ɲ/, /ṇ/, /ɳ/ and /m/ are also nasalised. Native writers do not usually add the MUHOR (◌𞓬) in these cases because, unlike the ONG (𞓔) letter, which represents the nasal consonant /ŋ/, the MUHOR indicates the nasalisation of the vowel itself, crucial for distinguishing word pairs in native Munda vocabulary.

- 𞓧 (/m/) + 𞓕 (/a/) → 𞓧𞓕 (/mã/)

Additionally, those following /ɟ/ are also nasalised.

- 𞓖 (/ɟ/) + 𞓕 (/a/) → 𞓖𞓕 (/ɟã/)

=== Diphthongs ===
Mundari frequently uses sequences where two or three vowels follow each other without an intervening consonant. Unlike English diphthongs, they are treated as distinct syllables. Some common clusters are:

𞓕𞓚 ai IPA: /ai/	𞓕𞓐 ao IPA: /ao/	𞓚𞓕 ia IPA: /ia/	𞓤𞓕 ea IPA: /ea/	𞓐𞓚 oi IPA: /oi/	𞓐𞓯𞓟 ou IPA: /Ou/ (Note: This cluster is a loan word from the Odia / Bengali languages, hence the use of the SUTUH diacritic.)

=== Vowel Absence ===
The absence of vowel phonemes in consonant clusters or after word-end consonants is marked by the absence of vowel letters. There is no halant to indicate a vowel negation as in Brahmic abugidas.

- Example 1: Mundari: 𞓧𞓟𞓨𞓜𞓕𞓣𞓚, IPA: /Muɳɖārī/ , Translation: Mundari (lang.)
- Example 2: Mundari: 𞓗𞓟𞓒𞓟𞓔, IPA: /buluŋ/ , Translation: Salt

== Consonants ==
=== Basic Consonants ===
In Mundari, consonants are called Boja Bani (Mundari: 𞓗𞓐𞓖𞓕 𞓗𞓕𞓨𞓚, romanized: Boja Bani). Mundari Bani represents consonants using 22 basic letters, plus one diacritic. They are organised into five clusters, each led by a primary vowel. The first letter of the consonant's name matches the primary vowel. These basic letters are:

Mundari consonants (𞓗𞓐𞓖𞓕 𞓗𞓕𞓨𞓚 Boja Bani)
𞓐 o IPA: /o/	𞓐𞓑 𞓑 p IPA: /p/	𞓐𞓒 𞓒 l IPA: /l/	𞓐𞓓 𞓓 y IPA: /j/	𞓐𞓔 𞓔 ṅ IPA: /ŋ/		
𞓕 a IPA: /a/	𞓕𞓖 𞓖 j IPA: /d͡ʑ/	𞓕𞓗 𞓗 b IPA: /b/	𞓕𞓘 𞓘 ñ IPA: /ɲ/	𞓕𞓙 𞓙 ḥ IPA: /ʔ/		
𞓚 i IPA: /i/	𞓚𞓛 𞓛 s IPA: /s̪/	𞓚𞓜 𞓜 ḍ IPA: /ɖ/	𞓚𞓝 𞓝 t IPA: /t̪/	𞓚𞓞 𞓞 h IPA: /h/		
𞓟 u IPA: /u/	𞓟𞓠 𞓠 ch IPA: /t͡ʃ/	𞓟𞓡 𞓡 d IPA: /d̪/	𞓟𞓢 𞓢 k IPA: /k/	𞓟𞓣 𞓣 r IPA: /ɾ/		
𞓤 e IPA: /e/	𞓤𞓥 𞓥 ṇ IPA: /ɳ/	𞓤𞓦 𞓦 g IPA: /g/	𞓤𞓧 𞓧 m IPA: /m/	𞓤𞓨 𞓨 n IPA: /ɳ/	𞓤𞓩 𞓩 ṭ IPA: /ʈ/	𞓤𞓪 𞓪 ṛ / ḷ IPA: /ɽ/,/ɭ/

Because of centuries of contact with neighbouring eastern Indo-Aryan languages, specifically Bengali and Odia, dialects like Naguri and Kera have aspirated loan words. Because native Mundari lacks aspirated distinction, these aspirated phonemes are denoted by adding the /h/ letter (𞓞) to the consonant.

- Example: 𞓢 (/k/) + 𞓞 (/h/) → 𞓢𞓞 (/kʰ/)

There are no conjunct forms or ligatures, and the letters do not change shape in compound syllables, unlike Brahmic abugidas. Mundari also lacks gemination.

Below is the consonant phonology of Mundari depicted using Mundari Bani, which encompasses native phonemes (basic consonants shown in red and unique phonemes in blue) and aspirated loan words (shown in green).

Mundari Consonant Inventory
Stricture →	Occlusives					Sonorants			
Articulation →	Plosives & Affricates					Nasal	Approximant	Fricative	
Voicing →	Voiceless		Voiced		Checked (Note: Checked Consonants are a unique feature of the Munda language group wherein terminal /b/ and /d/ sounds are characterised by a simultaneous glottal closure and a faint nasal release.)	Voiced		Voiceless	Voiced
Aspiration → (Note: Native Mundari lacks aspirated distinction, but Naguri and Kera dialects include aspirated stops due to contact with Indo-Aryan languages. Unlike Brahmic abugidas, these sounds do not have a distinct glyph to represent them.)	Unaspirated	Aspirated	Unaspirated	Aspirated	Checked	Voiced		Voiceless	Voiced
Velar	𞓢 k IPA: /kɔ/	𞓢𞓞 kh IPA: /kʰɔ/	𞓦 g IPA: /ɡɔ/	𞓦𞓞 gh IPA: /ɡʱɔ/		𞓔 ṅ IPA: /ŋɔ/			
Palatal	𞓠 ch IPA: /tʃɔ/	𞓠𞓞 ch' IPA: /tʃʰɔ/	𞓖 j IPA: /dʒɔ/	𞓖𞓞 jh IPA: /dʒʱɔ/		𞓘 ñ IPA: /ɲɔ/	𞓓 y IPA: /jɔ/	𞓛𞓯 ś IPA: /ɕɔ/	
Alveolo-palatal (Note: The native phonemes for /tʃ/ and /dʒ/ are affricates, i.e. they start as a plosive and release immediately into a fricative, producing a "hissing" sound. Because of the variation between native pronunciation and dialects, the sound can become palatal in most cases and is speaker dependent.)	𞓠 tc IPA: /t͡ɕ/ (Note: The letter 𞓠 for /tʃ/ is also used to represent /t͡ɕ/.)		𞓖 dz IPA: /d͡ʑ/ (Note: The letter 𞓖 for /dʒ/ is also used to represent /d͡ʑ/.)						
Retroflex	𞓩 ṭ IPA: /ʈɔ/	𞓩𞓞 ṭh IPA: /ʈʰɔ/	𞓜 ḍ IPA: /ɖɔ/	𞓜𞓞 ḍh IPA: /ɖʱɔ/		𞓥 ṇ IPA: /ɳɔ/	𞓣 r IPA: /ɾɔ/	𞓛𞓯 ṣ IPA: /ʂɔ/	
Dental	𞓝 t IPA: /t̪ɔ/	𞓝𞓞 th IPA: /t̪ʰɔ/	𞓡 d IPA: /d̪ɔ/	𞓡𞓞 dh IPA: /d̪ʱɔ/	𞓫𞓡 d' IPA: /ˀd̥(ⁿ)/ (Note: The diacritic OJOD (𞓫) is applied by some authors to represent 'checked' forms of word-final /d/.)	𞓨 n IPA: /nɔ/	𞓪 ḷ IPA: /ɭɔ/	𞓛 s IPA: /sɔ/	
Labial	𞓑 p IPA: /pɔ/	𞓑𞓞 ph IPA: /pʰɔ/	𞓗 b IPA: /bɔ/	𞓗𞓞 bh IPA: /bʱɔ/	𞓫𞓗 b' IPA: /ˀb̥(ᵐ)/ (Note: The diacritic OJOD (𞓫) is applied by some authors to represent 'checked' forms of word-final /b/.)	𞓧 m IPA: /mɔ/	◌𞓮 w IPA: /ʷ/ (Note: This diacritic IKIR (◌𞓮) attaches to a vowel to impart a deep, rounded glide, creating a /ʷ/ sound, a unique phoneme of Munda languages)		
Glottal	𞓙 ḥ IPA: /ʔ/								𞓞 h IPA: /ɦɔ/

Notes:

Mundari grammar also categorises consonants into four categories according to their place of articulation:

- Soft consonants (Mundari: 𞓣𞓕𞓗𞓕𞓒 𞓗𞓐𞓖𞓕 𞓗𞓕𞓨𞓚, romanized: Rabal Boja Bani)

𞓢 k IPA: /k/	𞓦 g IPA: /g/	𞓠 c IPA: /tʃ/	𞓖 j IPA: /dʒ/	𞓩 ṭ IPA: /ʈ/	𞓜 ḍ IPA: /ɖ/	𞓝 t IPA: /t̪/	𞓡 d IPA: /d̪/	𞓑 p IPA: /p/	𞓗 b IPA: /b/

- Aspirated consonants (Mundari: 𞓞𞓕𞓧𞓗𞓕𞓒 𞓗𞓐𞓖𞓕 𞓗𞓕𞓨𞓚, romanized: Hambal Boja Bani)

𞓢𞓞 kh IPA: /kʰ/	𞓦𞓞 gh IPA: /ɡʱ/	𞓠𞓞 ch IPA: /tʃʰ/	𞓖𞓞 jh IPA: /dʒʱ/	𞓩𞓞 ṭh IPA: /ʈʰ/	𞓜𞓞 ḍh IPA: /ɖʰ/	𞓝𞓞 th IPA: /t̪ʱ/	𞓡𞓞 dh IPA: /d̪ʰ/	𞓑𞓞 ph IPA: /pʱ/	𞓗𞓞 bh IPA: /bʱ/

- Nasal consonants (Mundari: 𞓧𞓟𞓨𞓟 𞓗𞓐𞓖𞓕 𞓗𞓕𞓨𞓚, romanized: Munu Boja Bani)

𞓔 ṅ IPA: /ŋɔ/	𞓘 ñ IPA: /ɲɔ/	𞓥 ṇ IPA: /ṇ/	𞓨 n IPA: /ɳɔ/	𞓧 m IPA: /m/

- Unstructured consonants (Mundari: 𞓝𞓕𞓣𞓕 𞓗𞓐𞓖𞓕 𞓗𞓕𞓨𞓚, romanized: Tara Boja Bani).

𞓓 y IPA: /jɔ/	𞓒 l IPA: /lɔ/	𞓪 ṛ / ḷ IPA: /ɽ/,/ɭ/	𞓛 s IPA: /sɔ/	𞓙 ḥ IPA: /ʔ/	𞓞 h IPA: /ɦɔ/

=== Aspirated stops ===
A unique feature of Mundari is the word-final /b/ and /d/, which may be pronounced as checked sounds /ˀb̥(ᵐ)/ or /ˀd̥(ⁿ)/. This is represented by placing the diacritic OJOD (𞓫) before the consonant.

𞓫𞓡 d' IPA: /ˀd̥(ⁿ)/	𞓫𞓗 b' IPA: /ˀb̥(ᵐ/

- Example: Mundari: 𞓒𞓕𞓩𞓕𞓫𞓗, IPA: /laʈaˀb/ , Translation: Scissors

However, the use of OJOD to denote aspirated stops is dependent on the scribe and is not universal.

=== The Mundari /ʷ/ phoneme ===
The Mundari phoneme /w/ or /ʷ/ has two distinct forms of representation in Mundari Bani using the IKIR diacritic (◌𞓮):

- Consonantal /ʷ/: A standalone glide used at the beginning of syllables.

𞓢𞓮𞓕 kwa IPA: /kʷa/	𞓢𞓮𞓚 kwi IPA: /kʷi/

- Vocalic /ʷ/: It is written by adding the IKIR to the vowel that follows to impart a labialized glide.

𞓖𞓚𞓮𞓭 jīw IPA: /d͡ʑiʷ/	𞓢𞓕𞓮 kaw IPA: /kaʷ/

/w/ never occurs in the initial position in Mundari, but some use the IKIR in conjunction with vowel letters to write /wa/ or /wi/ syllables from other languages.

𞓕𞓮 wa IPA: /wa/	𞓚𞓮 wi IPA: /wi/

=== Loan Words ===
Loan words are denoted with the diacritic SUTUH (◌𞓯) when transcribed. Phonemes like 'ẏ', 'ṛ', 'ṛh', 'ś' and 'ṣ', which are common in Indo-Aryan languages, are denoted using the Mundari equivalent with the (◌𞓯).

𞓓𞓯 ẏ IPA: /y/	𞓜𞓯 ṛ IPA: /ɽɔ/	𞓜𞓯𞓞 ṛh IPA: /ɽʰɔ/	𞓛𞓯 ś IPA: /ɕɔ/	𞓛𞓯 ṣ IPA: /ʂɔ/

- 𞓛𞓯 is used to denote both /ʂɔ/ and /ɕɔ/ phonemes. The reader is expected to understand from context which phoneme is being depicted, often the case when transcribing widely used loan words.

In many eastern Indian languages, the sounds for 'b' and 'v/w' are closely related or interchangeable. While native Mundari uses 𞓕𞓮 for the /w/ sound, 𞓗𞓯 is sometimes used in formal transliteration to represent the /ʋ/, which is lacking in native Mundari.

- 𞓗 (/b/) + ◌𞓯 → 𞓗𞓯 (/ʋ/)

𞓗𞓯
v
IPA: /ʋ/

== Numerals ==
Mundari Bani has its own set of decimal digits (0–9) that function identically to standard Western numerals.

Mundari Digits ( 𞓒𞓤𞓨𞓤𞓢𞓕 Leneka )
0 𞓰 Sūn IPA: /s̪uːn/	1 𞓱 Mod' IPA: /moˀd̥(ⁿ)/	2 𞓲 Bar' IPA: /baːɾ/	3 𞓳 Āpī IPA: /aːpiː/	4 𞓴 Upun' IPA: /upun̪/	5 𞓵 Moñe IPA: /moŋe/	6 𞓶 Turī IPA: /t̪uriː/	7 𞓷 Eyā IPA: /ejaː/	8 𞓸 Irāl' IPA: /iraːl/	9 𞓹 Āre IPA: /aːre/	10 𞓱𞓰 Gel IPA: /gel/

Below are the names of the base digits (0-10) rendered in Mundari Bani:

Numeral	Mundari	Transliteration	Translation
𞓰	𞓛𞓟𞓭𞓨	Sūn	Zero
𞓱	𞓧𞓐𞓡𞓫	Mod'	One
𞓲	𞓗𞓕𞓭𞓫𞓣	Bar'	Two
𞓳	𞓚𞓭𞓑𞓚𞓭	Āpī	Three
𞓴	𞓟𞓑𞓟𞓫𞓨	Upun'	four
𞓵	𞓧𞓐𞓥𞓤	Moñe	Five
𞓶	𞓝𞓟𞓣𞓚𞓭	Turī	Six
𞓷	𞓤𞓓𞓕𞓭	Eyā	Seven
𞓸	𞓚𞓣𞓕𞓡𞓒	Irāl'	Eight
𞓹	𞓕𞓣𞓤	Āre	Nine
𞓱𞓰	𞓦𞓤𞓒	Gel	Ten

== Sample text ==
The following text is Article 1 of the Universal Declaration of Human Rights, written in Mundari Bani: (Note: a suitable Unicode font may be required for proper viewing)

=== Mundari Script ===
𞓝𞓐𞓨𞓐𞓗-𞓱: 𞓛𞓐𞓗𞓤𞓨 𞓞𞓐𞓪𞓐 𞓢𞓐𞓢𞓤𞓮 𞓧𞓕𞓨𞓕𞓣𞓔 𞓐𞓜𞓐𞓙 𞓐𞓢𞓝𞓚𞓓𞓕𞓣 𞓢𞓐𞓣𞓤𞓓𞓕𞓦 𞓑𞓕𞓚𞓝𞓚 𞓗𞓕𞓗𞓐𞓝 𞓣𞓤 𞓖𞓐𞓨𞓐𞓧 𞓖𞓐𞓣𞓐𞓔𞓤𞓝𞓤 𞓕𞓡𞓕𞓨𞓕𞓡 𞓐𞓜𞓐𞓦 𞓗𞓐𞓣𞓕𞓗𞓐𞓣𞓚 𞓨𞓕𞓧𞓕𞓢𞓕𞓨𞓕. 𞓚𞓨𞓢𞓟𞓦𞓢𞓤 𞓛𞓤𞓥𞓕 𞓐𞓜𞓐𞓦 𞓖𞓚𞓮𞓭 𞓑𞓤𞓪𞓤𞓦 𞓖𞓚𞓭𞓟𞓣𞓤𞓓𞓕𞓙 𞓤𞓨𞓤𞓧𞓢𞓐 𞓨𞓕𞓧𞓕𞓢𞓕𞓨𞓕 𞓐𞓜𞓐𞓙 𞓚𞓨𞓢𞓟𞓙 𞓒𞓐𞓙𞓝𞓤 𞓞𞓕𞓦𞓤𞓓𞓕 𞓗𞓐𞓓𞓕 𞓒𞓤𞓢𞓕 𞓖𞓕𞓦𞓕𞓣 𞓗𞓕𞓢𞓕𞓝𞓚𞓘𞓕𞓙.

=== Romanisation ===
Tonob-Mod: Soben hoḷo kokew manarng oḍoḥ oktiyar koreyag paiti babot re jonom jorongete adanad oḍog borabori namakana. Inkugke seṇa oḍog jīw peḷeg jī ureyaḥ enemko namakana oḍoḥ inkuḥ loḥte hageya boya leka jagar bakatiñaḥ.

=== IPA Transcription ===
t̪onob-mod̪: soben hoɽo kokeʷ manaraŋ oɖoʔ okt̪iaːra koreʔ pait̪i-baːbat̪a re d͡ʑanama d͡ʑoroŋɡʔet̪e ahɖaːnaɖa oɽoo baraːbariː namaː kanaː. inku ke seŋɽãː oɽoo-d͡ʑiʷː peɽeː, d͡ʑiːu reʔ enemako namaː kanaː oɽoo inku looːt̪e haɡeaː-woaː lekaː d͡ʑaɡar bakat̪iɲaʔ.

=== Translation ===
Article 1: All human beings are born free and equal in dignity and rights. They are endowed with reason and conscience and should act towards one another in a spirit of brotherhood.

== Unicode ==
The Mundari Bani alphabet was added to the Unicode Standard in September, 2022 with the release of version 15.0. The Unicode block is called Nag Mundari (U+1E4D0–U+1E4FF):

Nag Mundari^{[1]}^{[2]} Official Unicode Consortium code chart (PDF)
	0	1	2	3	4	5	6	7	8	9	A	B	C	D	E	F
U+1E4Dx	𞓐	𞓑	𞓒	𞓓	𞓔	𞓕	𞓖	𞓗	𞓘	𞓙	𞓚	𞓛	𞓜	𞓝	𞓞	𞓟
U+1E4Ex	𞓠	𞓡	𞓢	𞓣	𞓤	𞓥	𞓦	𞓧	𞓨	𞓩	𞓪	𞓫	𞓬	𞓭	𞓮	𞓯
U+1E4Fx	𞓰	𞓱	𞓲	𞓳	𞓴	𞓵	𞓶	𞓷	𞓸	𞓹						
Notes 1.As of Unicode version 18.0 2.Grey areas indicate non-assigned code points

== Sources ==
- Anderson, Gregory D.S, ed. (2008). The Munda languages. Routledge Language Family Series 3. New York: Routledge. ISBN 0-415-32890-X.
