= Cybister cardoni =

Scientific classification
- Kingdom: Animalia
- Phylum: Arthropoda
- Class: Insecta
- Order: Coleoptera
- Suborder: Adephaga
- Family: Dytiscidae
- Genus: Cybister
- Species: C. cardoni

Binomial name
- Cybister cardoni Severin, 1890

Synonyms
- Cybister (Melanectes) cardoni Severin, 1890

Species of beetle

Cybister cardoni, is a species of predaceous diving beetle found in India, Bangladesh, Myanmar, Pakistan, and Sri Lanka.

The species name is after Father Louis Cardon from whose specimen the species was described.
