= Rohidas Singh Nag =

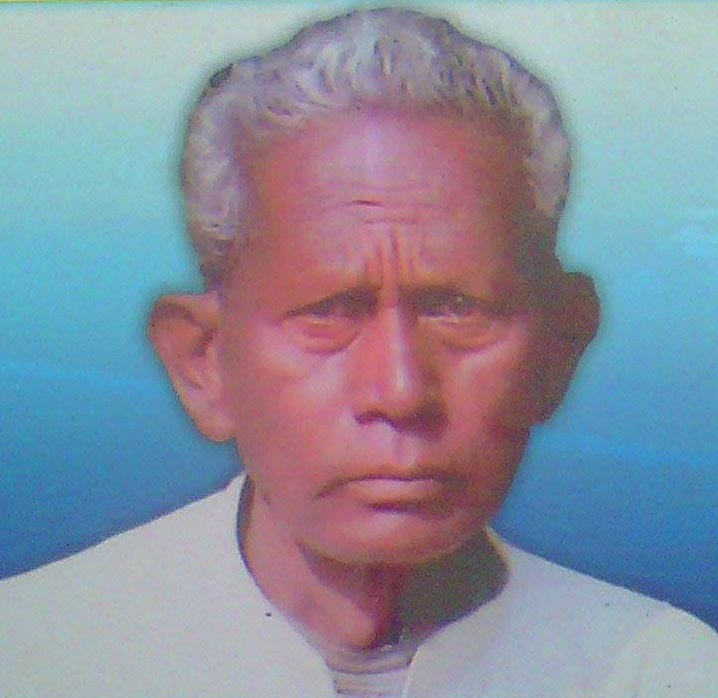
- Born: 5 February 1934; Chandua, Mayurbhanj, Odisha, British Raj (now India)
- Died: 30 December 2012 (aged 78); Salbani, Mayurbhanj, Odisha
- Occupation: Writer
- Writing career
- Subject: Linguistics

Rohidas Singh Nag (5 February 1934 – 30 December 2012) was the inventor of the Mundari Bani script, which is used to write the Mundari language.

== History ==
Rohidas Singh Nag was born on 5 February 1934 in Chandua village, Mayurbhanj district of Odisha. In 1949, while Rohidas Singh Nag was studying at class III, he invented the Mundari script, or Mundari Bani, and wrote the alphabet on the wall of his school using clay. In 1953, he expanded the alphabet of the Mundari script, however he later simplified it and in 1980 a total 27 letters were selected for use. That same year he brought it to the knowledge of the then Chief Minister of Odisha Shri J. B. Pattnaik on the development of the Mundari script and submitted a memorandum to recognize the Munda language constitutionally. In 1999 Rohidas Singh Nag, with others, submitted a memorandum to the then president of India and appealed for constitutional recognition of the Munda language.
