= Mundari language =

Munda language spoken in eastern India

Mundari
- 𞓞𞓐𞓪𞓐 𞓖𞓕𞓦𞓕𞓣, horo jagar
- 𞓧𞓟𞓨𞓜𞓕𞓣𞓚 ମୁଣ୍ଡାରୀ • मुंडारी • মুন্ডারি
- Muṇḍārī in Mundari Bani script
- Pronunciation: [muɳɖaːriː]
- Native to: India, Bangladesh, Nepal
- Region: Chota Nagpur Plateau in Eastern India, and parts of North Eastern India: Jharkhand; Odisha (significant minority in the northern districts); West Bengal (minority in the south western districts); Assam (minority); Mainly in Rajshahi Division and pockets in Rangpur and Sylhet Divisions of Bangladesh: Naogaon District (around 2,500 speakers); Around 7,700 speakers in Kosi Zone in Nepal: Morang District; Sunsari District
- Ethnicity: Mundas, Kurukhs
- Native speakers: 1.6 million (2011 census) (Note: According to the 2011 Census, 1,128,228 people in India reported Mundari, 505,922 reported Munda as their mother tongue, totalling 1,634,150 individuals, or approximately 1.6 million.)
- Language family: Austroasiatic: Munda; North; Kherwarian; Mundaric; Mundari
- Dialects: Hasada; Naguri; Tamaria; Kera (a creole spoken by Kurukh speakers)
- Writing system: Mundari Bani (native); Others: Odia; Devanagari; Bengali; Latin

Official status
- Official language in: India: Jharkhand (additional)

Language codes
- ISO 639-3: Either: unr – Mundari unx – Munda
- Glottolog: mund1320
- Areas with a significant concentration of Munda language speakers in red.

- Mundari is classified as Vulnerable by the UNESCO Atlas of the World's Languages in Danger

Mundari (Mundari Bani: 𞓧𞓟𞓨𞓜𞓕𞓣𞓚, romanised: Muṇḍārī, IPA: Mundari pronunciation: [muɳɖaːriː]) is a Munda language of the Austroasiatic language family spoken by the Munda tribes native to the Chota Nagpur Plateau region in India with over 1.5 million native speakers. It is closely related to Ho and Santali, and along with Bhumij, is one of the four major Munda languages. Mundari is an additional official language in the state of Jharkhand, and has significant speakers in eastern Indian states of Odisha and West Bengal and northern Rangpur Division of Bangladesh. In India, Mundari is recognised as a significant minority language. However, its speakers are often bilingual in Hindi or the local state language.

Mundari is an agglutinative language characterised by its complex morphology, where multiple affixes are added to roots to convey grammatical relationships. While historically transmitted through oral tradition, Mundari is now written using several scripts, most notably Mundari Bani, invented by Rohidas Singh Nag specifically to write Mundari. It has also been written in the Devanagari, Odia, Bengali, and Latin writing systems.

Mundari has been classified as a vulnerable language according to the UNESCO Atlas of the World's Languages in Danger. It remains a subject of extensive linguistic study due to its unique grammatical structure and its role in understanding the migration patterns of Austroasiatic speakers in South Asia.

== History ==
The term Muɳɖa means "village headman" in Mundari. Neighboring communities of the Mundas referred to their language as Muɳɖārī, and the Mundas themselves call it hoɽo dʒagar ("human language"; hoɽo–"man", dʒagar–"to speak, speech") or muɳɖa dʒagar ("Munda language"). Studies on Mundari started in the nineteenth century, pioneered by the works of Haldar (1871), Whitley (1873), and Nottrott (1882), though most of them were brief sketches and documentations. Then in 1903, German missionary/linguist John Hoffmann initiated two massive and influential projects on Mundari: Mundari Grammar (1903–1905) and Encyclopaedia Mundarica (1903–1978), the latter was completed long after his death and was published posthumously.

Mundari language song

== Geographical distribution ==
Historical speaker of Mundari language variety
| Census | Munda (±%) | | Mundari (±%) | | Total (±%) |
|---|---|---|---|---|---|---|
| 1971 | 309,293 | | 771,253 | | 1,080,546 |
| 1981 | 377,492 | (+22) | 742,739 | (-4) | 1,120,231 | (+3.6) |
| 1991 | 413,894 | (+9.6) | 861,378 | (+16) | 1,275,272 | (+13.8) |
| 2001 | 469,357 | (+13.5) | 1,061,352 | (+23) | 1,530,709 | (+20.0) |
| 2011 | 505,922 | (+7.8) | 1,128,228 | (+6) | 1,634,150 | (+6.7) |
Source: Census of India

Distribution of Mundari language (incl. Munda) in the states of India (2011)
1. Jharkhand (57.6%)
2. Odisha (29.5%)
3. Assam (5.70%)
4. West Bengal (4.73%)
5. Other (2.49%)

Mundari is spoken in the Khunti, Ranchi, Seraikela Kharsawan and West Singhbhum, East Singhbhum district of Jharkhand, and in the Mayurbhanj, Kendujhar, Sundargarh district of Odisha by at least 1.1 million people. Another 500,000, mainly in Odisha and Assam, are recorded in the census as speaking "Munda," potentially another name for Mundari.

== Status ==
In 2011, Mundari was recognised as an additional official language of Jharkhand under the Jharkhand Official Language (Amendment) Act, 2011. This status allows for the language to be used in administrative and cultural contexts alongside Hindi, the state's primary official language.

== Dialects ==
Mundari has the following dialects which are spoken mostly in Jharkhand state:

- Hasada (𞓞𞓕𞓛𞓡𞓕𞓙, [hasa-daʔ]): east of the Ranchi-Chaibasa Road
- Naguri (𞓨𞓕𞓦𞓟𞓣𞓚, [naɡuri]): west of the Ranchi-Chaibasa Road
- Tamaria (𞓝𞓕𞓧𞓕𞓪𞓚𞓕, [t̪amaɽ-ia]) or Latar (𞓒𞓕𞓝𞓕𞓫𞓣, [lat̪aɾ]): Panchpargana area (Tamar, Bundu, Rahe, Sonahatu, Silli)
- Kera (𞓢𞓤𞓣𞓕𞓙, [keraʔ]): ethnic Oraon who live in the Ranchi city area.

== Phonology ==
The phonology of Mundari is similar to the surrounding closely related Austroasiatic languages but considerably different from either Indo-Aryan or Dravidian. Perhaps the most foreign phonological influence has been on the vowels. Whereas the branches of Austroasiatic in Southeast Asia are rich in vowel phonemes, Mundari has only five. The consonant inventory of Mundari is similar to other Austroasiatic languages with the exception of retroflex consonants, which seem to appear only in loanwords. (Osada 2008)

=== Vowels ===
Mundari has five vowel phonemes. All vowels have long and short as well as nasalized allophones, but neither length nor nasality are contrastive. All vowels in open monosyllables are quantitatively longer than those in closed syllables, and those following nasal consonants or /ɟ/ are nasalized. Vowels preceding or following /ɳ/ are also nasalized.

| | Front | Central | Back |
|---|---|---|---|
| Close | i | | u |
| Mid | e | | o |
| Open | | a | |

=== Consonants ===
Mundari's consonant inventory consists of 23 basic phonemes. The Naguri and Kera dialects include aspirated stops as additional phonemes, here enclosed in parentheses.

| | | Labial | Dental | Retroflex | Palatal | Velar | Glottal |
|---|---|---|---|---|---|---|---|
| Nasal | | m | n̪ | ɳ | ɲ | ŋ | |
| Plosive | voiceless | p | t̪ | ʈ | t͡ɕ | k | ʔ |
| Plosive | aspirated | (pʰ) | (t̪ʰ) | (ʈʰ) | (t͡ɕʰ) | (kʰ) | |
| Plosive | voiced | b | d̪ | ɖ | d͡ʑ | ɡ | |
| Fricative | | | s̪ | | | | h |
| Approximant | | w | l | ɽ | j | | |
| Trill | | | r | | | | |

== Counting ==
| S.No. | Mundari | Transliteration | Translation |
|---|---|---|---|
| 1 | मियद | Miyad | One |
| 2 | बारिया | Baria | Two |
| 3 | आपिया | Apia | Three |
| 4 | उपनिआ | Upnia | four |
| 5 | मोड़ेया | Modea | Five |
| 6 | तुरिया | Turia | Six |
| 7 | एया | Are | Seven |
| 8 | इरलिया | Erlia | Eight |
| 9 | आरेया | Area | Nine |
| 10 | गेलेया | Galea | Ten |
| 11 | | Gel Miyad | Eleven |
| 12 | | Gel Bariya | Twelve |
| 13 | | Apiya | Thirteen |
| 14 | | Upuna | Fourteen |
| 15 | | Modeya | Fifteen |
| 16 | | Turiya | Sixteen |
| 17 | | Eya | Seventeen |
| 18 | | Iriliya | Eighteen |
| 19 | | Areya | Nineteen |
| 20 | | Mid Hisi | Twenty |
| 21 | | Hisi Miyad | Twenty-one |
| 30 | | Mid hisi Gel | Thirty |
| 31 | | Hisi Gel Miyad | Thirty-one |
| 40 | | Bar Hisi | Forty |
| 41 | | Bar Hisi Miyad | Forty-one |
| 50 | | Bar Hisi Gel | Fifty |
| 60 | | Aapi Hisi | Sixty |
| 70 | | Aapi Hisi Gel | Seventy |
| 80 | | Upun Hisi | Eighty |
| 90 | | Upun Hisi Gel | Ninety |
| 100 | | Mid Saaye | One hundred |
| 200 | | Bar Saaye | Two hundred |
| 1000 | | Mid Hazar | One thousand |
| 1,00,000 | | Mid Lak | One lakh |

== Relations ==
The table below shows familial relations in Mundari:

| Mundari | Transliteration | Translation | Odia | Devanagari | Bengali |
|---|---|---|---|---|---|
| 𞓤𞓔𞓦𞓕 | Eṅga | Mother | ଏଙ୍ଗା | एङ्गा | এঙ্গা |
| 𞓕𞓭𞓑𞓟 | Apu | Father | ଆପୁ | आपु | আপু |
| 𞓞𞓟𞓦𞓕𞓭 | Hagā | Brother | ହାଗା | हागा | হাগা |
| 𞓧𞓚𞓛𞓚 | Misi | Sister | ମିସି | मिसि | মিসি |
| 𞓛𞓕𞓢𞓚𞓔 𞓤𞓔𞓦𞓕 | Sakiṅ Eṅga | Paternal Grand Mother | ସାକିଂ ଏଙ୍ଗା | साकिं एङ्गा | সাকিং এঙ্গা |
| 𞓛𞓕𞓢𞓚𞓔 𞓕𞓭𞓑𞓟 | Sakiṅ Apu | Paternal Grand Father | ସାକିଂ ଆପୁ | साकिं आपु | সাকিং আপু |
| 𞓧𞓕𞓧𞓟 𞓐𞓪𞓕𞓙 𞓛𞓕𞓢𞓚𞓔 𞓤𞓔𞓦𞓕 | Mamuolaḥ Sakiṅ Eṅga | Maternal Grand Mother | ମାମୁଅଲାଃ ସାକିଂ ଏଙ୍ଗା | मामुअलाः साकिं एङ्गा | মামুঅলাঃ সাকিং এঙ্গা |
| 𞓧𞓕𞓧𞓟 𞓐𞓪𞓕𞓙 𞓛𞓕𞓢𞓚𞓔 𞓕𞓭𞓑𞓟 | Mamuolaḥ Sakiṅ Apu | Maternal Grand Father | ମାମୁଅଲାଃ ସାକିଂ ଆପୁ | मामुअलाः साकिं आपु | মামুঅলাঃ সাকিং আপু |
| 𞓞𞓟𞓜𞓚𞓔 𞓤𞓔𞓦𞓕 | Huḍiṅ Eṅga | Aunt | ହୁଡିଂ ଏଙ୍ଗା | हुडिं एङ्गा | হুডিং এঙ্গা |
| 𞓞𞓟𞓜𞓚𞓔 𞓕𞓭𞓑𞓟 | Huḍiṅ Apu | Uncle | ହୁଡିଂ ଆପୁ | हुडिं आबा | হুডিং আপু |
| 𞓧𞓕𞓣𞓕𞓔 𞓤𞓔𞓦𞓕 | Maraṅ Eṅga | Elder Mother | ମାରାଂ ଏଙ୍ଗା | मारां एङ्गा | মারাং এঙ্গা |
| 𞓧𞓕𞓣𞓕𞓔 𞓕𞓭𞓑𞓟 | Maraṅ Apu | Elder Father | ମାରାଂ ଆପୁ | मारां आपु | মারাং আপু |
| 𞓞𞓐𞓨𞓢𞓟𞓪𞓚 | Hon Kuṛi | Daughter | ହୋନକୁଲି | होनकुलि | হোনকুলি |
| 𞓞𞓐𞓨𞓢𞓟𞓪𞓕 | Hon koṛa | Son | ହୋନକୁଲ | होनकुल | হোনকুল |

== Verb ==
| Mundari | Transliteration | Translation |
|---|---|---|
| रिकाएआ | Rikā'ē'ā | Does |
| ओलेआ | Ol'ē'ā | Write |
| जगरेआ | Jagor'ē'ā | Talk |
| पढ़वएआ | Padv'ē'ā | Read |
| लेलेआ | Lel'ē'ā | Look / see |
| सेनेआ | Sen'ē'ā | Come along with |
| नमेआ | Nem'ē'ā | Found |
| निरेआ | Nir'ē'ā | Run |
| सबेआ | Sab'ē'ā | Hold |
| लेका एआ | Leka'ē'ā | Count |
| मुकाएआ | Muka'ē'ā | Measure |
| रिका एआ | Rika'ē'ā | Cut |
| হেড়েম | Hedem | Sweet |
| | Kete-e | Hard |
| | Lebe-e | Soft |
| | Singi | Sun |
| | Chandu-u | Moon |
| | Ipil | Stars |
| | Sirma | Sky |
| | Ote Dishum | Earth |
| | Rimil | cloud |
| | Hoyo | Air/Wind |
| | Gitil | Sands |
| | Dhudi | Dust |
| | Losod | Muddy |
| | Hodomo | Body |
| | Tasad | Grass |
| | Daru | Tree |
| | Sakam | Leaf |
| | Dayir | Branches of Tree |

== Grammar ==
In 1903, Hoffmann noted something abnormal with the Mundari lexicon: the lack of discrete lexical distinction. Mundari lexemes are not inherently specified for lexical categories. He made several following impressions:

Mundari words have such a great vagueness or functional elasticity that there can be no question of distinct parts of speech in that language

— Hoffmann (1903), repeated in Encyclopaedia Mundarica (1928)

[...]Thus the same unchanged form is at the same time a Conjunction, an Adjective, a Pronoun, an Adverb, a Verb, and a Noun, or, to speak more precisely, it may become a Conjunction, an Adjective, and so on, but by itself alone it is none of them. It is simply a vague elastic word, capable of signifying, in a vague manner, several distinct concepts, that is of assuming a variety of functions.

— Hoffmann (1903, p. xxi)

Similar issues with word class distinction have been also reported in other Munda languages, especially North Munda (Santali (Bodding 1929, Ghosh 1994, Neukom 2001), Ho (Deeney 1978), Korku (Drake 1903, Zide (undated)), Kharia (Pinnow 1960, Peterson 2003), Juang. Grierson (1906) summarized the issue in his Linguistic Survey of India:

[...]The various classes of words are not clearly distinguished. The same base can often be used as a noun, an adjective, or a verb. Spoken language, of course, is not composed of words but of sentences, and the meaning of each individual word is only apparent from the context. The Munda words simply denote some being, object, action, or the like, but they do not tell us how they are conceived. It is for instance only after inspection of the context that we can decide whether a word denoting the idea "to give" means "giving" or "given."

— Grierson (1906, p. 28)

Modern typologist interest in Mundari lexical categories was revitalized by Cook (1965), Langendoen (1967), Sinha (1975), Osada (1992), Bhat (1994), and most famously Evans & Osada (2005). Evans & Osada challenged the flexible analysis, contending instead that Mundari exhibits distinct yet exceptionally fluid grammatical categories (nouns, verbs, and adjectives). Their argument rests upon three specific criteria for assessing flexibility: (i) explicit semantic compositionality across both argument and predicate functions, (ii) bidirectionality, and (iii) exhaustiveness. This research prompted an extensive series of peer reviews and criticism within the same volume of Linguistic Typology. Notwithstanding these debates, Osada (1992), Badenoch & Osada (2019), and Badenoch et al. (2019) identify expressives as a further open lexical class in Mundari, encompassing a minimum of 1,500 lemmas. Mark Dingemanse comments: "yet the status of this considerable lexical stratum in the language has not featured in any word-class debates."

This section will leave out the discussions on Mundari & North Munda flexibility and focus on the morphological differences between two main dialects, Hasadaʔ and Keraʔ, specifically in relation to their respective approaches to lexical flexibility.

In Hasadaʔ Mundari, entity-denoting lexemes and structures or "noun"-like, "noun phrase"-like, and "adjective"-like all can be used as semantic bases of predicates (i.e. "verbs") without derivation. The "verbal" constructions' semantic results are often compositional (predictable), but sometimes they can be idiosyncratic.

buru=ko bai-ke-d-a
mountain=3PL.SUBJ make-COMPL-TR-IND
'They made the mountain.'

saan=ko buru-ke-d-a
firewood=3PL.SUBJ mountain-COMPL-TR-IND
'They heaped up the firewood.' (Lit. 'They mountained the firewood.')

aɲ hen-saʔ ne-saʔ-ken-a=ɲ
I that-side this-side-MID.PST-IND=1SG.SUBJ
'I moved to this side and that, walked back and forth.' (Lit. 'I that-side this-side-ed')

eŋga-oʔ-ta-n-a=eʔ
mother-PASS-PROG.OR-INTR-IND=3SG.SUBJ
'She is becoming a mother.' (Lit. 'She's mothering')

In contrast, Keraʔ Mundari does not allow such blatant uses of "zero-derivation" (i.e. conversion) like in Hasadaʔ and other dialects. Nouns can only used as verbs with the sense of performing the semantical action with the presence of verbalizing suffix -o/-u. For examples:

1. aɽandi "wedding"

aɽandi-u-a=le
wedding-VBLZR:do-IND=1PL.SUBJ
'We conduct wedding.'

1. sindri "vermillion"

sindri-u-a=le
vermillion-VBLZR:do-IND=1PL.SUBJ
'We put vermillion.'

Regarding the limit of flexibility, there is an infix -n- that can be inserted into certain Mundari lexemes, which "transforms the verb root into an abstract inanimate noun stem, which is no longer capable of verb inflection". Per Hengeveld & Rijkhoff (2005), citing Cook (1965)'s data:

dal "strike" → da-n-al "a blow"

dub "sit" → du-n-ub "a meeting"

ol "to write" → o-n-ol "the writing"

== Writing system ==
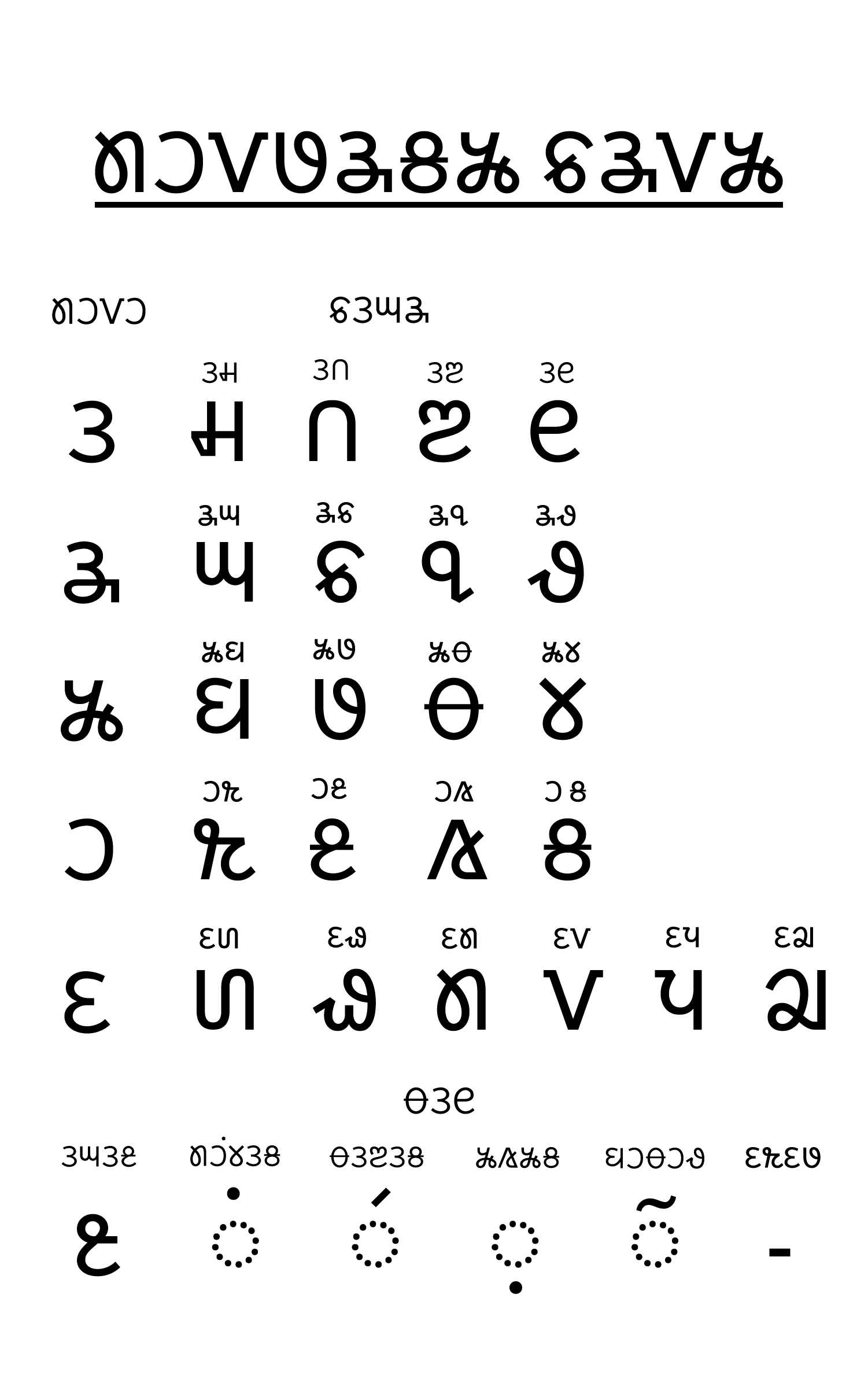
Mundari Bani Alphabet Chart

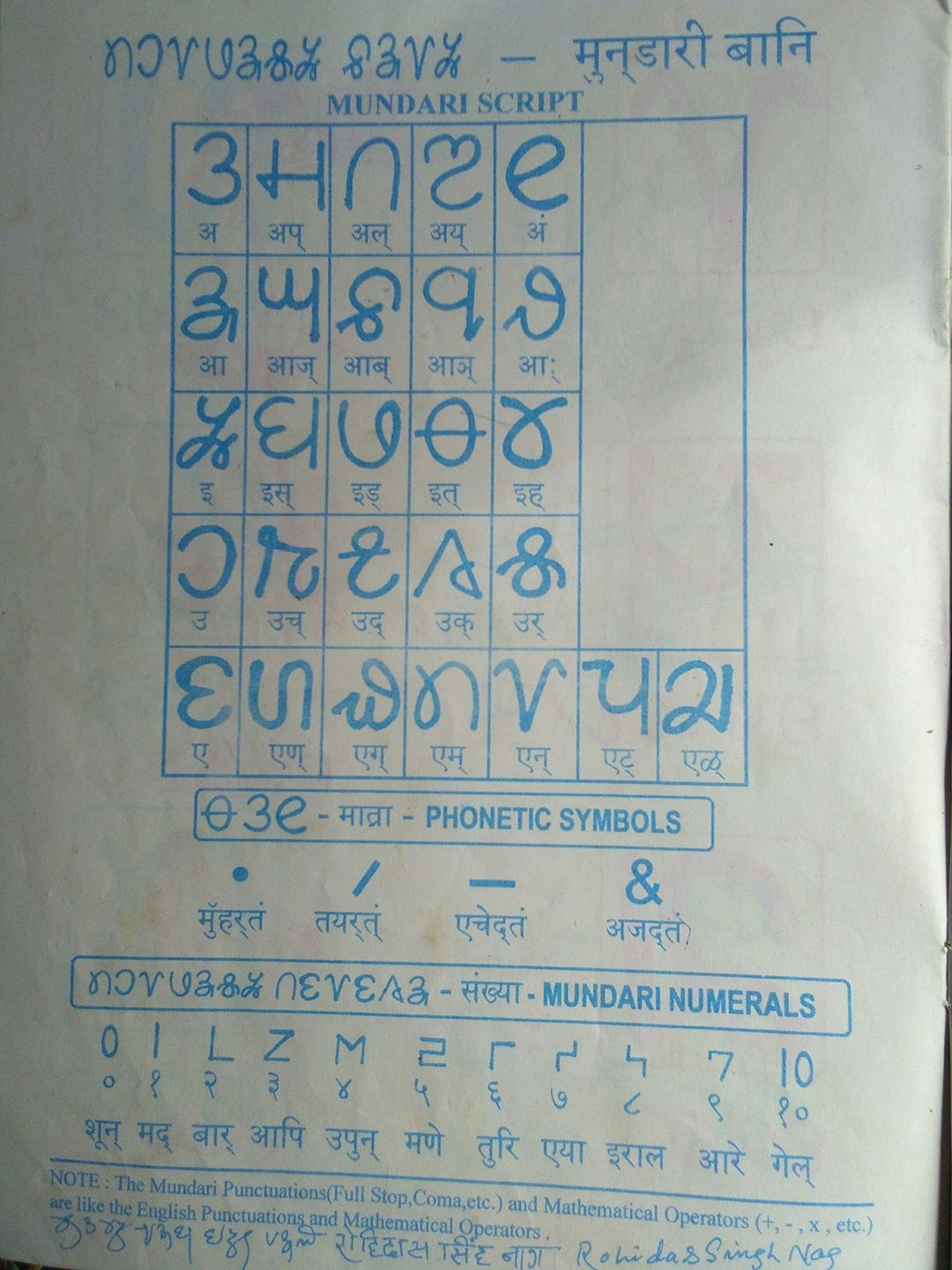
A Primer for Mundari Bani (Mundari Script)

Mandari is written in native Mundari Bani (Mundari: 𞓧𞓟𞓨𞓜𞓕𞓣𞓚 𞓗𞓕𞓨𞓚, romanized: Mundari Bani), invented in the 1980s by Rohidas Singh Nag, which has since seen limited but increasing use in literature, education, and computing. It is a true alphabet that consists of 27 distinct letters and 5 diacritical marks, the forms of which are intended to evoke natural shapes. The script is unicameral, written from left to right, and consonants do not possess an inherent vowel. They are organised into five clusters, each led by a primary vowel. The first letter of the consonant's name matches the primary vowel. Their names follow traditional naming schemes.

Mundari consonants (𞓗𞓐𞓖𞓕 𞓗𞓕𞓨𞓚 Boja Bani)
| 𞓐 o IPA: /o/ | 𞓐𞓑 𞓑 p IPA: /p/ | 𞓐𞓒 𞓒 l IPA: /l/ | 𞓐𞓓 𞓓 y IPA: /j/ | 𞓐𞓔 𞓔 ṅ IPA: /ŋ/ | | |
| 𞓕 a IPA: /a/ | 𞓕𞓖 𞓖 j IPA: /d͡ʑ/ | 𞓕𞓗 𞓗 b IPA: /b/ | 𞓕𞓘 𞓘 ñ IPA: /ɲ/ | 𞓕𞓙 𞓙 ḥ IPA: /ʔ/ | | |
| 𞓚 i IPA: /i/ | 𞓚𞓛 𞓛 s IPA: /s̪/ | 𞓚𞓜 𞓜 ḍ IPA: /ɖ/ | 𞓚𞓝 𞓝 t IPA: /t̪/ | 𞓚𞓞 𞓞 h IPA: /h/ | | |
| 𞓟 u IPA: /u/ | 𞓟𞓠 𞓠 ch IPA: /t͡ʃ/ | 𞓟𞓡 𞓡 d IPA: /d̪/ | 𞓟𞓢 𞓢 k IPA: /k/ | 𞓟𞓣 𞓣 r IPA: /ɾ/ | | |
| 𞓤 e IPA: /e/ | 𞓤𞓥 𞓥 ṇ IPA: /ɳ/ | 𞓤𞓦 𞓦 g IPA: /g/ | 𞓤𞓧 𞓧 m IPA: /m/ | 𞓤𞓨 𞓨 n IPA: /ɳ/ | 𞓤𞓩 𞓩 ṭ IPA: /ʈ/ | 𞓤𞓪 𞓪 ṛ / ḷ IPA: /ɽ/,/ɭ/ |

Mundari Diacritics ( 𞓝𞓐𞓔 Toṅ/Tong )
| 𞓐𞓖𞓐𞓡 𞓫 OJOD | 𞓧𞓟𞓬𞓞𞓐𞓣 ◌𞓬 MUHOR IPA: /◌̃/ | 𞓝𞓐𞓓𞓐𞓣 ◌𞓭 TOYOR IPA: /ʷ/ | 𞓚𞓢𞓚𞓣 ◌𞓮 IKIR IPA: /ː/ | 𞓛𞓟𞓝𞓟𞓙 ◌𞓯 SUTUH |

Mundari is also written in Odia, Devanagari and Bengali scripts.

== Sample text ==
The following text is Article 1 of the Universal Declaration of Human Rights, written in Mundari:

=== Mundari Script ===
𞓝𞓐𞓨𞓐𞓗-𞓱: 𞓛𞓐𞓗𞓤𞓨 𞓞𞓐𞓪𞓐 𞓢𞓐𞓢𞓤𞓮 𞓧𞓕𞓨𞓕𞓣𞓔 𞓐𞓜𞓐𞓙 𞓐𞓢𞓝𞓚𞓓𞓕𞓣 𞓢𞓐𞓣𞓤𞓓𞓕𞓦 𞓑𞓕𞓚𞓝𞓚 𞓗𞓕𞓗𞓐𞓝 𞓣𞓤 𞓖𞓐𞓨𞓐𞓧 𞓖𞓐𞓣𞓐𞓔𞓤𞓝𞓤 𞓕𞓡𞓕𞓨𞓕𞓡 𞓐𞓜𞓐𞓦 𞓗𞓐𞓣𞓕𞓗𞓐𞓣𞓚 𞓨𞓕𞓧𞓕𞓢𞓕𞓨𞓕. 𞓚𞓨𞓢𞓟𞓦𞓢𞓤 𞓛𞓤𞓥𞓕 𞓐𞓜𞓐𞓦 𞓖𞓚𞓮𞓭 𞓑𞓤𞓪𞓤𞓦 𞓖𞓚𞓭𞓟𞓣𞓤𞓓𞓕𞓙 𞓤𞓨𞓤𞓧𞓢𞓐 𞓨𞓕𞓧𞓕𞓢𞓕𞓨𞓕 𞓐𞓜𞓐𞓙 𞓚𞓨𞓢𞓟𞓙 𞓒𞓐𞓙𞓝𞓤 𞓞𞓕𞓦𞓤𞓓𞓕 𞓗𞓐𞓓𞓕 𞓒𞓤𞓢𞓕 𞓖𞓕𞓦𞓕𞓣 𞓗𞓕𞓢𞓕𞓝𞓚𞓘𞓕𞓙.

=== Odia Script ===
ତୋନୋବ୍ ୧. - ସୋବେନ ହୋଡ଼ୋକୋ କେ ମନରଂଗ ଓଡ଼ୋଃ ଅକ୍ତିୟାର କୋ ରେଅଃ ତଇତି-ବାବତ ରେ ଜନମ ଜୋରୋଂଗ୍ଏତେ ଅହ୍ଡାନଡ ଓଡ଼ୋଃ ବରା ବରୀ ନମା କନା। ଇନକୁ କେ ସେଂଡ଼ାଁ ଓଡ଼ୋଃ-ଜୀ ପେଡେଃ, ଜୀଉ ରେଅଃ ଏନେମକୋ ନମା କନା ଓଡ଼ୋଃ ଇନକୁ ଲୋଓଃତେ ହଗେଆ-ୱୋଆ ଲେକା ଜଗର ବକଡ଼ ଲଗାତିଂଗ୍ଅଃ।

=== Devanagari Script ===
तोनोब् १. - सोबेन होड़ोको के मनरंग ओडोओ अक्तियार को रेअः पइति-बाबत रे जनम जोरोंग्एते अह्डानड ओड़ोओ बराबरी नमा कना। इनकु के सेंड़ॉ ओड़ोओ-जी पेडेः, जीउ रेअः एनेमको नमा कना ओड़ोओ इनकु लोओःते हगेया-वोया लेका जगर बकर लगातिंग्अः॥

=== Bengali Script ===
তোনোব্ ১. - সোবেন হোড়োকো কে মনরংগ ওড়োও অক্তিয়ার কো রেঅঃ পইতি-বাবত রে জনম জোরোংগ্এতে অহ্ডানড ওড়োও বরাবরী নমা কনা। ইনকু কে সেংড়াঁ ওড়োও-জী পেডেঃ, জীউ রেঅঃ এনেমকো নমা কনা ওড়োও ইনকু লোওঃতে হগেয়া-ওয়োয়া লেকা জগর বকড় লগাতিংগ্অঃ।

=== Romanisation ===
Tonob'-Mod: Soben hoḷo kokew manarng oḍoḥ oktiyar koreyag paiti babot re jonom jorongete adanad oḍog borabori namakana. Inkugke seṇa oḍog jīw peḷeg jī ureyaḥ enemko namakana oḍoḥ inkuḥ loḥte hageya boya leka jagar bakatiñaḥ.

=== IPA transcription ===
t̪onob-mod̪: soben hoɽoko ke manaraŋɡa oɽoo akt̪iaːra ko reʔ pait̪i-baːbat̪a re d͡ʑanama d͡ʑoroŋɡʔet̪e ahɖaːnaɖa oɽoo baraːbariː namaː kanaː. inku ke seŋɽãː oɽoo-d͡ʑiː peɽeː, d͡ʑiːu reʔ enemako namaː kanaː oɽoo inku looːt̪e haɡeaː-woaː lekaː d͡ʑaɡara bakara laɡaːt̪ŋɡʔ.

=== English ===
Article 1: All human beings are born free and equal in dignity and rights. They are endowed with reason and conscience and should act towards one another in a spirit of brotherhood.

== Sources ==
- Anderson, Gregory D.S, ed. (2008). The Munda languages. Routledge Language Family Series 3. New York: Routledge. ISBN 0-415-32890-X.
