= Encyclopaedia Mundarica =

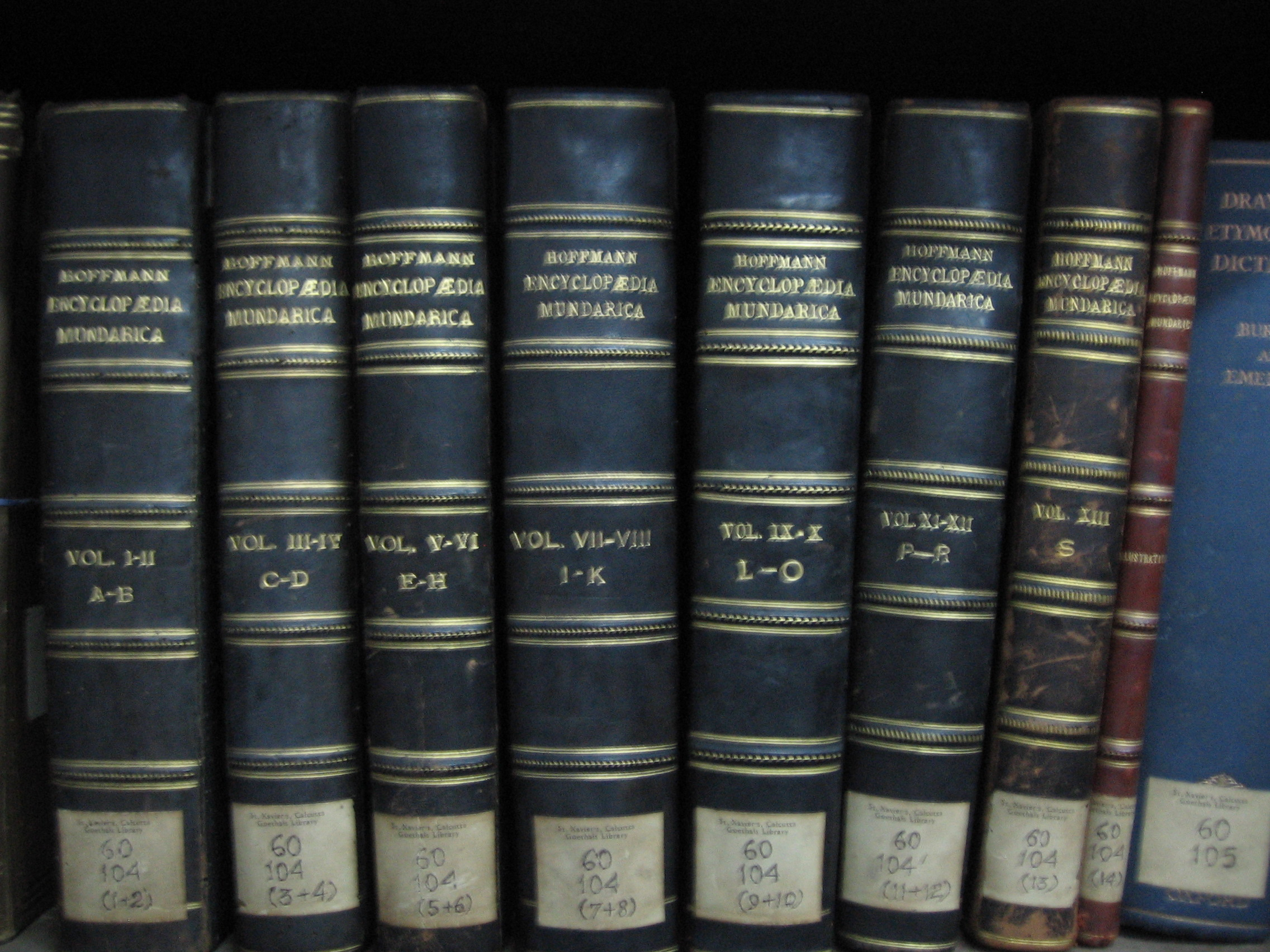
Spines of the work

Encyclopaedia Mundarica is a multi-volume work describing the language and culture of the Munda people of Chota Nagpur. The project was begun by Jesuit priest John Baptist Hoffmann and completed after Hoffmann's death by Arthur van Emelen. Hoffmann's contributions during his lifetime went into sixteen parts (sometimes listed as sixteen volumes but in reality just five). It was completed and published after his death with 13 volumes of text and 1 volume of plates between 1930 and 1950. The 48 plates in the last volume included illustrations of material culture made by Reverend Louis Cardon.
