= John-Baptist Hoffmann =

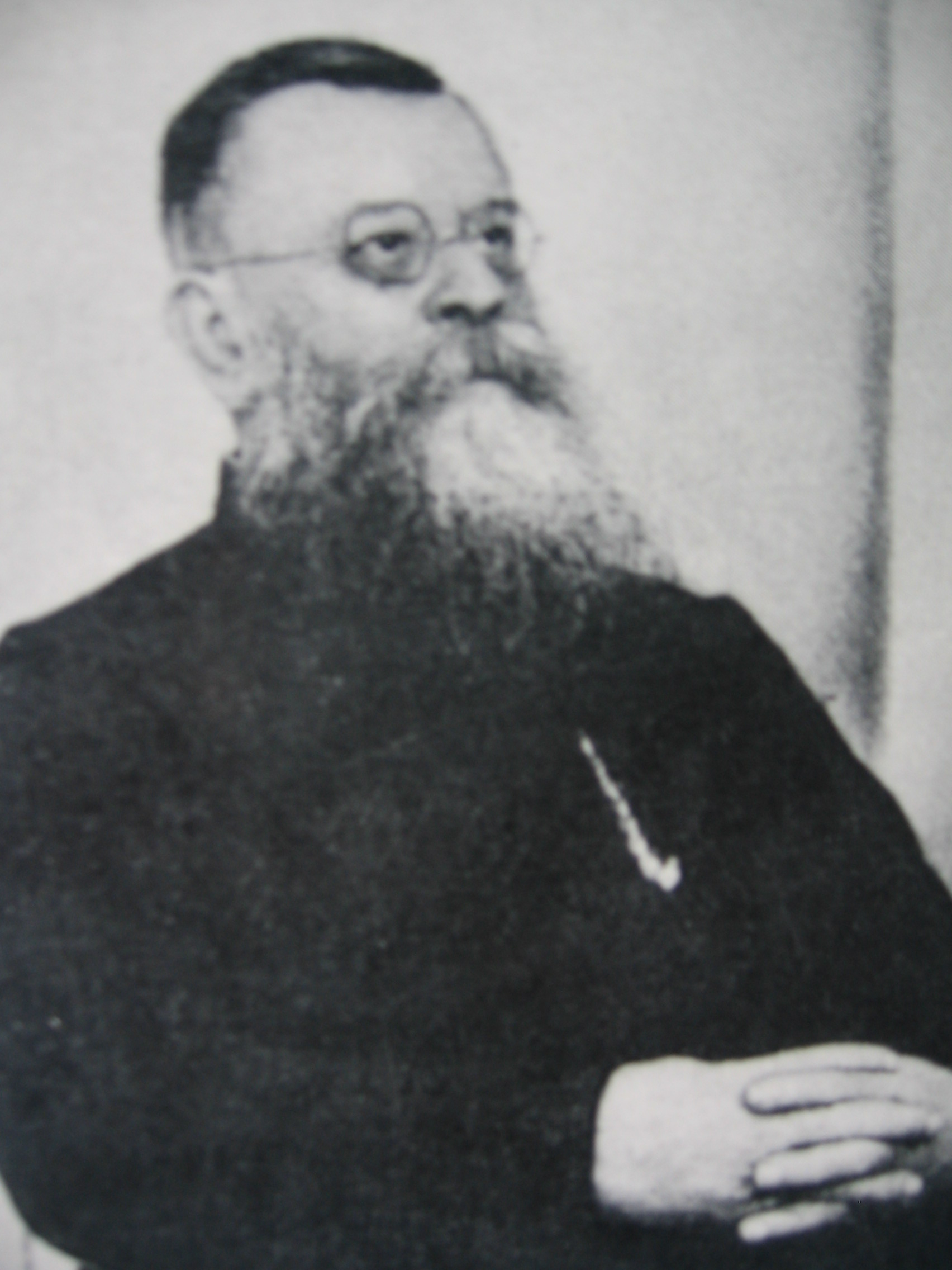
Hoffman

Johannes Baptist Hoffman (21 June 1857 – 19 November 1928), anglicized John-Baptist Hoffmann, was a German Jesuit linguist and missionary to the Mundas in India.

== Early life and training ==
Hoffman was born in Wallendorf, Germany. After completing his early schooling i, Echternach and Luxembourg, Hoffmann joined the Jesuit novitiate in Arlon (Belgium) in 1877. He was still a novice when he arrived in India at the end of the same year. Further training in Asansol (Philosophy and Theology) completed his priestly formation. He was ordained priest in Calcutta on 18 January 1891. Gifted in languages he had learned also French and English along with the Ancient Greek and Latin. He started studying the Mundari language and acquired also a more than superficial knowledge of Indian culture during his theological studies in Asansol.

== Among the tribals of Chotanagpur ==
Gifted as he was, Hoffmann was not a good professor. Attempts in Calcutta and Ranchi (St. John's High School, Ranchi) were not successful. He was asked then to study British and agrarian law in order to take Father Constant Lievens's succession in the legal defence of the tribals. In 1892 he moved into the tribal area, first in Khunti, Bandgaon then in Sarwada, the heartland of the Mundas (1895). There was much agitation at that time, against the landlords who, thanks to an inadequate British legal system were easily depriving the Mundas of their land.

=== Reforming the law ===
Hoffmann, with his knowledge of the language and customs of the Mundas (in particular their ancestral land rights) proposed to the authorities a scheme for a change of the law, that would respect and give legal weight to traditional (non-written) tribal law. It was clear to his eyes that most of the complaints made by the rebellion were legitimate. He was ultimately listened to and the Government of India initiate a survey of tribal land in 1902. Hoffmann was closely associated with the work done in the Khunti-Sarwada (Munda) area. All this painstaking work went into the Chotanagpur Tenancy Act of 1908, a landmark in tribal protective legislation. The Act is still in force in India today. Many of its articles were written by Hoffmann himself. His memorandum was even added as an explicative appendix.

=== The Cooperative Bank ===
After a stay in Germany (1907–1908) to recover a failing health, Hoffmann was back among the tribals. While in Germany he had studied the "Raffeisen Bank system", which he introduced in the Chota Nagpur Division in order to save the tribals from the clutches of the moneylenders. The exorbitant interest exacted from them was driving many to total ruin and destitution. For them Hoffmann started the Chotanagpur Catholic Cooperative Credit Society (1909), which grew out of the small monthly savings gathered in the "village circles" of the area. Much like the modern Grameen Bank of Mohammed Yunus, the system was based on village solidarity: the members themselves during a monthly meeting were deciding to whom loans should be given; they were also making sure that reimbursements were made by all. A "Cooperative store" was also started in 1913, where farmers could get at a reasonable price what they needed. Both initiatives were great success.

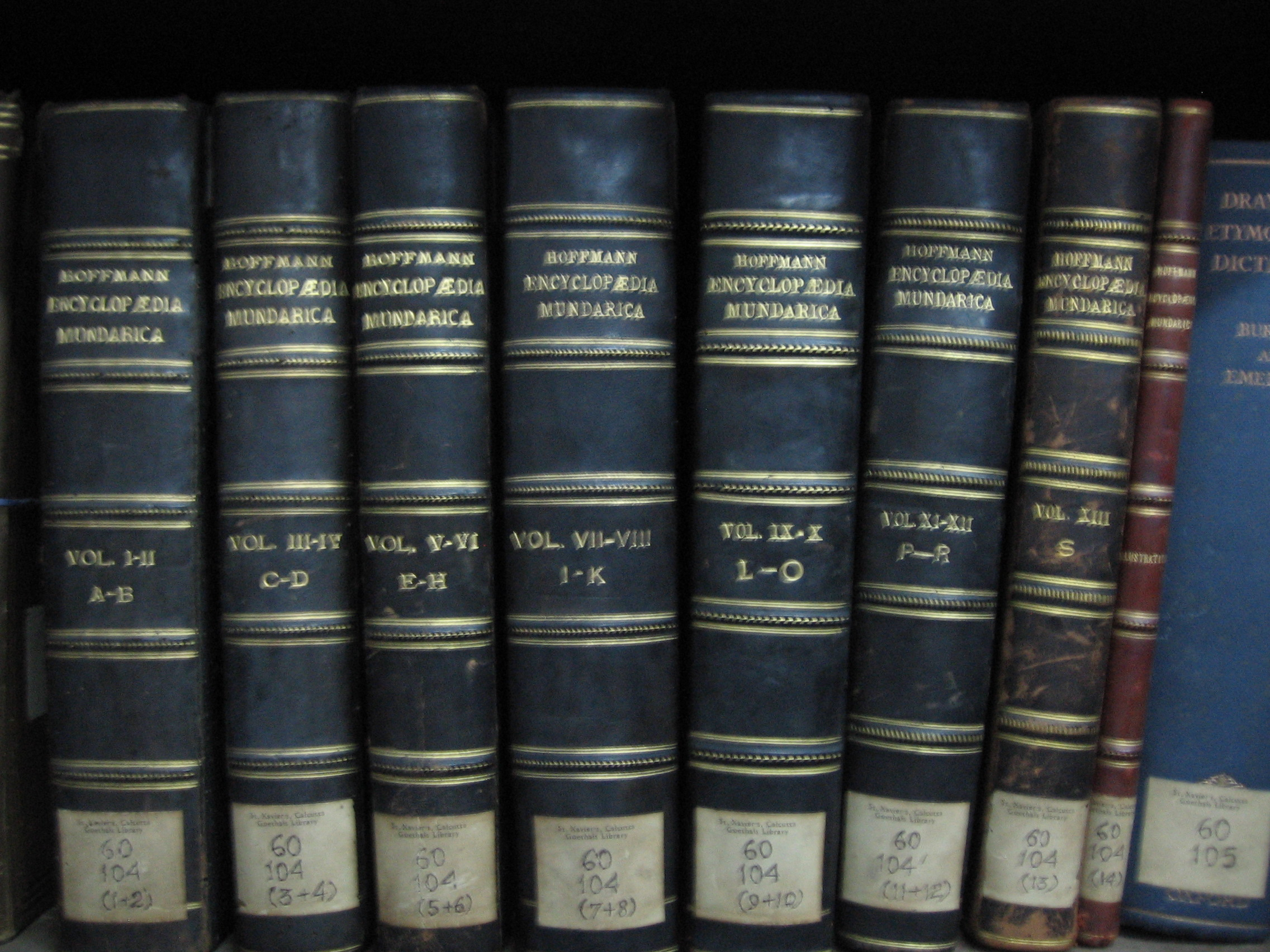
the 15 volumes of Hoffmann's 'Encyclopaedia Mundarica (1930-1937)

== The Encyclopaedia Mundarica ==
Hoffmann had already published a Mundari grammar (1903). A forced semi-retirement in Calcutta, because of poor health, gave him time to carry on collecting information, making studies on the Munda language, religion, culture, as well as its traditional social and political organization. When the First World War broke out, German citizens were expelled from British dominion areas. In 1915 Hoffmann was expelled and repatriated to Germany: a very sad experience for the sick missionary who however kept in touch with his Chotanagpur colleagues. Till the end of his life he went on working on his Mundari dictionary, wrote and organized his notes (with the help of Father van Emmelen). His Encyclopaedia Mundarica whose publication started soon after his death (18 November 1928 in Trier), is a monumental work of love: 15 volumes encompassing in its pages the whole culture and civilization of the Munda people.

== Main works ==
- Mundari Grammar, Calcutta, 1903.
- A Mundari Grammar with Exercises, 2 volumes, Calcutta 1905-1909.
- Mundari Poetry, Music and Dances, Calcutta: Baptist Press, 1907.
- Social work in Chota Nagpur, Calcutta 1909.
- Chota Nagpur Kotholik Bank. Calcutta: Catholic Orphan Press, 1910 (in Mundari with Latin script).
- Special Memorandum on the Land System of the Munda Country. Chota Nagpur Teancy Act of 1908 with notes, judicial rulings and the rules framed under the Act, ed. J. Reid Calcutta, 1910, 225-239.
- La bangue coopérative au Chota Nagpore. in: Missions Belges. 14 (Janvier, 1912) 31-38 & (Février, 1912) 51-62.
- Raiffeisenkassen im Dienste der indischen Mission, Xaverius Verlag, Aachen 1919.
- 37 Jahre in Indien, tröstliche Erfahrungen beim Naturvolk der Mundas., Tyrolia Verlag, Innsbruck 1923;
- Encyclopaedia Mundarica, 15 vol., Patna, 1930-37. Reprinted Patna 1975.
- Principles of Succession and Inheritance Among the Mundas, in: Man in India 4 (Dec. 1961), pp. 324–338, reprinted from: Journal of the Bihar and Orissa Research Society, Sept. 1915.
