= List of villages in Simdega district =

Simdega district is one of the 24 districts of Jharkhand state, India. This is the list of villages of Simdega district according to respective 10 blocks.

== Bano ==
List of villages in Bano block
Sl.	Name of panchayats	Name of villages
1	Badkaduel	Konap
1	Badkaduel	Loasokra
1	Badkaduel	Chhotkaduel
1	Badkaduel	Barkaduel
1	Badkaduel	Bingora
1	Badkaduel	Lamgarh
1	Badkaduel	Mayamsor
1	Badkaduel	Barerpa
1	Badkaduel	Kudrung
1	Badkaduel	Nawagaon
1	Badkaduel	Kusum
2	Banki	Paro
2	Banki	Konaroa
2	Banki	Banki
2	Banki	Ramjol
3	Bano	Bano
3	Bano	Samdega
4	Bera Ergi	Sumuibera
4	Bera Ergi	Binjamarcha
4	Bera Ergi	Bera Ergi
4	Bera Ergi	Olhan
4	Bera Ergi	Sutriuli
4	Bera Ergi	Buru Ergi
4	Bera Ergi	Rabai
5	Bintuka	Karkata
5	Bintuka	Jamur Soiya
5	Bintuka	Pangur
5	Bintuka	Sikrom
5	Bintuka	Bintuka
5	Bintuka	Kebetang
5	Bintuka	Turuyu
6	Dumariya	Marikel
6	Dumariya	Dumariya
6	Dumariya	Sotasoya
6	Dumariya	Urmu
7	Genmer	Chandsay
7	Genmer	Gerda
7	Genmer	Genmer
7	Genmer	Khijurbahar
7	Genmer	Toneya
8	Jamtai	Jorponda
8	Jamtai	Kohipat
8	Jamtai	Jorobari
8	Jamtai	Kenwgutu
8	Jamtai	Hurda
8	Jamtai	Jamtai
9	Kanarowan	Kanarowan
9	Kanarowan	Barumda
9	Kanarowan	Jarakel
10	Konsodey	Konsodey
10	Konsodey	Chhotketunga
10	Konsodey	Kuruchdega
10	Konsodey	Birta
10	Konsodey	Jaldega
10	Konsodey	Bujga
11	Pabura	Nimtur
11	Pabura	Bamulda
11	Pabura	Pabura
11	Pabura	Jamang
11	Pabura	Kenduda
11	Pabura	Chatuora
11	Pabura	Chodordah
12	Raikera	Biruli
12	Raikera	Marani
12	Raikera	Raikera
12	Raikera	Tembro
12	Raikera	Kanta
13	Sahubera	Sahubera
13	Sahubera	Hurpi
13	Sahubera	Hatinghore
13	Sahubera	Garra
13	Sahubera	Pohshar
13	Sahubera	Hatnahdah
13	Sahubera	Latakel
14	Simhatu	Jamtoli
14	Simhatu	Bandu
14	Simhatu	Ketka
14	Simhatu	Simhatu
14	Simhatu	Beroseta
15	Soy	Soy
15	Soy	Unikel
15	Soy	Ela
15	Soy	Mahabuang
15	Soy	Tinsogra
15	Soy	Sijang
15	Soy	Barbera
15	Soy	Kauwajor
16	Ukouli	Ukouli
16	Ukouli	Chorbandu
16	Ukouli	Sora
16	Ukouli	Chaklabasa
16	Ukouli	Buruhonjer
16	Ukouli	Sikorda

== Bansjore ==
List of villages in Bansjore block
Sl.	Name of panchayats	Name of villages
1	Bansjore	Dongapani
1	Bansjore	Bansjore
1	Bansjore	Bardega
2	Kombakera	Junadih
2	Kombakera	Bendochuan
2	Kombakera	Bongera
2	Kombakera	Kombakera
2	Kombakera	Bhanwarchaba
2	Kombakera	Robga
3	Targa	Targa
3	Targa	Patrapali
3	Targa	Bhukumunda
3	Targa	Sakambahar
3	Targa	Siharjor
3	Targa	Kulamara
3	Targa	Kurkura
4	Urtey	Ginikera
4	Urtey	Kachhupani
4	Urtey	Urtey

== Bolba ==
List of villages in Bolba block
Sl.	Name of panchayats	Name of villages
1	Behrinbasa	Palemunda
1	Behrinbasa	Kundurmunda
1	Behrinbasa	Behrinbasa
1	Behrinbasa	Naktikachhar
2	Kadopani	Kasira
2	Kadopani	Baleyajor
2	Kadopani	Gatigorha
2	Kadopani	Kadopani
2	Kadopani	Kiresera
3	Malsara	Khandanisan
3	Malsara	Machhkatta
3	Malsara	Malsara
3	Malsara	Letabera
3	Malsara	Suadonger
3	Malsara	Kachhupani
3	Malsara	Jettubandh
4	Pidiyaponch	Talmanga
4	Pidiyaponch	Belkuba
4	Pidiyaponch	Rengarbahar
4	Pidiyaponch	Pidiyaponch
4	Pidiyaponch	Auga
5	Samsera	Saraslongri
5	Samsera	Bolba
5	Samsera	Pakairbahar
5	Samsera	Alingburu
5	Samsera	Samsera

== Jaldega ==
List of villages in Jaldega block
Sl.	Name of panchayats	Name of villages
1	Jaldega	Mayamdega
1	Jaldega	Keluga
1	Jaldega	Tangia
1	Jaldega	Jaldega
1	Jaldega	Sawnajara
2	Konmerla	Bhundupani
2	Konmerla	Barkitangar
2	Konmerla	Kharwagarha
2	Konmerla	Tengratuku
2	Konmerla	Konmerla
2	Konmerla	Dumarbera
2	Konmerla	Gangutoli
2	Konmerla	Baldega
2	Konmerla	Kolomdega
3	Kutungiya	Pharsa
3	Kutungiya	Anai
3	Kutungiya	Telmingbera
3	Kutungiya	Dumarmunda
3	Kutungiya	Menjurgara
3	Kutungiya	Ramjari
3	Kutungiya	Kutungiya
4	Lamboi	Lamboi
5	Lamdega	Semariya
5	Lamdega	Lamdega
5	Lamdega	Hututua
5	Lamdega	Lamdega
5	Lamdega	Bhitbuna
5	Lamdega	Baraibera
5	Lamdega	Banjoga
6	Orga	Orga
6	Orga	Dhelsera
6	Orga	Sarubahar
7	Parba	Janoda
7	Parba	Bendosera
7	Parba	Seharmunda
7	Parba	Parba
7	Parba	Pomian
7	Parba	Dhengurpani
7	Parba	Sukhajhariya
7	Parba	Kauwadarha
7	Parba	Lachhanpur
7	Parba	Mangaspur
7	Parba	Dhauraanjan
8	Patiamba	Kharwagarha
8	Patiamba	Patiamba
8	Patiamba	Kinirkela
8	Patiamba	Karimati
9	Tati	Tonian
9	Tati	Tati
9	Tati	Phirka
9	Tati	Barbera
9	Tati	Paitano
9	Tati	Hutubda
9	Tati	Titling
9	Tati	Baribiringa
9	Tati	Turupdega
10	Tingina	Tikra
10	Tingina	Dhorhibahar
10	Tingina	Tingina
10	Tingina	Silanga

== Kersai ==
List of villages in Kersai block
Sl.	Name of panchayats	Name of villages
1	Baghdega	Raibera
1	Baghdega	Karrajharia
1	Baghdega	Baghdega
1	Baghdega	Konaskeli
1	Baghdega	Kusumdegi
1	Baghdega	Paharsara
2	Basen	Basen
2	Basen	Ghujhariya
2	Basen	Karangaguri
2	Basen	Karuarjor
3	Kersai	Karamtoli
3	Kersai	Kersai
3	Kersai	Karamtoli Alias Mahuatoli
4	Kinkel	Betma
4	Kinkel	Karaigura
4	Kinkel	Kinkel
5	Konjoba	Gariajor
5	Konjoba	Korkotjor
5	Konjoba	Konjoba
5	Konjoba	Pakartoli
6	Tainser East	Tainser
7	Tainser West	Tainser

== Kolebira ==
List of villages in Kolebira block
Sl.	Name of panchayats	Name of villages
1	Agharma	Larba
1	Agharma	Siwnathpur
1	Agharma	Dumardih
1	Agharma	Tangartoli
1	Agharma	Karamtoli
1	Agharma	Jurkela
1	Agharma	Agharma
2	Aidega	Aidega
2	Aidega	Pogloya
2	Aidega	Kalhatoli
2	Aidega	Ramjari
2	Aidega	Kudabera
3	Bandarchuwan	Durilari
3	Bandarchuwan	Setasoya
3	Bandarchuwan	Besrajara
3	Bandarchuwan	Selsoya
3	Bandarchuwan	Bandarchuwan
4	Barasloya	Kulasoya
4	Barasloya	Barketunga
4	Barasloya	Sijang
4	Barasloya	Barasloya
5	Domtoli	Domtoli
5	Domtoli	Ghansilari
5	Domtoli	Taisera
5	Domtoli	Barwadih
5	Domtoli	Kinbira
6	Kolebira	Kundurdega
6	Kolebira	Kolebira
6	Kolebira	Jamtoli
7	Lachragarh	Lachragarh
7	Lachragarh	Kumbakera
8	Nawatoli	Nawatoli
8	Nawatoli	Gobardhasa
8	Nawatoli	Sundratoli
8	Nawatoli	Machka
8	Nawatoli	Kadamtanr
8	Nawatoli	Saraipani
8	Nawatoli	Sarangapani
8	Nawatoli	Bhanwarpahar
9	Rainsiya	Bokba
9	Rainsiya	Takba
9	Rainsiya	Keyondpani
9	Rainsiya	Bongram
9	Rainsiya	Rainsiya
9	Rainsiya	Sirikonde Kera
10	Shahpur	Shahpur Kondekera
10	Shahpur	Konjoga
10	Shahpur	Kombakera
10	Shahpur	Lasia
11	Tutikel	Sokorla
11	Tutikel	Jhapla
11	Tutikel	Sardhatoli
11	Tutikel	Tutikel

== Kurdeg ==
List of villages in Kurdeg block
Sl.	Name of panchayats	Name of villages
1	Barkibuara	Barkibuara
1	Barkibuara	Labdera
2	Chadrimunda	Chadrimunda
2	Chadrimunda	Bangaon
2	Chadrimunda	Rengarbahar
3	Dumardih	Dumardih
3	Dumardih	Gatadih
3	Dumardih	Litimara
3	Dumardih	Kasdega
4	Gariyajor	Jhunka Chhapar
4	Gariyajor	Dhorhi
4	Gariyajor	Gariyajor
5	Hethma	Hethma
6	Khinda	Parkala
6	Khinda	Khinda
7	Kurdeg	Chhotkibiura
7	Kurdeg	Jhirkamunda
7	Kurdeg	Kurdeg
7	Kurdeg	Sarpmunda
7	Kurdeg	Khalijor
7	Kurdeg	Chhatakahu
8	Kutamakachchhar	Kokrachhera
8	Kutamakachchhar	Kutmakachchar
8	Kutamakachchhar	Patrapali
8	Kutamakachchhar	Daridih

== Pakartanr ==
List of villages in Pakartanr block
Sl.	Name of panchayats	Name of villages
1	Asanbera	Purnapani
1	Asanbera	Karamukha
1	Asanbera	Takba
1	Asanbera	Asanbera
1	Asanbera	Gondlipani
1	Asanbera	Bhundupani
1	Asanbera	Khanjaloya
2	Kairbera	Dumardih
2	Kairbera	Kinbira
2	Kairbera	Kairbera
2	Kairbera	Sarkhutoli
2	Kairbera	Masekera
3	Keshalpur	Rengapani
3	Keshalpur	Haldibera
3	Keshalpur	Kesalpur
3	Keshalpur	Nanesera
3	Keshalpur	Paledih
4	Krushkela	Katasaru
4	Krushkela	Sirupardhiya
4	Krushkela	Lailonga
4	Krushkela	Kurushkela
4	Krushkela	Serlonga
4	Krushkela	Ghaghra
4	Krushkela	Bhelwadih
4	Krushkela	Pahargurda
5	Pakartanr	Basatpur
5	Pakartanr	Kewanddih
5	Pakartanr	Kobang
5	Pakartanr	Pakartanr
6	Sikariyatanr	Sikariyatanr
6	Sikariyatanr	Sogra

== Simdega ==
List of villages in Simdega block
Sl.	Name of panchayats	Name of villages
1	Arani	Birkera
1	Arani	Barkatangar
1	Arani	Bindhantoli
1	Arani	Belkarcha
1	Arani	Phulwartangar
1	Arani	Jokari
1	Arani	Arani
1	Arani	Nawatoli
1	Arani	Pindatangar
2	Bara Barpani	Kudrung
2	Bara Barpani	Bhanwarpani
2	Bara Barpani	Chhotabarpani
2	Bara Barpani	Koleyadamar
2	Bara Barpani	Ghosra
2	Bara Barpani	Bara Barpani
3	Bangru	Bherikudar
3	Bangru	Bangru
3	Bangru	Pharsabera
3	Bangru	Khutitoli
3	Bangru	Madhuban
4	Biru	Japkakona
4	Biru	Biru
4	Biru	Akura
5	Garja	Baghlata
5	Garja	Garja
5	Garja	Kharwagarha
5	Garja	Kasaidohar
5	Garja	Tilma (Tilga)
5	Garja	Jamadohar
5	Garja	Katukona
5	Garja	Tirra
6	Jokbahar	Tholkobera
6	Jokbahar	Belgarh
6	Jokbahar	Jokbahar
6	Jokbahar	Muriya
7	Kochedega	Bendojor
7	Kochedega	Kochedega
7	Kochedega	Birkera
8	Kullukera	Hathabhanri
8	Kullukera	Kulukera
8	Kullukera	Kindardega
9	Pithra	Rigri
9	Pithra	Gulda
9	Pithra	Meromloya
9	Pithra	Barkichhapar
9	Pithra	Jamunakhar
9	Pithra	Tumdegi
9	Pithra	Semarbera
9	Pithra	Pithra
10	Sewai	Sewai
10	Sewai	Sansewai
11	Tainsera	Banabira
11	Tainsera	Dhengurjore Alias Chiarikani
11	Tainsera	Tainsera
11	Tainsera	Dumardih
12	Tamra	Chiksura
12	Tamra	Tabhadih
12	Tamra	Tamra
12	Tamra	Kamtara
12	Tamra	Konsera
12	Tamra	Danrgurda

== Thethaitangar ==
List of villages in Thethaitangar block
Sl.	Name of panchayats	Name of villages
1	Baghchatta	Konbegi
1	Baghchatta	Porhatoli
1	Baghchatta	Chidratoli
1	Baghchatta	Mundaltoli
1	Baghchatta	Barbera
1	Baghchatta	Baghchatta
1	Baghchatta	Lattakhaman
2	Bombalkera	Bombalkera
2	Bombalkera	Siringbera
3	Dumaki	Dhoribahar
3	Dumaki	Chetmal
3	Dumaki	Koronjo
3	Dumaki	Dumaki
3	Dumaki	Churiya
3	Dumaki	Kutniya
4	Ghutbahar	Ghutbahar
4	Ghutbahar	Binjhiyabandh
5	Joram	Joram
5	Joram	Ambapani
5	Joram	Jampani
6	Kerya	Deobahar
6	Kerya	Kerya
7	Konmenjara	Gamharjhariya
7	Konmenjara	Charmunda
7	Konmenjara	Konmenjara
7	Konmenjara	Siyandohar
7	Konmenjara	Kurpani
8	Konpala	Kongserabasar
8	Konpala	Konpala
9	Koromiyan	Japlanga
9	Koromiyan	Mararoma
9	Koromiyan	Kadamdih
9	Koromiyan	Karramunda
9	Koromiyan	Koromiyan
10	Meromdega	Tapudega Pandripani
10	Meromdega	Meromdega
11	Paikpara	Galsera
11	Paikpara	Paikpara
11	Paikpara	Deobahargindra
11	Paikpara	Rengari
12	Rajabasa	Pandripani
12	Rajabasa	Rajabasa
12	Rajabasa	Kesra
12	Rajabasa	Kahupani
12	Rajabasa	Semarkudar
13	Taraboga	Taraboga
13	Taraboga	Jilinga
13	Taraboga	Bhawnadeepa
13	Taraboga	Kurumdegi
13	Taraboga	Anwrabahar
14	Thethaitangar	Alsanga
14	Thethaitangar	Gargarbahar
14	Thethaitangar	Thethaitangar
15	Tukupani	Matrameta
15	Tukupani	Dhawaipani
15	Tukupani	Asanbera
15	Tukupani	Ranikudar
15	Tukupani	Jambahar
15	Tukupani	Kasdega
15	Tukupani	Tukupani Gurgurchuan
15	Tukupani	Pandripani

== See also ==
- Lists of villages in Jharkhand
