= List of villages in Seraikela Kharsawan district =

Seraikela Kharsawan district is one of the 24 districts of Jharkhand state, India. This is the list of villages of Seraikela Kharsawan district according to respective 9 blocks.

== Chandil ==
List of villages in Chandil block
Sl.	Name of panchayats	Name of villages
1	Asanbani	Asanbani
1	Asanbani	Kandarbeda
1	Asanbani	Ramgarh
1	Asanbani	Shaherbeda
2	Bhadudih	Badalakha
2	Bhadudih	Bhadudih
2	Bhadudih	Chotalakha
2	Bhadudih	Humid
2	Bhadudih	Humsada
2	Bhadudih	Jariyadih
2	Bhadudih	Manikui
3	Chandil	Chandil
3	Chandil	Kadamdih
3	Chandil	Sikli
4	Chilgu	Chakuliya
4	Chilgu	Chilgu
4	Chilgu	Kadamjhor
4	Chilgu	Karnidih
4	Chilgu	Kathjhor
4	Chilgu	Makulakocha
4	Chilgu	Tulin
5	Chowka	Berada
5	Chowka	Chandudih
5	Chowka	Chowka
5	Chowka	Dubrajpur
5	Chowka	Mirudih
5	Chowka	Royadih
5	Chowka	Tuidungri
6	Chowlibasa	Chowlibasa
6	Chowlibasa	Gourdih
6	Chowlibasa	Kashidih
6	Chowlibasa	Pathrakhun
6	Chowlibasa	Rugdi
6	Chowlibasa	Singati
7	Dhunaburu	Balidih
7	Dhunaburu	Bansa
7	Dhunaburu	Dhunaburu
7	Dhunaburu	Ghatdulmi
7	Dhunaburu	Jurgu
7	Dhunaburu	Kunchidih
7	Dhunaburu	Palgam
7	Dhunaburu	Paharpur
7	Dhunaburu	Tulgram
8	Ghoranegi	Borabinda
8	Ghoranegi	Dimudih
8	Ghoranegi	Ghoranegi
8	Ghoranegi	Keshargariya
9	Hensakocha	Hensakocha
9	Hensakocha	Kokebeda
9	Hensakocha	Mutuda
9	Hensakocha	Palna
9	Hensakocha	Rangamatia
9	Hensakocha	Ranka
9	Hensakocha	Tanisoya
9	Hensakocha	Turu
10	Jhabri	Dirlang
10	Jhabri	Janta
10	Jhabri	Jhabri
10	Jhabri	Lengdih
10	Jhabri	Padodih
10	Jhabri	Podka
10	Jhabri	Siddih
11	Kapali Northeast	Kapali
12	Kapali Northwest	Kapali
13	Kapali Southeast	Kapali
14	Kapali Southwest	Kapali
15	Khunti	Khunti
15	Khunti	Kurli
15	Khunti	Musribeda
16	Matkamdih	Barsida
16	Matkamdih	Chutiyakhal
16	Matkamdih	Dhowatama
16	Matkamdih	Gutiuli
16	Matkamdih	Kadlakocha
16	Matkamdih	Lapaibeda
16	Matkamdih	Matkamdih
16	Matkamdih	Raidih
16	Matkamdih	Reyarda
17	Rasuniya	Hathinada
17	Rasuniya	Kanglatand
17	Rasuniya	Lengdih
17	Rasuniya	Rasuniya
17	Rasuniya	Rawtada
17	Rasuniya	Ruwani
17	Rasuniya	Suksari
17	Rasuniya	Tiruldih
18	Ruchap	Gangudih
18	Ruchap	Hirimili
18	Ruchap	Ruchap
19	Rudiya	Chainpur
19	Rudiya	Dadda
19	Rudiya	Dalgram
19	Rudiya	Katiya
19	Rudiya	Pata
19	Rudiya	Rudiya
19	Rudiya	Saherbeda
19	Rudiya	Tarkuang
20	Tamuliya	Dobo
20	Tamuliya	Gouri
20	Tamuliya	Pudisili
20	Tamuliya	Rugdi
20	Tamuliya	Tamuliya
21	Urmal	Dinai
21	Urmal	Dubudih
21	Urmal	Dungardih
21	Urmal	Hedemda
21	Urmal	Urmal

== Adityapur (Gamharia) ==
List of villages in Adityapur (Gamharia) block
Sl.	Name of panchayats	Name of villages
1	Bandhdih	Baliposi
1	Bandhdih	Bandhdih
1	Bandhdih	Bhalubasa
1	Bandhdih	Dadimara
1	Bandhdih	Dalaikocha
1	Bandhdih	Dighi
1	Bandhdih	Haldibani
1	Bandhdih	Hardala
1	Bandhdih	Jhapragoda
1	Bandhdih	Nuadih
1	Bandhdih	Ramchandrapur
1	Bandhdih	Singhpur
1	Bandhdih	Thasakpur
2	Barakankra	Barakankra
2	Barakankra	Brahmatand
2	Barakankra	Chandrapur
2	Barakankra	Chotakankra
2	Barakankra	Dhatkidih
2	Barakankra	Gorangdih
2	Barakankra	Gunadih
2	Barakankra	Jagannathpur
2	Barakankra	Madhupur
2	Barakankra	Matadih
2	Barakankra	Nilmohanpur
2	Barakankra	Nishakur
2	Barakankra	Nuadih
2	Barakankra	Padadih
2	Barakankra	Rengodih
2	Barakankra	Sahebganj
2	Barakankra	Timniya
3	Birbansh	Baliguma
3	Birbansh	Bholadih
3	Birbansh	Birbansh
3	Birbansh	Chauda
3	Birbansh	Gopidih
3	Birbansh	Jambeda
3	Birbansh	Kamalpur
3	Birbansh	Kendudih
3	Birbansh	Khakudih
3	Birbansh	Nimaidih
3	Birbansh	Nischintpur
3	Birbansh	Pathargoda
3	Birbansh	Tirildih
4	Burudih	Barabaramari
4	Burudih	Baridih
4	Burudih	Burudih
4	Burudih	Champanagar
4	Burudih	Chotabaramari
4	Burudih	Kanki
4	Burudih	Karangiribuda
4	Burudih	Manipur
4	Burudih	Raymara
4	Burudih	Regadih
4	Burudih	Reyarda
4	Burudih	Salampathar
4	Burudih	Santhaldih
4	Burudih	Shivpur
4	Burudih	Sridharpur
4	Burudih	Sudhapur
5	Chamaru	Chamaru
5	Chamaru	Guda
5	Chamaru	Nengtasai
5	Chamaru	Rangamatia
5	Chamaru	Rangatand
5	Chamaru	Ujanpur
6	Chota Gamharia	Chota Gamharia
7	Dudra	Dhatkidih
7	Dudra	Dudra
7	Dudra	Gilinggoda
7	Dudra	Kamalpur
7	Dudra	Kumari
7	Dudra	Mahuldih
7	Dudra	Parvatipur
8	Dugdha	Bada Hariharpur
8	Dugdha	Badkatand
8	Dugdha	Burubad
8	Dugdha	Chota Hariharpur
8	Dugdha	Dugdha
8	Dugdha	Gahnadih
8	Dugdha	Haridih
8	Dugdha	Jagannathpur
8	Dugdha	Jhadgovindpur
8	Dugdha	Jhurkuli
8	Dugdha	Khuchidih
8	Dugdha	Pratappur
8	Dugdha	Ramjivanpur
8	Dugdha	Shikhardih
8	Dugdha	Srirampur
8	Dugdha	Swarupdih
8	Dugdha	Virajpur
8	Dugdha	Virdhwajpur
9	Dugni	Dugni
9	Dugni	Jambahal
9	Dugni	Jordih
9	Dugni	Khudidih
10	Dumra	Baidhnathpur
10	Dumra	Barikocha
10	Dumra	Beltand
10	Dumra	Bhdawagora
10	Dumra	Bishrampur
10	Dumra	Dumra
10	Dumra	Gidibera
10	Dumra	Gopinathpur
10	Dumra	Gutubera
10	Dumra	Hatibhanja
10	Dumra	Jagibad
10	Dumra	Kudibera
10	Dumra	Mahtabera
10	Dumra	Manoharpur
10	Dumra	Pandubera
10	Dumra	Raghunathpur
10	Dumra	Raipur
10	Dumra	Ratanpur
10	Dumra	Udaypur
11	Itagarh	Aamdih
11	Itagarh	Baistamdih
11	Itagarh	Basurda
11	Itagarh	Itagarh
11	Itagarh	Kuludih
11	Itagarh	Tirildih
11	Itagarh	Tirla
12	Jagannathpur	Balrampur
12	Jagannathpur	Jagannathpur
12	Jagannathpur	Narayanpur
13	Jaikan	Adityapratappur
13	Jaikan	Bada Jamjoda
13	Jaikan	Bandih
13	Jaikan	Chota Jamjoda
13	Jaikan	Daraimach
13	Jaikan	Jaikan
13	Jaikan	Shobhapur
13	Jaikan	Ukam
13	Jaikan	Vamandungri
13	Jaikan	Vindapur
14	Kalikapur	Forest block
14	Kalikapur	Kalikapur
14	Kalikapur	Saldih
14	Kalikapur	Shankarpur
14	Kalikapur	Uperbeda
15	Kandra	Kandra
16	Muria	Chandrapur
16	Muria	Hathitand
16	Muria	Jivanpur
16	Muria	Kolabira
16	Muria	Masleva
16	Muria	Muria
16	Muria	Saldih
17	Narayanpur	Asanbani
17	Narayanpur	Donda
17	Narayanpur	Ghaghi
17	Narayanpur	Narayanpur
17	Narayanpur	Ramnagar
17	Narayanpur	Simalbeda
17	Narayanpur	Vijay
18	Nuagarh	Banslikocha
18	Nuagarh	Dhatkidih
18	Nuagarh	Nayadih
18	Nuagarh	Nuagarh
18	Nuagarh	Pogrodih
18	Nuagarh	Samram
18	Nuagarh	Ujjawalpur
19	Rapcha	Bakipur
19	Rapcha	Bikanipur
19	Rapcha	Harisundarpur
19	Rapcha	Mohanpur
19	Rapcha	Murgaghutu
19	Rapcha	Musrikudar
19	Rapcha	Padampur
19	Rapcha	Pendrabera
19	Rapcha	Ramchandrapur
19	Rapcha	Rapcha
19	Rapcha	Tilopada
20	Tentoposi	Awanladih
20	Tentoposi	Begnadih
20	Tentoposi	Dubrajpur
20	Tentoposi	Goira
20	Tentoposi	Hidibili
20	Tentoposi	Sindhuchopa
20	Tentoposi	Tentoposi
20	Tentoposi	Tiringtipa
20	Tentoposi	Ugma
21	Yashpur	Gangia
21	Yashpur	Mundrubeda
21	Yashpur	Mudkum
21	Yashpur	Pakudgoda
21	Yashpur	Raimasa
21	Yashpur	Rajgaon
21	Yashpur	Udaypur
21	Yashpur	Yashpur

== Ichagarh ==
List of villages in Ichagarh block
Sl.	Name of panchayats	Name of villages
1	Bandu	Bandu
1	Bandu	Chamda
1	Bandu	Hurlung
1	Bandu	Jamdoha
1	Bandu	Karandih
1	Bandu	Kuduktopa
1	Bandu	Udal
2	Chimtiya	Atargram
2	Chimtiya	Chimtiya
2	Chimtiya	Chitri
2	Chimtiya	Diyadih
2	Chimtiya	Khokra
2	Chimtiya	Rugri
2	Chimtiya	Tamara
3	Dewaltand	Agsiya
3	Dewaltand	Bamandih
3	Dewaltand	Basahatu
3	Dewaltand	Dewaltand
3	Dewaltand	Jelingadar
3	Dewaltand	Nawadih
3	Dewaltand	Rugdi
4	Gourangkocha	Dalgram
4	Gourangkocha	Gourangkocha
4	Gourangkocha	Kathghoda
4	Gourangkocha	Salbani
4	Gourangkocha	Silda
5	Gudri	Bada Amda
5	Gudri	Chota Amda
5	Gudri	Gudri
5	Gudri	Hundi
5	Gudri	Hutup
6	Lepatand	Budalong
6	Lepatand	Ghatiya
6	Lepatand	Ghatshila
6	Lepatand	Kandebeda
6	Lepatand	Kestopur
6	Lepatand	Kundrilong
6	Lepatand	Lepatand
6	Lepatand	Patpur
7	Maisda	Burudih
7	Maisda	Garadih
7	Maisda	Kadka
7	Maisda	Kalichamda
7	Maisda	Lepsodih
7	Maisda	Maisda
7	Maisda	Matkamdih
7	Maisda	Purandih
8	Nadisai	Amandiri
8	Nadisai	Chodiyadih
8	Nadisai	Daruda
8	Nadisai	Ghagri
8	Nadisai	Gudma
8	Nadisai	Kutam
8	Nadisai	Nadisai
8	Nadisai	Naro
8	Nadisai	Shankaradih
9	Patkum	Baksai
9	Patkum	Ichagarh
9	Patkum	Kujamban
9	Patkum	Patkum
9	Patkum	Wakaltodiya
10	Situ	Dumra
10	Situ	Hartaldih
10	Situ	Kutam
10	Situ	Raghunathpur
10	Situ	Rahradih
10	Situ	Salukdih
10	Situ	Situ
11	Sodo	Adardih
11	Sodo	Bamandih
11	Sodo	Birdih
11	Sodo	Govindpur
11	Sodo	Khiri
11	Sodo	Kuramdih
11	Sodo	Paharpur
11	Sodo	Sodo
12	Tikar	Bankati
12	Tikar	Burudih
12	Tikar	Dumardih
12	Tikar	Jaragoda
12	Tikar	Pamiya
12	Tikar	Ratie
12	Tikar	Saparup
12	Tikar	Serengdih
12	Tikar	Tikar
13	Tiruldih 2	Baruna
13	Tiruldih 2	Boda
13	Tiruldih 2	Chipdi
13	Tiruldih 2	Chunidih
13	Tiruldih 2	Dhundadih
13	Tiruldih 2	Lava
13	Tiruldih 2	Tiruldih
14	Tuta	Arua
14	Tuta	Badachunchudia
14	Tuta	Baradih
14	Tuta	Bardadih
14	Tuta	Choga
14	Tuta	Chotachunchudia
14	Tuta	Dulmidih
14	Tuta	Kuidih
14	Tuta	Matkamdih
14	Tuta	Pudihensa
14	Tuta	Tuta

== Kharsawan ==
List of villages in Kharsawan block
Sl.	Name of panchayats	Name of villages
1	Badaamda	Badaamda
1	Badaamda	Bandubeda
1	Badaamda	Buditopa
1	Badaamda	Chotaamda
1	Badaamda	Narayanpur
1	Badaamda	Sargaposi
1	Badaamda	Tiringtipa
1	Badaamda	Udalkham
2	Bitapur	Barjudih
2	Bitapur	Bitapur
2	Bitapur	Dirigoda
2	Bitapur	Jhujhki
2	Bitapur	Kadambeda
2	Bitapur	Kashidih
2	Bitapur	Kondadih
2	Bitapur	Kotadih
2	Bitapur	Narayandih
2	Bitapur	Nuabeda
2	Bitapur	Raghunathpur
2	Bitapur	Raidih
2	Bitapur	Saharbeda
2	Bitapur	Sidmakudar
2	Bitapur	Silpingda
3	Burudih	Asura
3	Burudih	Begnadih
3	Burudih	Burudih
3	Burudih	Devli
3	Burudih	Ganjudih
3	Burudih	Guabeda
3	Burudih	Kolburudih
3	Burudih	Mahalisai
3	Burudih	Potka
3	Burudih	Rengogora
3	Burudih	Rudrapur
4	Chilku	Badgaon
4	Chilku	Baghraidih
4	Chilku	Balrampur
4	Chilku	Burughutu
4	Chilku	Chilku
4	Chilku	Sandeburu
4	Chilku	Santari
5	Dalaikela	Asantalia
5	Dalaikela	Badamashal
5	Dalaikela	Banaikela
5	Dalaikela	Dalaikela
5	Dalaikela	Hindusai
5	Dalaikela	Khudipidih
5	Dalaikela	Kuchai
5	Dalaikela	Mauda
5	Dalaikela	Pidki
5	Dalaikela	Santoshpur
5	Dalaikela	Tirildih
6	Haribhanja	Haribhanja
6	Haribhanja	Khegurda
6	Haribhanja	Khelarisai
6	Haribhanja	Pundida
6	Haribhanja	Ramgarh
6	Haribhanja	Sorang
6	Haribhanja	Tankodih
6	Haribhanja	Teligoda
7	Jojodih	Ananddih
7	Jojodih	Badasai
7	Jojodih	Baidhnathpur
7	Jojodih	Borda
7	Jojodih	Devridih
7	Jojodih	Dharamdih
7	Jojodih	Gopinathpur
7	Jojodih	Jojodih
7	Jojodih	Kotwalsai
7	Jojodih	Mailadih
7	Jojodih	Padampur
7	Jojodih	Parmadih
7	Jojodih	Telisai
8	Jordiha	Badabambo
8	Jordiha	Badasupaisai
8	Jordiha	Chotabambo
8	Jordiha	Gitilata
8	Jordiha	Gondamara
8	Jordiha	Jordiha
8	Jordiha	Kotwalsai
8	Jordiha	Rugdi
8	Jordiha	Samursai
8	Jordiha	Sonapose
8	Jordiha	Telangjudi
9	Kharsawan (Old ULB)	Kadamdiha (Old Ward-6)
9	Kharsawan (Old ULB)	Kharsawan (Old Ward 1-5)
10	Krishnapur	Gopalpur
10	Krishnapur	Jagtapur
10	Krishnapur	Khamardih
10	Krishnapur	Kocha
10	Krishnapur	Krishnapur
10	Krishnapur	Kudasingi
10	Krishnapur	Kuntala
10	Krishnapur	Nichintpur
10	Krishnapur	Potobeda
10	Krishnapur	Rajabasa
10	Krishnapur	Udhadia
11	Riding	Hudangda
11	Riding	Lakhandih
11	Riding	Mudadih
11	Riding	Narayanbeda
11	Riding	Patpat
11	Riding	Raijama
11	Riding	Riding
12	Simla	Baddih
12	Simla	Baniram
12	Simla	Chamrudih
12	Simla	Gondpur
12	Simla	Gopidih
12	Simla	Gullupada
12	Simla	Hadisai
12	Simla	Hansda
12	Simla	Jarkatola
12	Simla	Katua
12	Simla	Nayadih
12	Simla	Podadih
12	Simla	Simla
13	Telaidih	Badakudma
13	Telaidih	Badasargidih
13	Telaidih	Chotasargidih
13	Telaidih	Jenasai
13	Telaidih	Jojokudma
13	Telaidih	Losodiki
13	Telaidih	Mahadevbuta
13	Telaidih	Pitkalang
13	Telaidih	Singadih
13	Telaidih	Telaidih

== Kuchai ==
List of villages in Kuchai block
Sl.	Name of panchayats	Name of villages
1	Arwan	Arwan
1	Arwan	Bayang
1	Arwan	Dhatkidih
1	Arwan	Doro
1	Arwan	Jilingda
1	Arwan	Jorasarjam
1	Arwan	Kerketa
1	Arwan	Lopta
1	Arwan	Mangudih
1	Arwan	Serengda
2	Bandolohar	Badachakri
2	Bandolohar	Bagurdih
2	Bandolohar	Bandolohar
2	Bandolohar	Chotachakri
2	Bandolohar	Nowagaon
2	Bandolohar	Parulbadi
2	Bandolohar	Putuldih
2	Bandolohar	Rurunglohar
3	Baruhatu	Bandhdih
3	Baruhatu	Baruhatu
3	Baruhatu	Dalbhanga
3	Baruhatu	Dedawapahad
3	Baruhatu	Jojohatu
3	Baruhatu	Padeya
3	Baruhatu	Sursi
3	Baruhatu	Todangdih
4	Chotasegoi	Badabandi
4	Chotasegoi	Badasegoi
4	Chotasegoi	Champad
4	Chotasegoi	Chotabandi
4	Chotasegoi	Chotasegoi
4	Chotasegoi	Damadiri
4	Chotasegoi	Gufa
4	Chotasegoi	Ichahatu
4	Chotasegoi	Jamda
4	Chotasegoi	Karalor
4	Chotasegoi	Punibudi
4	Chotasegoi	Raisindri
4	Chotasegoi	Torangdih
5	Gomiadih	Gomiadih
5	Gomiadih	Hatnabeda
5	Gomiadih	Ichadih
5	Gomiadih	Kanderago
5	Gomiadih	Korvadih
5	Gomiadih	Kudadih
5	Gomiadih	Mermangja
5	Gomiadih	Selaidih
5	Gomiadih	Vadu
5	Gomiadih	Zenalongbasidih
6	Maranghatu	Bhukunda
6	Maranghatu	Dango
6	Maranghatu	Jobzanzeer
6	Maranghatu	Kuchai
6	Maranghatu	Kundiamarcha
6	Maranghatu	Maranghatu
6	Maranghatu	Ramaisal
6	Maranghatu	Rengadih
6	Maranghatu	Rengsa
6	Maranghatu	Ruchab
7	Pondakata	Chirudih
7	Pondakata	Durusai
7	Pondakata	Kolaidih
7	Pondakata	Kujadih
7	Pondakata	Mundadev
7	Pondakata	Pondakata
8	Rolahatu	Atara
8	Rolahatu	Baugutu
8	Rolahatu	Buruhatu
8	Rolahatu	Dangil
8	Rolahatu	Gilwa
8	Rolahatu	Jombaro
8	Rolahatu	Kasrauli
8	Rolahatu	Komay
8	Rolahatu	Kora
8	Rolahatu	Ludubera
8	Rolahatu	Punisir
8	Rolahatu	Rolahatu
8	Rolahatu	Sikramba
8	Rolahatu	Taraamba
9	Rugudih	Bijar
9	Rugudih	Dhunadih
9	Rugudih	Mutugota
9	Rugudih	Ramdih
9	Rugudih	Rochoda
9	Rugudih	Rugudih
9	Rugudih	Siyadih
9	Rugudih	Sosokoda
10	Tilopada	Dukhyadih
10	Tilopada	Galudih
10	Tilopada	Gongamarcha
10	Tilopada	Gopidih
10	Tilopada	Gumdadih
10	Tilopada	Jugidih
10	Tilopada	Lepso
10	Tilopada	Pagardih
10	Tilopada	Rengadih
10	Tilopada	Samudih
10	Tilopada	Surabeda
10	Tilopada	Tilopada

== Kukru ==
List of villages in Kukru block
Sl.	Name of panchayats	Name of villages
1	Berasisirum	Berasisirum
1	Berasisirum	Rupru
2	Chaura	Chaura
2	Chaura	Kuda
2	Chaura	Pandra
3	Ichadih	Adardih
3	Ichadih	Chowka
3	Ichadih	Edaldih
3	Ichadih	Ichadih
3	Ichadih	Karkidih
3	Ichadih	Wakarkudi
4	Janum	Hesalong
4	Janum	Janum
4	Janum	Kendaanda
4	Janum	Khudilong
4	Janum	Samnagar
5	Kukru	Chotalapang
5	Kukru	Datam
5	Kukru	Kukru
5	Kukru	Shishi
6	Letemda	Badalapang
6	Letemda	Bandabir
6	Letemda	Jargo
6	Letemda	Letemda
7	Odia	Dayapur
7	Odia	Dulmi
7	Odia	Kumari
7	Odia	Odia
7	Odia	Udatand
8	Pargama	Chupchudia
8	Pargama	Haitirul
8	Pargama	Kadargama
8	Pargama	Kadka
8	Pargama	Kisundih
8	Pargama	Pargama
8	Pargama	Sindurpur
9	Tiruldih 1	Chano
9	Tiruldih 1	Dere
9	Tiruldih 1	Gundlidih
9	Tiruldih 1	Hedemuli
9	Tiruldih 1	Sapada
9	Tiruldih 1	Saparum
9	Tiruldih 1	Sirkadih
9	Tiruldih 1	Tiruldih

== Nimdih ==
List of villages in Nimdih block
Sl.	Name of panchayats	Name of villages
1	Badeda	Badeda
1	Badeda	Burudih
1	Badeda	Madhupur
2	Chaliyama	Bandhdih
2	Chaliyama	Chaliyama
2	Chaliyama	Damudih
2	Chaliyama	Farega
2	Chaliyama	Pathardih
3	Chigraparkidih	Chatarma
3	Chigraparkidih	Chigraparkidih
3	Chigraparkidih	Hudrupathardih
3	Chigraparkidih	Jugilang
4	Gordih	Gordih
4	Gordih	Gauridih
4	Gordih	Ghutiyadih
4	Gordih	Ketunga
4	Gordih	Nimdih
4	Gordih	Sangira
5	Gunda	Gunda
5	Gunda	Lava
5	Gunda	Ramnagar
5	Gunda	Seema
6	Heven	Anda
6	Heven	Heven
6	Heven	Hutu
6	Heven	Kalyanpur
6	Heven	Kasipur
6	Heven	Muragdih
7	Adardih	Adardih
7	Adardih	Raghunathpur
8	Jhimri	Jhimri
8	Jhimri	Muru
9	Lakri	Bagdi
9	Lakri	Bandu
9	Lakri	Burudih
9	Lakri	Kadla
9	Lakri	Lakri
9	Lakri	Puriyara
10	Lupungdih	Bana
10	Lupungdih	Batkamkocha
10	Lupungdih	Burudungri
10	Lupungdih	Lupung
10	Lupungdih	Pitki
10	Lupungdih	Tankocha
10	Lupungdih	Ugdih
11	Samanpur	Bamni
11	Samanpur	Hakasara
11	Samanpur	Hurlung
11	Samanpur	Makula
11	Samanpur	Purnapani
11	Samanpur	Samanpur
12	Tengadih	Aotosimal
12	Tengadih	Badhadih
12	Tengadih	Janta
12	Tengadih	Jharidih
12	Tengadih	Kamadulu
12	Tengadih	Rupadih
12	Tengadih	Tengadih
12	Tengadih	Tetlo
13	Tilla	Kushputul
13	Tilla	Sirka
13	Tilla	Tilla

== Gobindpur (Rajnagar) ==
List of villages in Gobindpur (Rajnagar) block
Sl.	Name of panchayats	Name of villages
1	Bada Sijulata	Bada Sijulata
1	Bada Sijulata	Bahadurganj
1	Bada Sijulata	Chota Sijulata
1	Bada Sijulata	Dangardiha
1	Bada Sijulata	Govardhan
1	Bada Sijulata	Jambani
1	Bada Sijulata	Pata Hensalbil
1	Bada Sijulata	Phukdih
1	Bada Sijulata	Rampur
1	Bada Sijulata	Urughutu
2	Bana	Bada Kanki
2	Bana	Bana
2	Bana	Chota Kanki
2	Bana	Gopalpur
2	Bana	Hamanda
2	Bana	Jota
2	Bana	Kolabadhia
2	Bana	Kunwarda
2	Bana	Mundakanti
2	Bana	Sangajota
2	Bana	Tangrain
2	Bana	Tipangtand
3	Bandu	Bandu
3	Bandu	Barubeda
3	Bandu	Budhisiring
3	Bandu	Gondamara
3	Bandu	Jamdih
3	Bandu	Keshargadhia
3	Bandu	Khandadera
3	Bandu	Kotarichara
3	Bandu	Maharajganj
3	Bandu	Patakocha
3	Bandu	Richituka
3	Bandu	Ravankocha
4	Dhuripada	Chakradharpur
4	Dhuripada	Choudadih
4	Dhuripada	Devrajpur
4	Dhuripada	Dhuripada
4	Dhuripada	Hanumanbeda
4	Dhuripada	Letotiril
4	Dhuripada	Phuljhadi
5	Dumardih	Bankati
5	Dumardih	Baridih
5	Dumardih	Burudih
5	Dumardih	Chapda
5	Dumardih	Chelkhani
5	Dumardih	Dumardiha
5	Dumardih	Lachmipur
5	Dumardih	Lakhiposi
5	Dumardih	Mahuldih
5	Dumardih	Nishintpur
5	Dumardih	Radhanagar
5	Dumardih	Sanjad
5	Dumardih	Sargachida
5	Dumardih	Vikrampur
6	Edal	Bahmankutum
6	Edal	Dumardiha
6	Edal	Edal
6	Edal	Golokutum
6	Edal	Hensal
6	Edal	Natairuli
6	Edal	Pathrikutum
6	Edal	Rupanachna
6	Edal	Sonardih
7	Gamharia	Baghraisai
7	Gamharia	Baliasai
7	Gamharia	Chadri
7	Gamharia	Gajidih
7	Gamharia	Gamharia
7	Gamharia	Jarkani
7	Gamharia	Kadko
7	Gamharia	Majhgaon
7	Gamharia	Nauka
7	Gamharia	Pandugiti
7	Gamharia	Salgadiha
8	Gengeruli	Badakudar
8	Gengeruli	Bada Kunabeda
8	Gengeruli	Bharatpur
8	Gengeruli	Chouberbandha
8	Gengeruli	Gangadih
8	Gengeruli	Gengeruli
8	Gengeruli	Khairkocha
8	Gengeruli	Matunkbeda
8	Gengeruli	Sadadih
8	Gengeruli	Sosodih
8	Gengeruli	Tuibasa
9	Gobindpur	Amlatola
9	Gobindpur	Bandu
9	Gobindpur	Bankati
9	Gobindpur	Bogadadu
9	Gobindpur	Gobindpur
9	Gobindpur	Khairbani
9	Gobindpur	Khokhro
9	Gobindpur	Nayasai
9	Gobindpur	Rutdih
10	Herma	Chotagidhi
10	Herma	Dholadih
10	Herma	Gulia
10	Herma	Hathisiring
10	Herma	Herma
10	Herma	Jadudih
10	Herma	Kita
10	Herma	Sagadia
10	Herma	Shyamsundarpur
10	Herma	Sini
10	Herma	Sonaposi
11	Jonbani	Amlatola
11	Jonbani	Autodih
11	Jonbani	Badagidhi
11	Jonbani	Bhalupani
11	Jonbani	Dhanudih
11	Jonbani	Jhalak
11	Jonbani	Jonbani
11	Jonbani	Rajabasa
11	Jonbani	Sedesai
11	Jonbani	Sitani
11	Jonbani	Visrampur
12	Jumal	Badakadal
12	Jumal	Chotakadal
12	Jumal	Ichamara
12	Jumal	Itapokhar
12	Jumal	Jumal
12	Jumal	Muchiasai
12	Jumal	Roladih
12	Jumal	Sundardih
12	Jumal	Tiasara
13	Katanga	Bandua
13	Katanga	Bhurkuli
13	Katanga	Burudih
13	Katanga	Chotadawna
13	Katanga	Dholadih
13	Katanga	Gangidih
13	Katanga	Katanga
13	Katanga	Kumrasol
13	Katanga	Midki
13	Katanga	Puha
13	Katanga	Suriyaposi
13	Katanga	Ulidih
13	Katanga	Upersila
14	Kendmundi	Balrampur
14	Kendmundi	Batarbeda
14	Kendmundi	Bedkalsai
14	Kendmundi	Bidri
14	Kendmundi	Bisrampur
14	Kendmundi	Chota Kunabeda
14	Kendmundi	Kendmundi
14	Kendmundi	Majhgaon
14	Kendmundi	Padnamsai
14	Kendmundi	Salbani
14	Kendmundi	Sosomali
14	Kendmundi	Tangarjoda
15	Kuju	Baddih
15	Kuju	Balidih
15	Kuju	Bandodih
15	Kuju	Banksai
15	Kuju	Chandankhiri
15	Kuju	Dangardiha
15	Kuju	Devridih
15	Kuju	Hensal
15	Kuju	Icha
15	Kuju	Kelugot
15	Kuju	Kuju
15	Kuju	Kumdih
15	Kuju	Mahuldih
15	Kuju	Majhgaon
15	Kuju	Nimdih
15	Kuju	Rengalbeda
15	Kuju	Sarjamdih
15	Kuju	Soso
16	Kurma	Asua
16	Kurma	Bada Dholadih
16	Kurma	Bada Pahadpur
16	Kurma	Chediapahari
16	Kurma	Chota Dholadih
16	Kurma	Chota Pahadpur
16	Kurma	Guda
16	Kurma	Hakasara
16	Kurma	Jugitopa
16	Kurma	Kendmundi
16	Kurma	Kurma
16	Kurma	Maidnasai
16	Kurma	Namibeda
16	Kurma	Nayadih
16	Kurma	Raniganj
16	Kurma	Sakadpose
17	Potka	Arahasa
17	Potka	Barhi
17	Potka	Bita
17	Potka	Chalyama
17	Potka	Joldiha
17	Potka	Kamarbasa
17	Potka	Kashida
17	Potka	Keshargadhia
17	Potka	Lodha
17	Potka	Potka
17	Potka	Rangamatia
17	Potka	Telai
18	Rajnagar	Changua
18	Rajnagar	Gamdesai
18	Rajnagar	Hesra
18	Rajnagar	Kalajharna
18	Rajnagar	Krishnapur
18	Rajnagar	Magarkela
18	Rajnagar	Mudiapada
18	Rajnagar	Murumdih
18	Rajnagar	Rajnagar
18	Rajnagar	Shyamnagar
19	Tintidih	Adarhatu
19	Tintidih	Bada Khiri
19	Tintidih	Bada Matlima
19	Tintidih	Balijodi
19	Tintidih	Bandhdih
19	Tintidih	Bankhairbani
19	Tintidih	Bhalubasa
19	Tintidih	Chota Khiri
19	Tintidih	Gopinathpur
19	Tintidih	Kamalpur
19	Tintidih	Rajhand
19	Tintidih	Shobhapur
19	Tintidih	Tentla
19	Tintidih	Tintidih
20	Tumung	Antusai
20	Tumung	Barsasai
20	Tumung	Batujhor
20	Tumung	Bhuianachna
20	Tumung	Chaliyama
20	Tumung	Gumdipani
20	Tumung	Kesharsora
20	Tumung	Lakhiposi
20	Tumung	Maheshkudar
20	Tumung	Nagatumung
20	Tumung	Nayadih
20	Tumung	Pahadpur
20	Tumung	Tumung
21	Bijadih	Argunbila
21	Bijadih	Bardih
21	Bijadih	Barhi
21	Bijadih	Bhudsa
21	Bijadih	Bijadih
21	Bijadih	Chowke
21	Bijadih	Hatnabeda
21	Bijadih	Khairbani
21	Bijadih	Kumdih
21	Bijadih	Pukharia
21	Bijadih	Raghunathpur
21	Bijadih	Rola
21	Bijadih	Samarsai
21	Bijadih	Sursi

== Seraikela ==
List of villages in Seraikela block
Sl.	Name of panchayats	Name of villages
1	Chotadawna	Akhinathpur
1	Chotadawna	Badadawna
1	Chotadawna	Badalupung
1	Chotadawna	Bastamsai
1	Chotadawna	Chotadawna
1	Chotadawna	Jurgudiya
1	Chotadawna	Kadamdiha
1	Chotadawna	Majhladawna
1	Chotadawna	Mirgi
1	Chotadawna	Sidadih
1	Chotadawna	Sinisidma
1	Chotadawna	Swada
1	Chotadawna	Turasai
2	Govindpur	Bhurkuli
2	Govindpur	Devgirisai
2	Govindpur	Gilingburu
2	Govindpur	Govindpur
2	Govindpur	Hadua
2	Govindpur	Kandagoda
2	Govindpur	Kashipur
2	Govindpur	Keeta
2	Govindpur	Mahuldiha
2	Govindpur	Pandua
2	Govindpur	Rangpur
2	Govindpur	Shaldih
3	Hudu	Baldevpur
3	Hudu	Hatnada
3	Hudu	Hudu
3	Hudu	Janglikhas
3	Hudu	Kalajhor
3	Hudu	Kumardahi
3	Hudu	Kunamarcha
3	Hudu	Palobeda
3	Hudu	Poradih
3	Hudu	Sardabeda
3	Hudu	Tirildih
3	Hudu	Tumsha
3	Hudu	Uperbeda
4	Itakudar	Bundu
4	Itakudar	Dudhi
4	Itakudar	Itakudar
4	Itakudar	Lakhodih
4	Itakudar	Manikbazar
4	Itakudar	Narsinghpur
4	Itakudar	Padampur
4	Itakudar	Vasudevpur
5	Kamalpur	Banksai
5	Kamalpur	Ghodalang
5	Kamalpur	Jojo
5	Kamalpur	Kamalpur
5	Kamalpur	Kendua
5	Kamalpur	Mahulpani
5	Kamalpur	Sarmali
5	Kamalpur	Virdadih
6	Mohitpur	Bhadrodih
6	Mohitpur	Charakpathar
6	Mohitpur	Chitadih
6	Mohitpur	Gopalpur
6	Mohitpur	Jankipur
6	Mohitpur	Kasida
6	Mohitpur	Khatuakudar
6	Mohitpur	Madhupur
6	Mohitpur	Mahadevpur
6	Mohitpur	Mohitpur
6	Mohitpur	Padampur
6	Mohitpur	Padampur 166
6	Mohitpur	Pannaral
6	Mohitpur	Serengda
6	Mohitpur	Shakladih
6	Mohitpur	Santipur
6	Mohitpur	Sohandih
6	Mohitpur	Swarnpur
7	Mundatand	Bhalukpahari
7	Mundatand	Chhaitanpur
7	Mundatand	Dhatkidih
7	Mundatand	Domjuri
7	Mundatand	Gangpur
7	Mundatand	Gopinathpur
7	Mundatand	Juritand
7	Mundatand	Lakarbad
7	Mundatand	Mundatand
7	Mundatand	Raghunathpur
7	Mundatand	Rangamatia
7	Mundatand	Shovapur
7	Mundatand	Sindriyam
7	Mundatand	Ulidih
8	Murkum	Badabana
8	Murkum	Batidih
8	Murkum	Bhandarisai
8	Murkum	Dharamdiha
8	Murkum	Jhaliaposi
8	Murkum	Jordiha
8	Murkum	Krishnapur
8	Murkum	Kumdi
8	Murkum	Murkum
8	Murkum	Nuadih
8	Murkum	Nuagoda
8	Murkum	Rundasai
8	Murkum	Shatrushal
8	Murkum	Sijudih
9	Murup	Dasiadi
9	Murup	Dhatkidih
9	Murup	Guradih
9	Murup	Hathia
9	Murup	Hudingdih
9	Murup	Jagannathpur
9	Murup	Kadamdih
9	Murup	Mahalimurup
9	Murup	Murup
9	Murup	Narayandih
9	Murup	Rengudih
10	Nuagaon	Bishtupaduka
10	Nuagaon	Chotalupung
10	Nuagaon	Kalaguju
10	Nuagaon	Kalapathar
10	Nuagaon	Nuagaon
10	Nuagaon	Rajabasa
10	Nuagaon	Rugdisai
10	Nuagaon	Tablapur
10	Nuagaon	Thatupada
10	Nuagaon	Titirbila
11	Pandra	Badbil
11	Pandra	Balrampur
11	Pandra	Burudih
11	Pandra	Digarsai
11	Pandra	Dolandih
11	Pandra	Hensa
11	Pandra	Kenduposi
11	Pandra	Kudarsai
11	Pandra	Mukundpur
11	Pandra	Natidih
11	Pandra	Pandra
11	Pandra	Paralposi
11	Pandra	Patahensal
11	Pandra	Viramchandrapur
12	Pathanmara	Badatangrani
12	Pathanmara	Baladbandh
12	Pathanmara	Baliposi
12	Pathanmara	Chengdubi
12	Pathanmara	Chotatangrani
12	Pathanmara	Dhobadih
12	Pathanmara	Hathimara
12	Pathanmara	Hudangda
12	Pathanmara	Kope
12	Pathanmara	Kuli
12	Pathanmara	Lakrapahari
12	Pathanmara	Mangudih
12	Pathanmara	Paharpur
12	Pathanmara	Pampada
12	Pathanmara	Pathanmara
12	Pathanmara	Ragragi
12	Pathanmara	Tholko
13	Sini	Begunadih
13	Sini	Kadambeda
13	Sini	Kanchanpur
13	Sini	Koyra
13	Sini	Kursopur
13	Sini	Rankakocha
13	Sini	Sidma
13	Sini	Sini
14	Uperdugni	Baddih
14	Uperdugni	Bhelaidih
14	Uperdugni	Dungridih
14	Uperdugni	Krishnapur
14	Uperdugni	Palasdih
14	Uperdugni	Ukri
14	Uperdugni	Uperdugni

== See also ==
- Lists of villages in Jharkhand
