= Bhushan Bara =

Indian politician

Member of Jharkhand Legislative Assembly
- Incumbent
- Assumed office 2019
- Preceded by: Vimla Pradhan
- Constituency: Simdega

Personal details
- Party: Indian National Congress
- Children: 2 sons
- Parent: Peter Bara (Father)
- Occupation: MLA

Bhushan Bara is an Indian politician from the Indian National Congress. He is the state legislative assembly member from Simdega 2019.
