= Kulamara =

Village in Simdega, India

Coordinates: 22°25′57.69″N 84°43′34.8″E

Kulamara is a revenue village located in Simdega district of the Indian state of Jharkhand. The village is located in Targa Panchayat. Kulamara is situated in Bansjore block. It is one of 19 villages in Bansjore Block.

== Geography ==
Kulamara is located on the southern part of the Chota Nagpur Plateau, which forms the eastern edge of the Deccan plateau system. The Lurgangi river and the Dev river flow near Kulamara.

== Climate ==
Kulamara has a sub-tropical climate with temperature ranges from 20 °C to 40 °C during summer, and 3 °C to 21 °C during winter. The annual rainfall is about 145 centimetres (57 in). From June to September, the rainfall level is about 115 cm.

== Demographics ==
As of 2011 census of India, Kulamara had a population of 1210. The major languages spoken in this region are Nagpuri (or Sadri), Hindi, Mundari and Khariya.

Kulamra is home to people of many castes such as Binjhiya, Bhogta, Gond, Khariya, Kurmi, Das, Lohra, and Munda.

== Education ==
Kulamara hosts UPG GOVT MS Kulamara, which was established in 1960. It is a P. with U. Primary school. It educates some 81 boys and girls and is staffed by 3 teachers. It is primarily a Hindi medium school. The DISE code of the school is 20210900301.

== Festivals and dances ==
The region celebrates several major festivals and dances.

=== Karma ===
Karma is a festival of brothers and sisters. It rotates from one village to another. It's divided into three categories:

- Raj karma is celebrated by the entire community in the region.
- Budhi karma is observed only by old women in the month of June. This celebration is to call the god of rain.
- Padda karma is celebrated by the whole village. Sisters traditionally fast for a full day for their brothers.

=== Sarhul Dance ===
Sarhul is a prominent festival of Oraon and is celebrated with dancing. People hold hands to form a circle. Musicians use traditional Indian instruments, sitting inside the circle. Men traditionally wear a white dhoti with a red border, while women wear a white sari with a red border.

=== Bheja Dance ===
In the Bheja dance, dozens of young boys and girls gather at a particular place, form a chain by holding hands in alternate succession then dance.
