= Gourangkocha =

Gourangkocha is a town in the Ichagarh block of Seraikela Kharsawan district of Jharkhand. It is situated on the Patkum Chowka road. The block office of Ichagarh is present here.

Ichagarh block is one of the oldest place of historical importance in Jharkhand. This town has been developing over the time due to flooding in the neighbouring villages. Gourankocha is situated on the lap of "Burhababa" pahar (hill). It has been said that Shiva once visited this hill in order to spread his tantra meditation system. Language: The most spoken language is Bengali. The other languages are mundari, ho, Santhali. The river is 1 km away from the town of Gourankocha which is karkari. Karkari is the lifeline of the people of ichagarh, Gourankocha and other neighbouring villages.

== Education ==
One government high school and two private primary English medium schools are there.
