= Kurdeg =

- Village
- Location in Jharkhand, India Kurdeg (India)
- Coordinates: 22.5532°N 84.1195°E
- Country: India
- State: Jharkhand
- District: Simdega

Government
  - Type: Federal democracy

Population (2011)
  - Total: 1,629

Languages *
  - Official: Hindi, Urdu
- Time zone: UTC+5:30 (IST)
- PIN: 835212
- Telephone/ STD code: 06525
- Vehicle registration: JH 20
- Literacy: 69.14%
- Lok Sabha constituency: Khunti
- Vidhan Sabha constituency: Simdega
- Website: simdega.nic.in

Kurdeg is a village in the Kurdeg CD block in the Simdega subdivision of the Simdega district in the Indian state of Jharkhand.

== Geography ==
Cities, towns and locations in Simdega district in South Chotanagpur Division
M: municipality, R: rural/ urban centre, T: tourist centre
Owing to space constraints in the small map, the actual locations in a larger map may vary slightly

=== Location ===
Kurdeg is located at 22.5532°N 84.1195°E

=== Area overview ===
In the area presented in the map alongside, "the landscape is formed of hills and undulating plateau" in the south-western part of the Chota Nagpur Plateau. About 32% of the district is covered with forests (mark the shaded portions in the map.) It is an overwhelmingly rural area with 92.83% of the population living in the rural areas. A major portion of the rural population depends on rain-fed agriculture (average annual rainfall: 1,100-1,200 mm) for a living.

Note: The map alongside presents some of the notable locations in the district. All places marked in the map are linked in the larger full screen map.

== Civic administration ==
There is a police station at Kurdeg.

The headquarters of Kurdeg CD block are located at Kurdeg village.

== Demographics ==
According to the 2011 Census of India, Kurdeg had a total population of 1,629, of which 805 (49%) were males and 824 (51%) were females. Population in the age range 0–6 years was 252. The total number of literate persons in Kurdeg was 952 (69.14% of the population over 6 years.

(*For language details see Kurdeg block#Language and religion)

== Education ==
Government High School Kurdeg is a Hindi-medium coeducational institution established in 1960. It has facilities for teaching in class IX to class XII. The school has a playground and a library with 385 books.

Inter College Kurdeg is a Hindi-medium coeducational institution established in 1983. It has facilities for teaching in classes XI and XII. It has a playground.

Kasturba Gandhi Balika Vidyalaya is a Hindi-medium girls only institution established in 2011. It has facilities for teaching from class I to class XI. The school has a playground and a library with 58 books.

== Healthcare ==
There is a Community Health Centre (Hospital) at Kurdeg.
