= Vimla Pradhan =

Indian politician

Member of the Jharkhand Legislative Assembly
- In office 2009–2019
- Preceded by: Neil Tirkey
- Succeeded by: Bhushan Bara
- Constituency: Simdega

Minister for Social Welfare, Women and Child Development and Tourism Government of Jharkhand
- In office 2009–2013

Personal details
- Born: 1957 Naigamtoli, Simdega district, Jharkhand
- Died: 18 September 2026 (Age 69) Ranchi, Jharkhand, India
- Party: Bharatiya Janata Party
- Education: B.A., Simdega College
- Occupation: Politician

Vimla Pradhan was an Indian politician from Bharatiya Janata Party. She was the state legislative assembly member from Simdega from 2009 to 2019. She was minister of Social Welfare, Women and Child Development and Tourism in Government of Jharkhand. Vimla Pradhan has been nominated and awarded as ‘Best MLA’ of 2017 by the committee of Legislative Assembly of Jharkhand.

== Death ==
She died on 18 September 2026.
