= Bolba block =

Bolba
- Community development block
- Location in Jharkhand Bolba (India)
- Coordinates: 22.4313°N 84.3449°E
- Country: India
- State: Jharkhand
- District: Simdega

Government
  - Type: Federal democracy

Area
  - Total: 288.63 km^{2} (111.44 sq mi)

Population (2011)
  - Total: 30,786
  - Density: 106.66/km^{2} (276.25/sq mi)

Languages
  - Official: Hindi, Urdu
- Time zone: UTC+5:30 (IST)
- PIN: 835226
- Telephone/STD code: 0625
- Vehicle registration: JH 20
- Literacy: 63.26%
- Lok Sabha constituency: Khunti
- Vidhan Sabha constituency: Simdega
- Website: simdega.nic.in

Bolba block is a CD block that forms an administrative division in the Simdega subdivision of Simdega district, in the Indian state of Jharkhand.

== History ==
Gumla district was carved out of Ranchi district in 1983. Till 30 April 2001, Simdega was a subdivision of Gumla district and was made a separate district from that date.

== Maoist activities ==
According to a PIB release in 2018, Simdega is one of the thirty districts most affected by Left wing extremism in the country (along with twelve other districts of Jharkhand). “The terrain of the district is very tough and geography is favourable for naxal activities.” All police stations in the district are well fortified and equipped to handle the situation. Community policing activities are being prioritised to involve the simple village folk.

Hemant Soren, Chief Minister of Jharkhand, has claimed, in September 2021, that as a result of the effective action against left wing extremism, the “presence of hardcore Maoists has been limited to mainly four regions, namely Parasnath Pahar, Budha Pahar, Tri-junction of Seraikela-Khunti-Chaibasa district in Kolhan division and some of the areas along the Bihar border”.

== Geography ==
Simdega district lies in the south-western part of the Chota Nagpur Plateau. It has been described as “a dissected upland of ancient crystalline rocks” The general elevation of the district is 300 to 700 metres (980 to 2,300 ft) above mean sea level. The landscape is formed of hills and undulating plateau. The Major rivers of this area are Sankh, Deo, Girwa, and Palamara.

Dangadi, situated in the Bolba Block, is a waterfall and a popular picnic spot in Simdega.

Bolba CD block has an area of 288.63 km^{2}.Bolba police station serves Bolba CD block. The headquarters of Bolba CD block is located at Bolba village.

Bolba CD block is bounded by Thethaitangar CD block on a portion of the north and east, Kutra, Baragaon and Subhdega CD blocks in Sundargarh district of Odisha on the south, and Kersai CD block on the west and a portion of the north.

== Demographics ==
=== Population ===
According to the 2011 Census of India, Bolba CD block had a total population of 30,786, all of which were rural. There were 15,223 (49%) males and 15,563 (51%) females. Population in the age range 0–6 years was 4,827. Scheduled Castes numbered 2,109 (6.85%) and Scheduled Tribes numbered 22,433 (72.87%).

=== Literacy ===
According to the 2011 census, the total number of literate persons in Bolba CD block was 16,422 (63.26% of the population over 6 years) out of which males numbered 9,132 (71.58% of the male population over 6 years) and females numbered 7,290 (55.22% of the female population over 6 years). The gender disparity (the difference between female and male literacy rates) was 16.36%.

As of 2011 census, literacy in Simdega district was 67.59%. Literacy in Jharkhand was 67.63% in 2011. Literacy in India in 2011 was 74.04%.

See also – List of Jharkhand districts ranked by literacy rate

Literacy in CD Blocks of
Simdega district
Simdega Sadar subdivision
Simdega – 67.86%
Pakartanr – 70.04%
Kurdeg – 67.52%
Kersai – 67.80%
Bolba – 63.26%
Thethaitangar – 66.73%
Kolebira – 70.40%
Jaldega – 64.89
Bansjore – 61.47%
Bano – 63.43%
Source: 2011 Census: CD block Wise
Primary Census Abstract Data

=== Language and religion ===
Languages of Bolba block (2011)
1. Sadri (61.1%)
2. Kharia (33.1%)
3. Mundari (2.13%)
4. Kurukh (1.19%)
5. Hindi (1.15%)
6. Odia (1.06%)
7. Others (0.19%)

According to the Population by Mother Tongue 2011 data, in the Bolba subdistrict, Hindi was the mother-tongue of 19,212 persons forming 62.40% of the population, followed by (number of persons and percentage of population in brackets) Kharia (10,201/33.14%), Mundari (657/ 2.13%), Kurukh (366/ 1.19%), Odiya (327, 1.06%), and persons with other languages as mother-tongue (23/ 0.07%). Persons with Hindi as mother-tongue included 16,077 persons having Sadri/ Sadan, 2,746 persons having Nagpuri as mother-tongue.

Note: An attempt has been made to include all language groups each with at least 300 persons as their mother-tongue and only those groups with less than 300 persons as their mother-tongue are included in the “other languages” category. Comparatively smaller language groups with 200+ persons as their mother-tongue are mentioned in the text. Many languages have sub-groups. Those who are interested can see the reference for more details.

Hindi is the official language in Jharkhand and Urdu has been declared as an additional official language.

Religions in Bolba CD block (2011)
| Religion | Percent |
| Christianity | 58.16% |
| Hinduism | 30.42% |
| Sarna | 10.86% |
| Other or not stated | 0.56% |

According to the Population by Religious Communities 2011 data, in the Bolba subdistrict, Christians numbered 217,905 and formed 58.16% of the population, followed by (number of persons and percentage of population in brackets) Hindus (9,365/ 30.42%), Muslims (89/ 0.29%), persons who did not state their religion (43/ 0.14%), and ‘Other religious communities’ (3,384/ 10.99%).

Scheduled Tribes numbered 424,407 and formed 70.78% of the total population of Simdega district. Within the scheduled tribes the more populous tribes were (percentage of ST population in 2011 in brackets): Munda, Patars (33.61%), Kharia, Dhelki Kharia, Dudh Kharia, Hill Kharia (25.42%), Oraon, Dhangar Oraons (20.13%), Gonds (5.77%) and Lohras (5.32%).

== Economy ==
=== Overview ===
The District Census Handbook, Simdega, mentions, “Simdega is one of the least developed districts in the country... As per the survey conducted for the year 1997 –2002 five-year plan more than 60% of population is below poverty line.” Another report says that 80% and over of the population of Simdega district were in the BPL category in 2004–2005. In 2011-12, the proportion of BPL population in Simdega district came down to 38.26%. According to a study in 2013 (modified in 2019), "the incidence of poverty in Jharkhand is estimated at 46%, but 60% of the scheduled castes and scheduled tribes are still below poverty line."

=== Livelihood ===
Livelihood
in Bolba CD block
1. Cultivators (56.5%)
2. Agricultural labourers (34.7%)
3. Household industries (2.69%)
4. Other Workers (6.09%)

In Bolba CD block in 2011, amongst the class of total workers, cultivators numbered 10,251 and formed 56.53%, agricultural labourers numbered 6,297 and formed 34.72%, household industry workers numbered 488 and formed 2.69% and other workers numbered 1,098 and formed 6.05%. Total workers numbered 18,134 and formed 58.90% of the total population, and non-workers numbered 12,652 and formed 41.10% of the population.

=== Infrastructure ===
There are 26 inhabited villages in Bolba CD block. In 2011, 1 village had tap water (treated/ untreated), 26 villages had well water (covered/ uncovered), 26 villages had hand pumps, and all villages have drinking water facility. 9 villages had sub post offices, 23 villages had mobile phone coverage. 26 villages had pucca (paved) village roads, 18 villages had bus service (public/ private), 5 villages had taxi/ vans, 10 villages had tractors. 1 village had a bank branch, 17 villages had ration shops, 18 villages had assembly polling stations.

=== Agriculture ===
According to the District Census Handbook, Simdega, the rural population depends mainly on agriculture for a living. Agriculture in Simdega is in a very primitive state. The district has about 32% of forested area. Out of 1,34,024 hectares of cultivable land only 4,669.83 hectares of land is irrigated. Agriculture is mainly dependent on seasonal rain. The average rainfall of the district is 1100–1200 mm but much of it remains unutilised.

=== Backward Regions Grant Fund ===
Simdega district is listed as a backward region and receives financial support from the Backward Regions Grant Fund. The fund, created by the Government of India, is designed to redress regional imbalances in development. As of 2012, 272 districts across the country were listed under this scheme. The list includes 21 districts of Jharkhand.

== Education ==
Bolba CD block had 2 villages with pre-primary schools, 24 villages with primary schools, 18 villages with middle schools, 6 villages with secondary schools, 3 villages with senior secondary schools, 2 villages did not have educational facility.
.*Senior secondary schools are also known as Inter colleges in Jharkhand

== Healthcare ==
Bolba CD block had 1 village with primary health centre, 8 villages with primary health subcentres, 1 village with maternity and child welfare centre, 1 village with allopathic hospital, 2 villages with dispensary/ health centres, 3 villages with family welfare centres, 16 villages with medicine shops.
.*Private medical practitioners, alternative medicine etc. not included

There is a Community Health Centre (hospital) at Bolba.
