= List of villages in Jharkhand =

There are around 32,394 villages in 24 districts of Jharkhand.

- List of villages in East Singhbhum district
- List of villages in Khunti district
- List of villages in Ramgarh district
- List of villages in Seraikela Kharsawan district
- List of villages in Simdega district
