= Khariya =

Khadia
- Census town
- Nickname: khadia
- Location in Uttar Pradesh, India
- Coordinates: 24°7′N 83°2′E
- Country: India
- State: Uttar Pradesh
- District: Sonbhadra

Population (2001)
  - Total: 9,836

Languages
  - Official: Hindi
- Time zone: UTC+5:30 (IST)

Khariya is a census town in Sonbhadra district in the Indian state of Uttar Pradesh.

== Demographics ==
As of 2001 India census, Khariya had a population of 9836. Males constitute 55% of the population and females 45%. Khariya has an average literacy rate of 72%, higher than the national average of 59.5%: male literacy is 79%, and female literacy is 63%. In Khariya, 15% of the population is under 6 years of age.
