= Ichagarh =

- Village
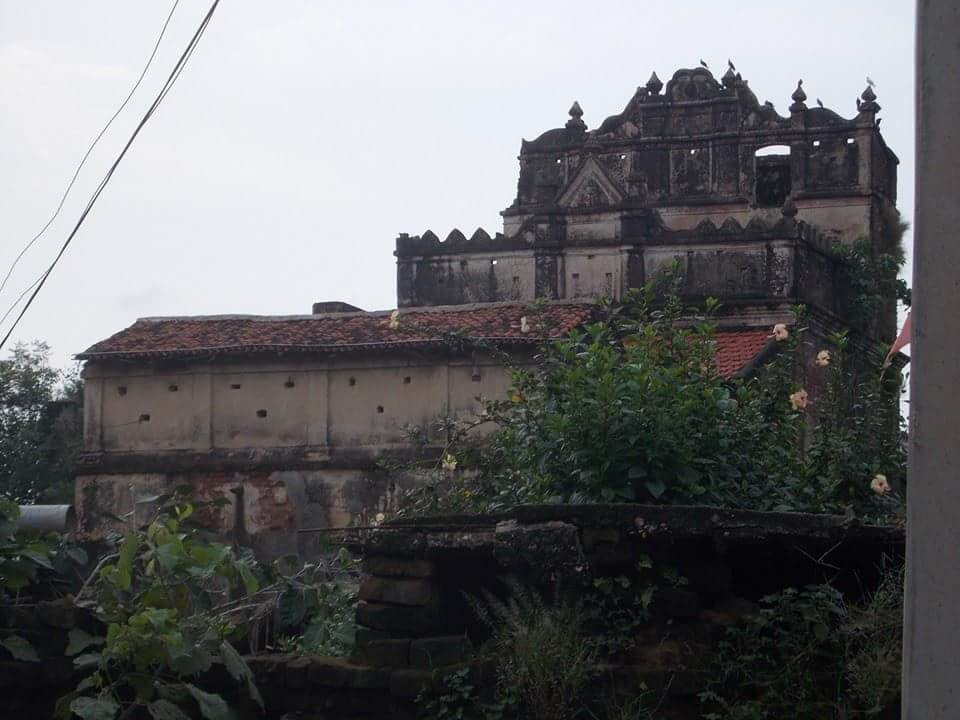
- Ichagarh Rajbari

- Location in Jharkhand, India Ichagarh (India)
- Coordinates: 23.0581°N 85.9356°E
- Country: India
- State: Jharkhand
- District: Seraikela Kharsawan

Government
  - Type: Federal democracy

Population (2011)
  - Total: 1,546

Languages *
  - Official: Hindi, Urdu
- Time zone: UTC+5:30 (IST)
- PIN: 832404
- Telephone/ STD code: 065971
- Vehicle registration: JH 22
- Literacy: 68.70%
- Lok Sabha constituency: Ranchi
- Vidhan Sabha constituency: Ichagarh
- Website: seraikela.nic.in

Ichagarh is a village in the Ichagarh CD block in the Chandil subdivision of the Seraikela Kharsawan district in the Indian state of Jharkhand.

== Geography ==
Cities, towns and locations in Seraikela Kharsawan district in Kolhan Division
M: municipality, R: rural/ urban centre, CT: census town, T: tourist centre
Owing to space constraints in the small map, the actual locations in a larger map may vary slightly

=== Location ===
Ichagarh is located at 23.0581°N 85.9356°E.

=== Area overview ===
The area shown in the map has been described as “part of the southern fringe of the Chotanagpur plateau and is a hilly upland tract”. 75.7% of the population lives in the rural areas and 24.3% lives in the urban areas.

Note: The map alongside presents some of the notable locations in the district. All places marked in the map are linked in the larger full screen map.

== Civic administration ==
There is a police station at Ichagarh.

The headquarters of Ichagarh CD block are located at Ichagarh village.

== Demographics ==
According to the 2011 Census of India, Ichagarh had a total population of 1,546, of which 755 (49%) were males and 791 (51%) were females. Population in the age range 0-6 years was 188. The total number of literate persons in Ichagarh was 933 (68.70% of the population over 6 years).

(*For language details see Ichagarh block#Language and religion)

== Education ==
Bikramaditya High School is a Hindi-medium coeducational institution established in 1947. It has facilities for teaching in classes IX and X. The school has a library with 348 books.
