= Simdega Assembly constituency =

Constituency of the Jharkhand legislative assembly in India

Coordinates: 22.617°N 84.496°E

Simdega
- Constituency No. 70 for the Jharkhand Legislative Assembly

Constituency details
- Country: India
- Region: East India
- State: Jharkhand
- District: Simdega
- Lok Sabha constituency: Khunti
- Established: 2000
- Total electors: 226,151
- Reservation: ST

Member of Legislative Assembly
- 5th Jharkhand Legislative Assembly
- Incumbent Bhushan Bara
- Party: INC
- Alliance: MGB
- Elected year: 2024

Simdega Assembly constituency is an assembly constituency in the Indian state of Jharkhand.

Most successful parties after separate Jharkhand state.
1. INC (60.0%)
2. BJP (40.0%)

== Members of the Legislative Assembly ==
Election	Name	Party
Bihar Legislative Assembly
1952	Alfred Uraon	Jharkhand Party
1957	Marshal Kullu	Jharkhand Party
1962	Simon Oraon	Janata Party
1967	P. Toppo	Independent politician
1969	Gajadhar Gond	Bharatiya Jana Sangh
1972	Simon Tigga	Indian National Congress
1977	Nirmal Kumar Besra	Janata Party
1980	Nirmal Kumar Besra	Bharatiya Janata Party
1985	Nirmal Kumar Besra	Bharatiya Janata Party
1990	Nirmal Kumar Besra	Bharatiya Janata Party
1995	Neil Tirkey	Jharkhand Mukti Morcha
2000	Neil Tirkey	Indian National Congress
Jharkhand Legislative Assembly
2005	Neil Tirkey	Indian National Congress
2009	Vimla Pradhan	Bharatiya Janata Party
2014	Vimla Pradhan	Bharatiya Janata Party
2019	Bhushan Bara	Indian National Congress
2024	Bhushan Bara	Indian National Congress

== Election results ==
=== Assembly election 2024 ===
2024 Jharkhand Legislative Assembly election: Simdega
Party	Candidate	Votes	%	±%
INC	Bhushan Bara	75,392	44.13%	▲2.67
BJP	Shradhanand Besra	66,164	38.73%	▼2.54
Jharkhand Party	Ireen Ekka	16,700	9.78%	▲2.42
Independent	Shanti Bala Kerketta	2,037	1.19%	New
Independent	Sushil Lakra	1,980	1.16%	New
JLKM	Suman Kullu	1,800	1.05%	New
BSP	Anuj Kundeshwar Ram	1,580	0.92%	New
NOTA	None of the Above	1,839	1.08%	▼1.53
Margin of victory		9,228	5.40%	▲5.21
Turnout		1,70,827	70.13%	▲5.45
Registered electors		2,43,593		▲7.71
INC hold		Swing	▲2.67	

=== Assembly election 2019 ===
2019 Jharkhand Legislative Assembly election: Simdega
Party	Candidate	Votes	%	±%
INC	Bhushan Bara	60,651	41.47%	▲26.30
BJP	Shradhanand Besra	60,366	41.27%	▲7.90
Jharkhand Party	Rezi Dungdung	10,753	7.35%	▼23.67
Rashtriya Sangail Party	Oliver Lakra	2,865	1.96%	New
JVM(P)	Mohan Baraik	2,137	1.46%	▼2.13
Independent	Abraham Minj	1,666	1.14%	New
JD(U)	Mohan Kachhap	961	0.66%	New
NOTA	None of the Above	3,819	2.61%	▲0.59
Margin of victory		285	0.19%	▼2.16
Turnout		1,46,270	64.68%	▼1.22
Registered electors		2,26,151		▲9.69
INC gain from BJP		Swing	▲8.09	

=== Assembly election 2014 ===
2014 Jharkhand Legislative Assembly election: Simdega
Party	Candidate	Votes	%	±%
BJP	Vimla Pradhan	45,343	33.37%	▲0.20
Jharkhand Party	Menon Ekka	42,149	31.02%	▲15.29
INC	Benjamin Lakra	20,601	15.16%	▼17.05
JMM	Neil Tirkey	11,385	8.38%	▲3.04
JVM(P)	Deepa Kumari Baraik	4,882	3.59%	New
Independent	Melani Ekka	1,680	1.24%	New
Akhil Bhartiya Jharkhand Party	Albinus Kharia	1,554	1.14%	New
NOTA	None of the Above	2,751	2.02%	New
Margin of victory		3,194	2.35%	▲1.39
Turnout		1,35,862	65.89%	▲1.05
Registered electors		2,06,181		▲15.27
BJP hold		Swing	▲0.20	

=== Assembly election 2009 ===
2009 Jharkhand Legislative Assembly election: Simdega
Party	Candidate	Votes	%	±%
BJP	Vimla Pradhan	38,476	33.18%	▲7.70
INC	Neil Tirkey	37,363	32.22%	▲0.65
Jharkhand Party	Anosh Ekka	18,252	15.74%	New
JMM	Fujames Dungdung	6,189	5.34%	New
GGP	Abraham Minj	3,889	3.35%	New
Independent	Biranjan Bara	2,814	2.43%	New
Independent	Johan Aind	1,375	1.19%	New
Margin of victory		1,113	0.96%	▼5.13
Turnout		1,15,975	64.84%	▲1.79
Registered electors		1,78,863		▼24.63
BJP gain from INC		Swing	▲1.61	

=== Assembly election 2005 ===
2005 Jharkhand Legislative Assembly election: Simdega
Party	Candidate	Votes	%	±%
INC	Neil Tirkey	47,230	31.57%	▼9.66
BJP	Nirmal Kumar Besra	38,119	25.48%	▼13.92
Independent	Libnus Tete	6,388	4.77%	New
Independent	Kondeshwar Ram	6,344	4.74%	New
BSP	Ajit Kiro	5,646	4.21%	New
UGDP	Arwind Ekka	3,468	2.59%	New
Independent	Johan Aind	1,816	1.36%	New
Margin of victory		9,111	6.09%	▲4.26
Turnout		1,49,610	63.05%	▲14.05
Registered electors		2,37,299		▲52.11
INC hold		Swing	▼9.66	

=== Assembly election 2000 ===
2000 Bihar Legislative Assembly election: Simdega
Party	Candidate	Votes	%	±%
INC	Niel Tirkey	31,514	41.23%	New
BJP	Chatur Baraik	30,118	39.40%	New
RJD	Kondeshwar Ram	6,923	9.06%	New
Independent	Kishore Ekka	2,651	3.47%	New
JMM	Arvind Ekka	2,352	3.08%	New
SP	Turtan Mundu	999	1.31%	New
Jharkhand Party	Tairas Ekka	614	0.80%	New
Margin of victory		1,396	1.83%	
Turnout		76,435	50.24%	
Registered electors		1,56,000		
INC win (new seat)				

== See also ==
- Vidhan Sabha
- List of states of India by type of legislature
