= Oraon =

Oraon may refer to:

- Oraon people or Kurukh, an ethnic group of India
  - Oraon language or Kurukh, their Dravidian language

== Persons with the surname ==
An Indian surname of the above people.

- Dinesh Oraon, politician
- Kartik Oraon, politician
- Lalit Oraon, politician
- Laloo Oraon, politician
- Manoj Kumar Oraon, politician
- Rameshwar Oraon, politician
- Sameer Oraon, politician
- Shankar Oraon, football player
- Shivshankar Oraon, politician
- Simon Oraon, environmentalist
- Subodh Oraon, politician
- Sukhram Oraon, politician
- Sumati Oraon, politician
- Tuna Oraon, politician

== See also ==
- Kurukh (disambiguation)
- Oraon Sadri, an Indo-Aryan language of India, under the Nagpuri or Sadri language of Jharkhand
