= Kurukh =

Kurukh or Kurux may refer to:

- Kurukh people, a people of eastern India and Bangladesh
- Kurukh language, their Dravidian language
  - Kurukh Banna, its Brahmic script
- Dhangar language, the only Dravidian language of Nepal, which may also be referred to as Nepali Kurukh

== See also ==
- Oraon (disambiguation), alternative name of the language
- Dhangar (disambiguation)
