= Dhangar (disambiguation) =

Dhangar is a herding caste of people found in the Indian states of Maharashtra, Goa and Uttar Pradesh.

Dhangar may also refer to:

- Dhangar, Madhya Pradesh, a town in Khurai tehsil, Madhya Pradesh
- Dhangar, a dialect of the Kurukh language

== See also ==
- Kurukh (disambiguation)
