= Tolong Siki (Unicode block) =

- Range: U+11DB0..U+11DEF (64 code points)
- Plane: SMP
- Scripts: Tolong Siki
- Assigned: 54 code points
- Unused: 10 reserved code points

Unicode version history
- 17.0 (2025): 54 (+54)

Unicode documentation
- Code chart ∣ Web page

Tolong Siki is a Unicode block containing letters for the Tolong Siki alphabet, invented in 1988 to write the Kurukh language of East India.

== Block ==
Tolong Siki^{[1]}^{[2]} Official Unicode Consortium code chart (PDF)
	0	1	2	3	4	5	6	7	8	9	A	B	C	D	E	F
U+11DBx	𑶰	𑶱	𑶲	𑶳	𑶴	𑶵	𑶶	𑶷	𑶸	𑶹	𑶺	𑶻	𑶼	𑶽	𑶾	𑶿
U+11DCx	𑷀	𑷁	𑷂	𑷃	𑷄	𑷅	𑷆	𑷇	𑷈	𑷉	𑷊	𑷋	𑷌	𑷍	𑷎	𑷏
U+11DDx	𑷐	𑷑	𑷒	𑷓	𑷔	𑷕	𑷖	𑷗	𑷘	𑷙	𑷚	𑷛				
U+11DEx	𑷠	𑷡	𑷢	𑷣	𑷤	𑷥	𑷦	𑷧	𑷨	𑷩						
Notes: 1. As of Unicode version 17.0; 2. Grey areas indicate non-assigned code points

== History ==
The following Unicode-related documents record the purpose and process of defining specific characters in the Tolong Siki block:

Version	Final code points (Note: Proposed code points and characters names may differ from final code points and names)	Count	L2 ID	WG2 ID	Document
17.0	U+11DB0..11DDB, 11DE0..11DE9	54	L2/10-106	N3811	Pandey, Anshuman (2010-04-08), Preliminary Proposal to Encode the Tolong Siki Script in the UCS
17.0	U+11DB0..11DDB, 11DE0..11DE9	54	L2/23-024		Pandey, Anshuman (2023-01-05), Proposal to encode Tolong Siki in Unicode
17.0	U+11DB0..11DDB, 11DE0..11DE9	54	L2/23-012		Anderson, Deborah; et al. (2023-01-17), "6 Tolong Siki", Recommendations to UTC #174 January 2023 on Script Proposals
17.0	U+11DB0..11DDB, 11DE0..11DE9	54	L2/23-005		Constable, Peter (2023-02-01), "D.1 Section III.6 Tolong Siki", UTC #174 Minutes
17.0	U+11DB0..11DDB, 11DE0..11DE9	54	L2/24-138	N5254	"Recommendation M71.06", Recommendations from WG 2 meeting 71, 2024-06-14
