= Kartik Oraon =

Indian politician (1924–1981)

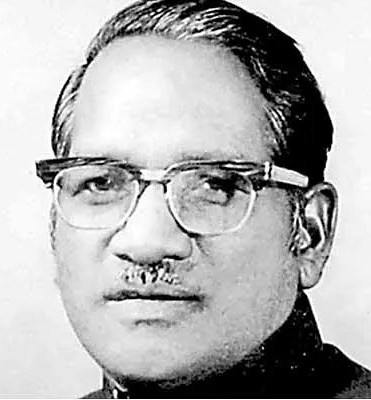
- Portrait of Kartik Oraon

Member of Lok Sabha
- In office 1967–1977
- Preceded by: David Munzni
- Succeeded by: Laloo Oraon
- Constituency: Lohardaga, Bihar
- In office 1980–1981
- Preceded by: Laloo Oraon
- Succeeded by: Sumati Oraon
- Constituency: Lohardaga, Bihar

Personal details
- Born: 29 October 1924 Littatoli village, Bihar and Orissa Province, British India (modern-day Jharkhand, India)
- Died: 8 December 1981 (aged 57) AIIMS, New Delhi, India
- Spouse: Sumati Oraon (m. 1950)
- Parent(s): Jaira Oraon (father); Birsi Oraon (mother)

Baba Kartik Oraon (29 October 1924 – 8 December 1981) was an Indian politician and an Adivasi leader from the Indian National Congress. He also participated in the Indian freedom movement of 1947. Oraon founded the Akhil Bharatiya Adivasi Vikas Parishad organisation.

== Early life ==
Oraon was born in a village named Karounda Littatoli in Gumla district, Jharkhand state, India, into the Kurukh community. His was the fourth child of his father, Jaira Oraon, and mother, Birsi Oraon. He was named Kartik because he was born in the month of Kartik of the Hindu calendar.

== Education ==
After completing high school in Gumla in 1942, Oraon passed Intermediate examination from Science College, Patna, and completed a bachelor of engineering degree from Bihar College of Engineering, Patna. He continued his studies and acquired a number of qualifications from institutions in the United Kingdom. He was considered one of the most educated men of the Kurukh community for his foreign education and his use of the Oraon Sadri and Kurukh languages.

== Political career ==
Oraon held several official positions and represented Lohardaga constituency in the Parliament of India several times. He was minister for aviation and communication of the Government of India. He died in New Delhi on 8 December 1981. He was three times a member of parliament in the Lok Sabha from the Lohardaga constituency. He was also known by the name of Baba Kartik Saheb.

Electoral history
Election	House	Constituency	Party	Votes	%	Result
1980	Lok Sabha	Lohardaga	INC(I)	129,038	51.46	Won
1977	Lok Sabha	Lohardaga	INC	77,391	30.97	Lost
1971	Lok Sabha	Lohardaga	INC	102,376	53.77	Won
1967	Lok Sabha	Lohardaga	INC	62,260	39.80	Won
1962	Lok Sabha	Lohardaga	INC	41,804	31.74	Lost
1977	Bihar Legislative Assembly	Bishunpur	INC	25,701	62.69	Won

== See also ==
- List of people from Jharkhand
- Kurukh people
