= Kurukh pronouns =

Words in Kurukh that substitute for a noun or noun phrase

Kurukh pronouns are the words used in place of nouns within the Northern Dravidian branch of the Dravidian language family. The pronoun system works on an agglutinative pattern, where regular changes and endings are added directly to the main root stems. While neighboring Indo-Aryan languages use separate postpositions to join words, Kurukh grammar keeps old Dravidian structures to link pronouns directly.

The system has a strict clusivity rule for the first-person plural (we), uses an animacy hierarchy to separate humans from objects, and has a five-way demonstrative system based on distance and how well something is known in the conversation.

== Core pronouns ==
Personal pronouns change depending on whether they are singular or plural. Their basic nominative forms historically use long vowels. Third-person pronouns work as demonstratives and follow a strict animacy hierarchy that separates human beings from animals and objects.

Core pronouns
| Class | Person & Type | Meaning | Singular | Plural |
|---|---|---|---|---|
| Personal | First person | Exclusive (excluding addressee) | ēn (I) | ēm (We) |
| Personal | First person | Inclusive (including addressee) | ēn (I) | nām (We and you) |
| Personal | Second person | Direct address | nīn (You) | nīm (You all) |
| Personal | Reflexive | Logophoric & Subject-Oriented | tān (Oneself) (He / She / It) | tām (Themselves) (They) |
| Demonstrative | Third person | | | |
| Demonstrative | Third person | Epicene (Human) | ār (They / He / She) | abṛar (They - Human) |
| Demonstrative | Third person | Masculine (Human) | ās (He) | abṛar (They - Human) |
| Demonstrative | Third person | Feminine (Human) | ād (She / It) | abṛar (They - Human) |
| Demonstrative | Third person | Neuter (Non-human) | ād (She / It) | abṛad (They - Non-human) |

== Stem structure and clusivity ==
The basic nominative forms are built directly from core pronoun stems that contain inherent long vowels, which then combine with historical singular or plural nasal markers. The primary historical core pronoun stems are the first-person exclusive stem ē-, the first-person inclusive stem nā-, the second-person stem nī-, and the reflexive stem tā-. To form full nominative pronouns, these stems join with specific number suffixes: the singular marker -n and the plural marker -m. This structural combination creates the regular forms directly: the stem ē- + -n forms ēn (I), ē- + -m forms ēm (We - exclusive), the stem nā- + -m forms nām (We - inclusive), the stem nī- + -n forms nīn (You), and nī- + -m forms nīm (You all).

The difference between the exclusive ēm and the inclusive nām is an old feature found across the Dravidian language family. In everyday speech, ēm refers to a group that excludes the listener, while nām is an open group that includes both the speaker and the listener. Because an inclusive meaning naturally needs at least two people to be involved, the inclusive core stem nā- cannot take the singular marker -n. For this reason, an inclusive singular pronoun is grammatically impossible, keeping the entire inclusive system only in the plural category.

== Oblique stem mutation ==
In Kurukh grammar, personal and reflexive pronouns do not take case endings or postpositions directly onto their regular nominative forms. Instead, the language uses a regular system of internal sound changes to form an oblique stem, which acts as a bridge before any case markers are attached.

The change from a nominative pronoun to an oblique base depends entirely on number and applies directly to the underlying elements of the core pronoun stems. The first step involves systemic vowel shortening, where the long vowels within the core pronoun stems (ē-, nā-, nī-, tā-) shift into corresponding short vowels (e, i, and a).

Once the stem vowel shortens, a specific consonant marker is added between the modified root and the case ending based on number. The singular forms—which include the first-person singular, second-person singular, and reflexive singular—add a nasal velar augment written as -ṅ(g)-. This marker creates a velar sound at the back of the mouth, keeping the shortened stem vowel from blending into the case ending. On the other hand, the plural forms—which include the exclusive and inclusive first-person plurals, the second-person plural, and the reflexive plural—undergo nasal labial gemination, shifting to -m(m)-. This doubling of the nasal sound keeps the word boundaries clear and maintains a steady pattern across all plural forms. This change works the same way for both personal and reflexive classes, converting the core pronoun stem into a functional oblique base before case markers are added.

Morphological oblique derivation
| Nominative pronoun | Grammatical value | Internal increment | Resulting oblique stem |
|---|---|---|---|
| ēn | First person singular | -ṅ(g)- (Nasal Velar Augment) | eṅ(g)- |
| nīn | Second person singular | -ṅ(g)- (Nasal Velar Augment) | niṅ(g)- |
| tān | Reflexive singular | -ṅ(g)- (Nasal Velar Augment) | taṅ(g)- |
| ēm | First person plural (excl.) | -m(m)- (Nasal Labial Gemination) | em(m)- |
| nām | First person plural (incl.) | -m(m)- (Nasal Labial Gemination) | nam(m)- |
| nīm | Second person plural | -m(m)- (Nasal Labial Gemination) | nim(m)- |
| tām | Reflexive plural | -m(m)- (Nasal Labial Gemination) | tam(m)- |

== Genitive case splitting ==
The genitive system in Kurukh operates through a case-splitting pattern that changes depending on how the pronoun is used in a sentence. The grammar separates possessives that function as adjectives modifying a following noun from possessives that function independently as standalone words.

For personal and reflexive pronouns, these genitive markers are strictly added to the modified oblique stems rather than the nominative bases. When a personal pronoun acts as an adjective directly qualifying a following noun, it takes the genitive-attributive suffix -e. For example, combining the first-person singular oblique stem eṅ(g)- with this suffix produces eṅge (my), which cannot stand alone and must be followed by a noun, such as eṅge appas (my father). If the pronoun functions as an independent, standalone possessive noun phrase, it takes the genitive-pronominal suffix -ay instead. Fusing the same oblique stem eṅ(g)- with this suffix results in the form eṅgay (mine), which carries full nominal weight and can act as the complete subject or object of a sentence without needing another noun.

In contrast, the third-person and demonstrative pronouns avoid internal sound shifts and nasal additions entirely, attaching genitive endings directly to their academic bases. When working as a modifier before a noun, the demonstrative system uses the adjectival modifier suffix -in, allowing the masculine singular pronoun ās to form āsin (his). When required to act as a standalone possessive pronoun by itself, it uses the direct independent possessive suffix -ay, converting the same base directly into āsay (his/belonging to him) to operate as a completely independent phrase.

== Case declension ==
Once a pronoun moves into its respective base form, it takes the native set of case endings. These markers include the accusative ending -an, which marks definite or human direct objects. Dative forms are indicated by the suffixes -ā or -āgē to target recipients, destinations, or indirect objects. Spatial source or cause are marked by the ablative variants -antī or -(n)tī, while spatial location is handled by the locative ending -(a)nū, covering both inessive and adessive meanings.

Pronominal declension
| Case | Suffix | 1P. SG eṅ(g)- | 1P. PL (Excl) em(m)- | 1P. PL (Incl) nam(m)- | 2P. SG niṅ(g)- | 2P. PL nim(m)- |
|---|---|---|---|---|---|---|
| Nominative | ∅ | ēn | ēm | nām | nīn | nīm |
| Accusative | -an | eṅgan | emman | namman | niṅgan | nimman |
| Dative | -ā / -āgē | eṅgā / eṅgāgē | emmā / emmāgē | nammā / nammāgē | niṅgā / niṅgāgē | nimmā / nimmāgē |
| Genitive-Attributive | -e | eṅge | emme | namme | niṅge | nimme |
| Genitive-Pronominal | -ay | eṅgay | emmay | nammay | niṅgay | nimmay |
| Ablative | -antī / -(n)tī | eṅgantī | emmantī | nammantī | niṅgantī | nimmantī |
| Locative | -(a)nū | eṅganū | emmanū | nammanū | niṅganū | nimmanū |

== Demonstrative systems ==
Kurukh does not have separate, independent roots for third-person personal pronouns. Instead, all third-person reference works through a demonstrative system built on a five-vowel pattern inherited from Proto-Dravidian. This system groups distance and awareness into two clear types: physical distance (spatial deixis) and knowledge status (epistemic deixis).

The spatial forms use long vowels: distal ā- points to things far from both the speaker and listener; proximal ī- points to things close to the speaker; and medial ū- indicates things close to the listener. While standard speech uses the simple ū- base, everyday spoken language often adds an initial sound, creating the colloquial variant hū-.

On the other hand, awareness indicators use the remaining vowels to show how well a person or object is known: the relative marker ō- links to a person or object already mentioned or known in the conversation, while questions are handled by the interrogative base ē- and its prominent colloquial modifier prefix ēkā-. Structurally, the long vowel ē- base keeps the system regular, though everyday speech frequently adds a nasal sound to form the variant nē- like for example nēr means 'who?' or switches to the ēkā- prefix (such as ēkād or ēkābṛā) in active communication to specify exact non-human attributes.

Full pronouns that can stand alone as nouns are made by combining these five vowel bases with final gender and animacy endings: suffixes -s for masculine singular, non-masculine suffix -d for feminine/neuter singular, and human plural suffix -r for human plural. The regular combination of these bases and endings creates the standard pronoun forms directly: ā- + -s forms ās, ā- + -d forms ād, and ā- + -r forms ār.

Following comparative Dravidian structures, Kurukh uses honorific pluralization to show social distance or respect. When speaking of a single human of high status, senior generation, or kinship respect, the standard singular demonstrative markers ās / ād are replaced by the epicene human plural form ār to function as an honorific singular.

Demonstrative and epistemic coordination
| Deictic Type | Base | Value | Singular / Grammatical Singular | | | True plural | |
| Deictic Type | Base | Value | Standard Singular | | Epicene / Honorific Singular (Plural Form) | Epicene Collective (Human Group) | Neuter (Non-Human) |
| Deictic Type | Base | Value | Masc. (-s) | Non-Masc. (-d) | Epicene / Honorific Singular (Plural Form) | Epicene Collective (Human Group) | Neuter (Non-Human) |
|---|---|---|---|---|---|---|---|
| Spatial (Distance) | ā- | Distal (Far) | ās (He / That man) | ād (She / It / That entity) | ār (They - Human / Hon SG) | abṛar (They - True plural / Human Group) | abṛā / abṛad (Those things / animals) |
| Spatial (Distance) | ī- | Proximal (Near) | īs (This man) | īd (This female / thing) | īr (These Human / Hon SG) | ibṛar (These - True plural / Human Group) | ibṛā / ibṛad (These things / animals) |
| Spatial (Distance) | ū- | Medial (Near Listener) | ūs (Colloq: hūs) (He yonder) | ūd (Colloq: hūd) (She/It yonder) | ūr (Colloq: hūr) (They yonder / Hon SG) | ubṛar (Colloq: hubṛar) (True human plural) | ubṛā / ubṛad (Colloq: hubṛā) (Those things yonder) |
| Epistemic (Awareness) | ē- | Interrogative (Open) | ēs (Colloq: nēs) (Which man? / Who?) | ēd (Colloq: nēd / ēkād) (Which female/thing?) | ēr (Colloq: nēr) (Who? - Hon SG) | ebṛar (Colloq: nebṛar) (Which specific group?) | ebṛā / ebṛad (Colloq: nēbṛā / ēkābṛā) (Which things?) |
| Epistemic (Awareness) | ō- | Relative (Closed) | ōs (The man who...) | ōd (The entity which...) | ōr (The person who... / Hon) | obṛar (The people who...) | obṛā / obṛad (The entities which...) |

Unlike personal and reflexive pronouns that need internal sound changes and nasal markers to build oblique forms, the demonstrative system uses a direct pattern. The independent pronouns—formed by joining the five vowel bases with the endings (-s, -d, -r)—take case endings directly onto their academic forms without any other shifts. For example, when adding the accusative ending -an, the distal nominative forms change directly into object positions, moving from masculine singular ās to āsan, feminine-neuter singular ād to ādan, and epicene ār to āran. This rule remains the same across all distance types (the proximal ī-, medial ū-) and awareness groupings (the interrogative ē-, relative ō-), keeping a uniform structure throughout the demonstrative system.

=== Word structure of absolute plurals ===
A closer look at the pointing system shows a clear rule governing vowel length changes based on specific numbers and word weight. Standard pointing words that have two meanings (such as ār, which works both as a normal plural and a respectful singular) keep their long-vowel roots (distal ā-, proximal ī-, medial ū-'). However, when the language forms absolute, non-respectful "true" plurals, the core vowel always becomes short (changing to short a-, i-, and u-').

This shift creates a highly structured alignment for internal sounds and ancient historical markers. The complete structure operates on a strict sequence where the shortened base connects with an identity sound, followed by a plural marker, and concludes with a final group suffix. The process begins at the foundational level with the base root, where the original long far-away prefix ā- undergoes an initial structural shortening to become a short a-. This shift acts as the primary trigger for the entire word, signaling that the structure is entering a heavy, non-respectful category specifically reserved for absolute plurality. Immediately following this shortened base, the consonant -b- (*-w-) is inserted as a connecting sound. Historically, this segment represents a direct continuation of ancient Proto-Dravidian non-masculine plural markers. In the modern language, it functions as a sound bridge that stabilizes the transition between the newly shortened root vowel and the distinct rolling sound of the upcoming plural element.

Directly attached to this bridge is the core plural marker -ṛ- (working with its short vowel as -ṛa-), which acts as a defining Northern Dravidian collective marker. This element carries the primary grammatical weight, serving as the central engine that injects the explicit meaning of heavy plurality into the word structure. The eventual sound of the absolute plural depends entirely on whether a final consonant suffix is added to this core.

When a specific human target is designated, the classic Dravidian human plural suffix -r is appended to the absolute end of the chain. This marker fuses directly with the preceding element, closing the syllable structure and preventing the internal vowel of the core engine from lengthening. Because it retains this active, overt grammatical suffix, the resulting construction surfaces as the explicit human plural form abṛar (*awaṛar) (those specific people). This word specifically targets a collective group, strictly excluding any respectful singular meanings.

For references directed toward non-human entities, such as objects, abstract concepts, or animals, the structure operates on a suffix-drop principle where no further consonant ending is added. The word naturally concludes its boundary right on the pluralizing core marker without any closing element. Due to the complete absence of a terminal consonant to block the syllable, the word undergoes automatic lengthening at its outer boundary. This shift causes the final short vowel to lengthen, surfacing as the bare absolute form abṛā (*awaṛā) to denote things, animals, or general non-human plural entities.

When these individual segments fuse together in historical tracking, they show how ancient sound sequences transition systematically into modern absolute plurals. This elaborate internal structure operates with identical precision across all five vowel bases of the pointing framework. It produces perfectly synchronized human and neuter absolute pairs for every category: the nearby human ibṛar (*iwaṛar) paired with the neuter ibṛā (*iwaṛā) (denoting these specific people or things nearby), the middle human ubṛar (*uwaṛar) and neuter ubṛā (*uwaṛā) (pointing to entities near the listener), the question human ebṛar (*ewaṛar) and neuter ebṛā (*ewaṛā) (asking which specific people or things), and the context human obṛar (*owaṛar) and neuter obṛā (*owaṛā) (referring to those particular people or things bound by context).

While theoretical single-number cross-formations like *abṛas (*awaṛas*) (masculine singular) or *abṛad (*awaṛad*) (feminine/neuter singular) could technically be built by swapping final individual suffixes, standard usage completely restricts this heavy internal modification to the absolute plural category to maintain system clarity and prevent any confusion with the regular long-vowel respectful singular forms.

== Reflexive and logophoric system ==
Reflexive pronouns in Kurukh use the old historical root tā-. This system handles two different roles depending on sentence structure: it marks normal reflexivity in simple clauses and tracks main actors across complex sentences.

The pronouns follow the exact same internal oblique changes seen in the personal pronoun section. The singular nominative tān changes to the oblique stem taṅ(g)-, and the plural nominative tām, changes to the oblique stem tam(m)-. The basic forms are made regularly: tā- + -n forms the singular tān (oneself/himself/herself/itself), and tā- + -m forms the plural tām (ourselves/themselves).

Beyond simple self-reference (such as "he bit himself"), tān and tām perform a key function in reported speech or indirect sentences. When a speaker reports what someone else said about themselves, Kurukh uses tān instead of a regular third-person demonstrative (ās or ād) to avoid confusion. For example, if a person named Mangras says that he (meaning Mangras himself) is going, the sentence uses tān. If Mangras is talking about a completely different person going, the sentence uses the standard demonstrative ās. This system allows the language to track identity accurately across long narratives without any confusion.

== See also ==
- Kurukh language

== Sources ==
- Hahn, Ferdinand (1911). Kurukh Grammar. Bengal Secretariat Press – via Internet Archive.
