= Tolong Siki =

Abugida writing system of the Brahmic family

Tolong Siki 𑶻𑶳𑷑𑶳𑷎 𑷔𑶰𑷊𑶰
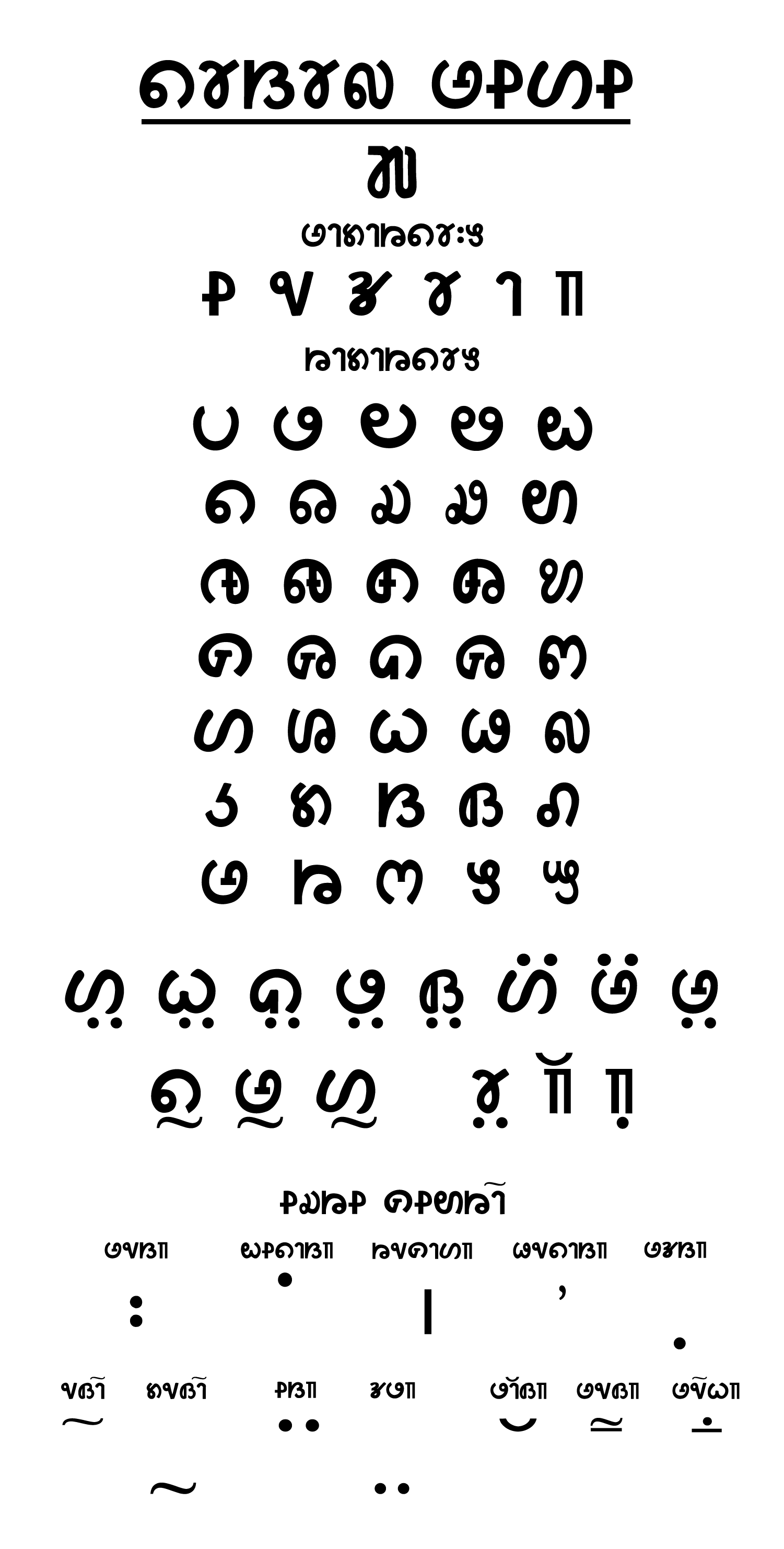
- Tolong Siki Aksharamala chart divided into 6 Vowels, 35 Consonants,11 common foreign consonants, 3 derived vowels, 12 diacritic marks)
- Script type: Alphabet
- Creator: Dr Narayan Oraon
- Created: 1999
- Period: 1999 to present
- Direction: Left to Right
- Official script: India: Jharkhand (additional); West Bengal (additional)
- Region: India: Jharkhand; Odisha; West Bengal; Chhattisgarh; Assam; Bihar; Tripura
- Languages: Kurukh

Related scripts
- Parent systems: Original invention (Influenced by Dravidian scripts): Tolong Siki

ISO 15924
- ISO 15924: Tols (299), Tolong Siki

Unicode
- Unicode alias: Tolong Siki
- Unicode range: U+11DB0–U+11DEF Tolong Siki

Tolong Siki (Kurukh: [t̪oːɽan siki], 𑶻𑶳𑷑𑶳𑷎 𑷔𑶰𑷊𑶰 ) is an alphabetic script created specifically for the Kurux language in 1999 by Narayan Oraon, a doctor. Many books and magazines have been published in Tolong Siki, and it was officially recognised by the state of Jharkhand in 2007. The Kurukh Literary Society of India has been instrumental in spreading the Tolong Siki script for Kurukh literature.

== Etymology ==
The name Tolong Siki is derived from two Kurukh terms:

- Tolong: Refers to a traditional garment (loincloth) worn by men in the Kurukh community. The script's creator, Dr. Narayan Oraon, used the styles of wrapping this garment as inspiration for the shapes of the letters.
- Siki: A modified version of the word Sika, which refers to the traditional practice of branding marks on the arms or skin, often used to denote identity or endurance. In this context, it simply means "script" or "symbol."

== Vowels ==
Tolong Siki contains 6 basic vowel letters:

Tolong Siki Vowels (𑷔𑶴𑷐𑶴𑷕𑶻𑶳𑷙𑶳, Sarahtoṛ)
𑶰 i IPA: /i/	𑶱 e IPA: /e/	𑶲 u IPA: /u/	𑶳 o IPA: /o/	𑶴 a IPA: /a/	𑶵 ā IPA: /ɑ/

== Consonants ==
Tolong Siki represents native consonant sounds using a basic inventory of 36 letters:

Tolong Siki Consonants (𑷕𑶴𑷐𑶴𑷕𑶻𑶳𑶳, Harahtoṛ)
𑶶 p IPA: /p/	𑶷 ph IPA: /pʰ/	𑶸 b IPA: /b/	𑶹 bh IPA: /bʱ/	𑶺 m IPA: /m/
𑶻 t IPA: /t̪/	𑶼 th IPA: /t̪ʰ/	𑶽 d IPA: /d̪/	𑶾 dh IPA: /d̪ʱ/	𑶿 n IPA: /n/
𑷀 ṭ IPA: /ʈ/	𑷁 ṭh IPA: /ʈʰ/	𑷂 ḍ IPA: /ɖ/	𑷃 ḍh IPA: /ɖʱ/	𑷄 ṇ IPA: /ɳ/
𑷅 c IPA: /c/	𑷆 ch IPA: /tʃʰ/	𑷇 j IPA: /ɟ/	𑷈 jh IPA: /dʒʱ/	𑷉 ñ IPA: /ɲ/
𑷊 k IPA: /k/	𑷋 kh IPA: /kʰ/	𑷌 g IPA: /ɡ/	𑷍 gh IPA: /ɡʱ/	𑷎 ṅ IPA: /ŋ/
𑷏 y IPA: /j/	𑷐 r IPA: /ɾ/	𑷑 l IPA: /l/	𑷒 v IPA: /ʋ/	𑷓 ñ IPA: /ɲ/
𑷔 s IPA: /s/	𑷕 h IPA: /ɦ/	𑷖 x IPA: /x/	𑷗 ṛ IPA: /ɽ/	𑷘 ṛh IPA: /ɽʰ/

== Numerals ==
Tolong Siki has its own set of decimal digits (0–9) that function identically to standard Western numerals.

Tolong Siki Digits ( 𑷑𑶱𑷊𑷋𑶵, Lenkakha )
0
𑷠
Nidi
IPA: /nid̪i/
1
𑷡
Oṅdu
IPA: /oŋd̪u/
2
𑷢
Eṅṛe
IPA: /eŋɽe/
3
𑷢
Mundu
IPA: /muŋd̪u/
4
𑷤
Nāx
IPA: /naːx/
5
𑷥
Paṅce
IPA: /paŋtʃe/
6
𑷦
Soyi
IPA: /soji/
7
𑷧
Saye
IPA: /saje/
8
𑷨
Ax
IPA: /akh/
9
𑷩
Naye
IPA: /naje/
10
𑷡𑷠
Doyi
IPA: /d̪oji/

== Sample text ==
The following text is Article 1 of the Universal Declaration of Human Rights, written in Tolong Siki:

=== Kurukh in Tolong Siki ===
𑷕𑶳𑷐𑶺𑶵 𑶵𑷑𑶵𑷐𑶰𑶿 𑷕𑶴𑷊 𑷌𑶴𑷕𑶰 𑶸𑶵𑷐𑶱 𑶿𑶲 𑶺𑶴𑷑𑷑𑶰𑶿𑶻𑶵 𑶴𑷗𑶵𑷂𑶰 𑶴𑷐𑶵 𑶴𑷓𑷀𑶱𑶺 𑶺𑶴𑶿𑶿𑶵 𑷌𑶴𑷕𑶰 𑷕𑶴𑶻 𑷖𑶴𑷋𑶴𑷐𑷊𑶰 𑷐𑶴𑶰. 𑶵𑷐𑶰𑶿 𑷑𑶲𑷐 𑶴𑷐𑶵 𑷇𑶰𑷏𑶵 𑷌𑶴𑷕𑶰 𑷂𑶴𑶽 𑶸𑶴𑶲𑷔𑶵 𑷖𑶴𑷋𑶴𑷊𑶰𑷙 𑷐𑶴𑶰𑷙 𑶴𑷐𑶵 𑶻𑶲𑶺𑷕𑶱𑷙𑷓 𑶺𑶴𑷈𑶰 𑶿𑶲𑷙 𑶺𑶱𑷑-𑶶̰𑶱𑶺 𑷌𑶴𑷕𑶰 𑶸𑶱𑶽𑷕𑶵𑷐 𑶿𑶴𑶿𑶿𑶵 𑷅𑶴𑷕𑶰𑷙

=== Romanisation ===
Hormā ālārin hak gahi bāre nū mallintā azādi arā aṅṭem mannā gahi haq xakharki raī. Ārin lur arā jiyā gahi dav bausā xakhakī raī arā tumhēṅ majhī nū mel-prem gahi bevhār nannā cahī.

=== Translation ===
Article 1: All human beings are born free and equal in dignity and rights. They are endowed with reason and conscience and should act towards one another in a spirit of brotherhood.

== Unicode ==
Tolong Siki was added to the Unicode Standard in September 2025 with the release of version 17.0.

The Unicode block for Tolong Siki is U+11DB0–U+11DEF:

Tolong Siki^{[1]}^{[2]} Official Unicode Consortium code chart (PDF)
	0	1	2	3	4	5	6	7	8	9	A	B	C	D	E	F
U+11DBx	𑶰	𑶱	𑶲	𑶳	𑶴	𑶵	𑶶	𑶷	𑶸	𑶹	𑶺	𑶻	𑶼	𑶽	𑶾	𑶿
U+11DCx	𑷀	𑷁	𑷂	𑷃	𑷄	𑷅	𑷆	𑷇	𑷈	𑷉	𑷊	𑷋	𑷌	𑷍	𑷎	𑷏
U+11DDx	𑷐	𑷑	𑷒	𑷓	𑷔	𑷕	𑷖	𑷗	𑷘	𑷙	𑷚	𑷛				
U+11DEx	𑷠	𑷡	𑷢	𑷣	𑷤	𑷥	𑷦	𑷧	𑷨	𑷩						
Notes 1.As of Unicode version 17.0 2.Grey areas indicate non-assigned code points

== Gallery ==
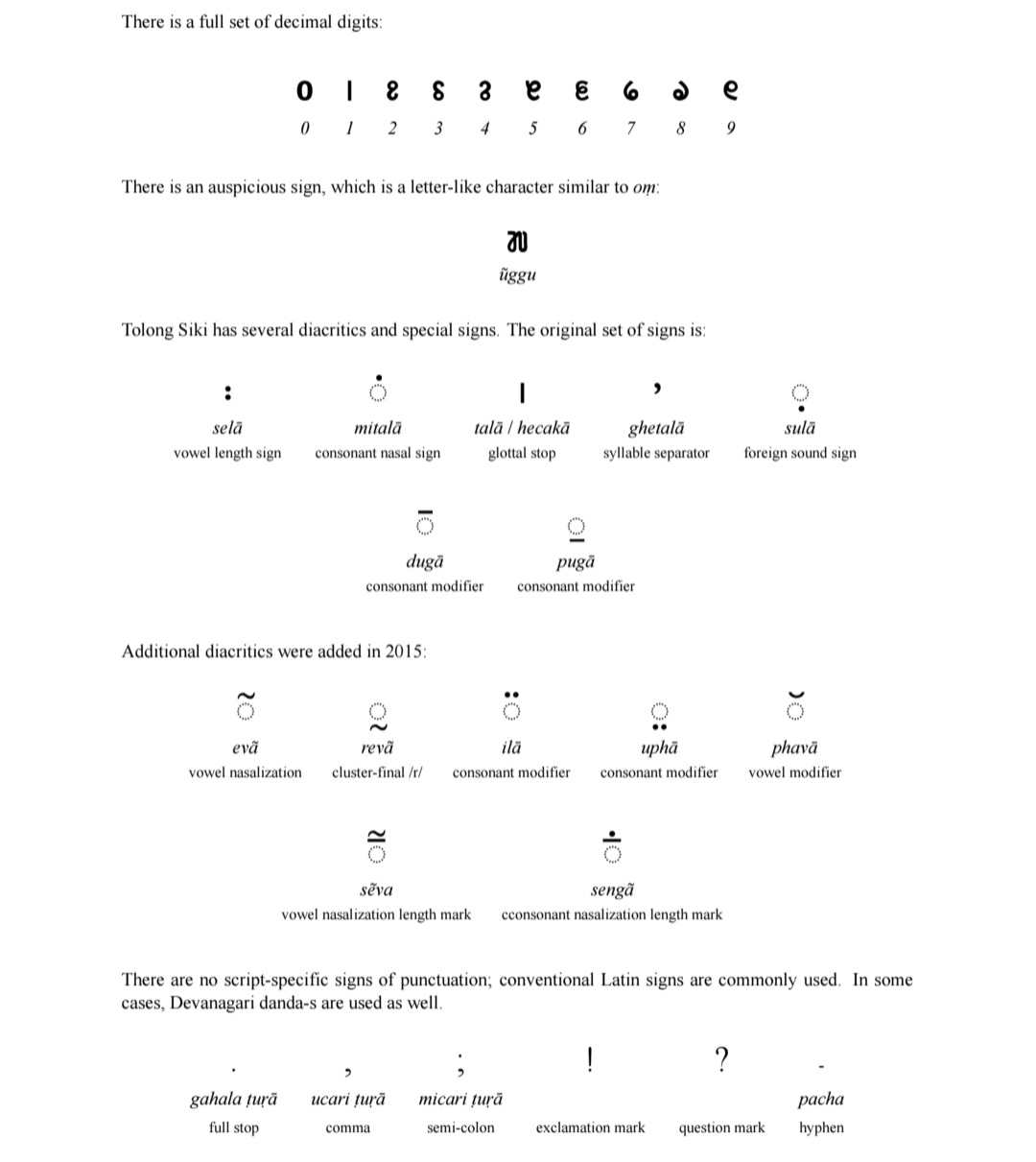
Tolong Siki Numerials & Signs [3]

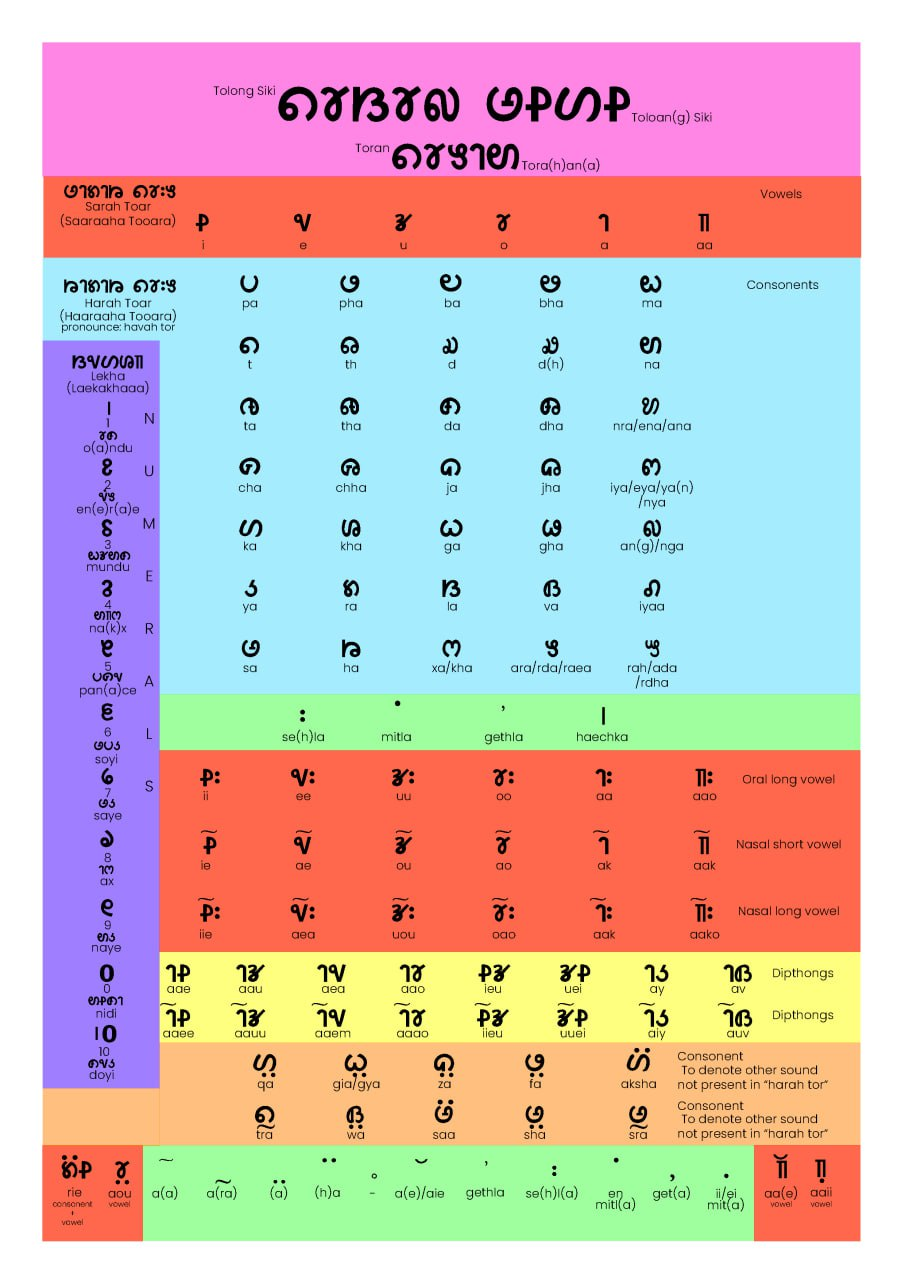
Tolong Siki Script [4] [5]

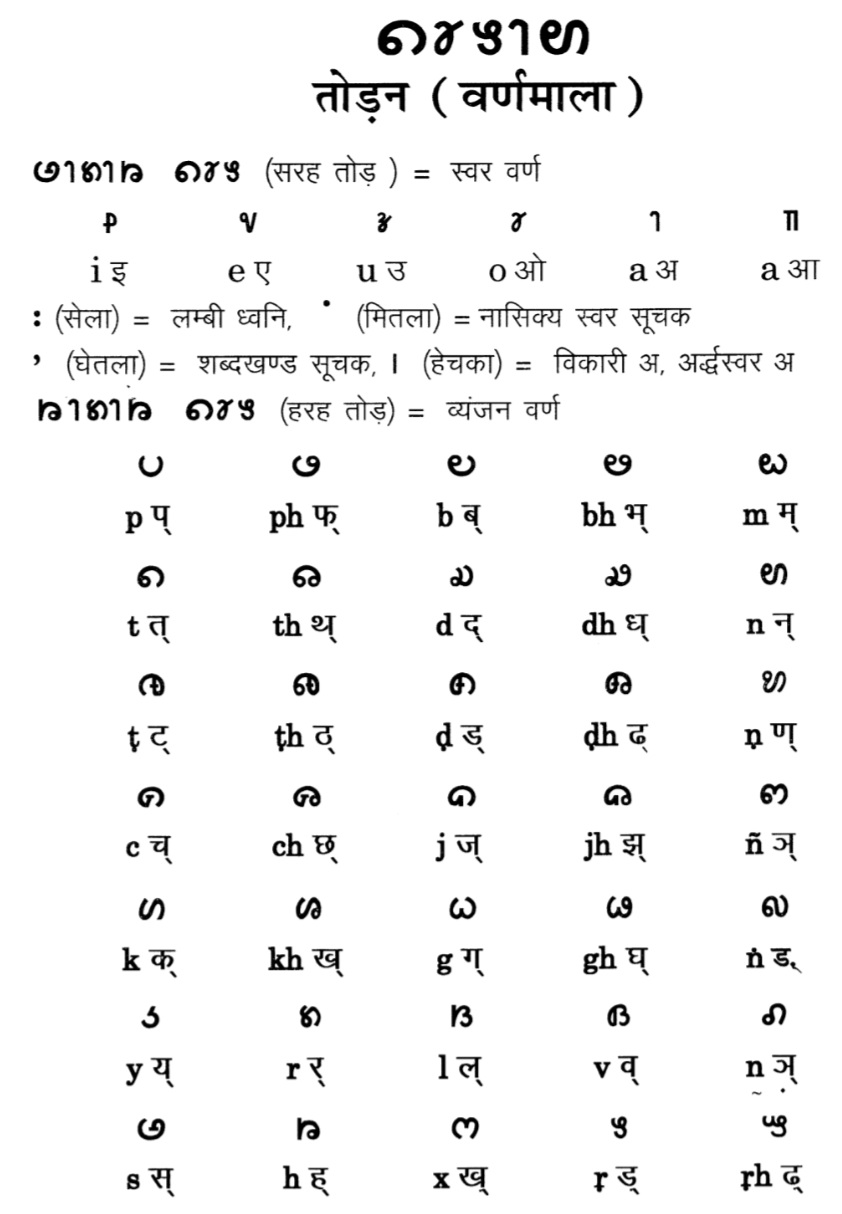
Tolong Siki alphabet

== See also ==
- Kurukh language
- Kurukh Banna
- Kurukh people
- Dravidian Languages
- Languages of India

== Sources ==
- Kobayashi, Masato; Tirkey, Bablu (2017). The Kurux Language. Boston: Brill. ISBN 978-90-04-34766-3.
