= Sumati Oraon =

Indian politician

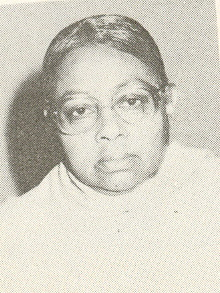

Member of Parliament, Lok Sabha
- In office 1982–1991
- Preceded by: Kartik Oraon
- Succeeded by: Lalit Oraon
- Constituency: Lohardaga, Bihar

Personal details
- Born: 15 February 1935 (age 91) Simdega, Gumla District, Bihar, British India
- Party: Indian National Congress
- Spouse: Kartik Oraon (m. 1950)
- Parent: Teju Bhagat (father)

Sumati Oraon (born 15 February 1935) is an Indian former politician for the Indian National Congress.

== Early life ==
Oraon was born on 15 February 1935 in Simdega in Gumla District. She was the daughter of Teju Bhagat.

== Political career ==
Oraon served as the Union Minister of State for Welfare between 1987 and 1988 and as the Union Minister of State for the Environment and Forests between 1988 and 1989. She was first elected to the Lok Sabha from the Lohardaga constituency in a 1982 by-election. She was re-elected in 1984 with 47% of the vote and again in 1989 with 59.17% of the vote. Oraon lost the 1991 election to Lalit Oraon, who won by a margin of 14.6%. She focused on the upliftment of the tribals in her constituency under the leadership of Rajiv Gandhi from 1984 to 1989. Oraon wrote a letter to the then-Prime Minister, P. V. Narasimha Rao during his tenure between 1991 and 1996 regarding the condition of the villagers of Sekuapani, a village in Gumla where the artillery shells of army practice drill fell, sometimes hurting the residents. The proposal of a permanent army cantonment was opposed in the area.

== Personal life ==
She married fellow politician Kartik Oraon and had one son and three daughters, including Geetashree Oraon.
