= Laloo Oraon =

Indian politician

Member of Parliament, Lok Sabha
- In office 1977–1980
- Preceded by: Kartik Oraon
- Succeeded by: Kartik Oraon
- Constituency: Lohardaga, Bihar

Personal details
- Born: 25 January 1942 Taku Patra Toli Village, Ranchi District, Bihar, British India
- Party: Janata Party
- Spouse: Jayanti

Laloo Oraon, also spelt Lalu, is an Indian politician. He was a Member of Parliament, representing Lohardaga, Bihar in the Lok Sabha the lower house of India's Parliament as a member of the Janata Party.
