= Kurukh Banna =

Abugida writing system of the Brahmic family

Kurukh Banna Kũṛux Bannā
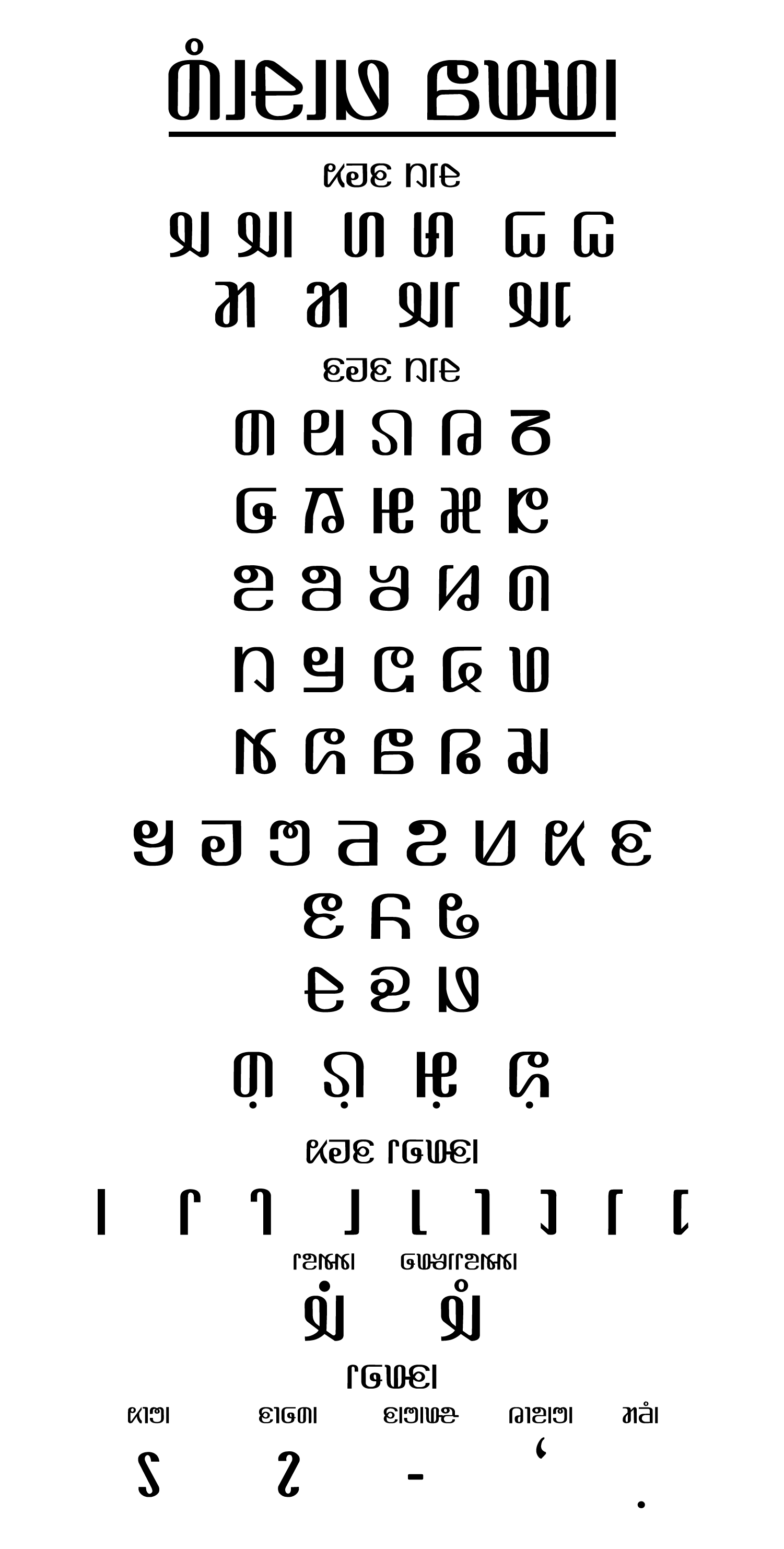
- Kurukh Banna Aksharamala (Alphabet Chart)
- Script type: Abugida
- Creator: Basudeo Ram Khalkho
- Period: 1991–present
- Direction: Left-to-right
- Languages: Kurukh

Related scripts
- Parent systems: Brahmic scripts: Northern Brahmic; Kurukh Banna

Kũṛux Bannā (IPA [kũɽux bənːaː]), or the Kurukh Banna or simply Banna Lipi, is an alphasyllabic neography used for writing the Kurukh language of the Oraon people in eastern India. It was invented by Basudeo Ram Khalkho based on Brahmic writing systems, and was released in 1991. The Banna script is written left-to-right and is composed of 48 primary characters and 10 numerals.

Since its creation in 1991, the Banna script has been revised twice, first in 1995, and latest in 1998. The script is mostly used in northern Odisha, with some users also in Jharkhand and West Bengal. The Banna script is the medium of instruction in a few Kurukh language schools. A number of educational materials, newspapers, magazines and literary works have been published in the Banna script. Some Kisan people have also adopted the script.

The Banna script has a 24% resemblance with northern Indic scripts. It is one of two competing scripts used to write the Kurukh language, the other being the alphabetical Tolong Siki, another neography which developed independently.

Demands have been made for the Banna script along with the Kurukh language to be given constitutional recognition in India. The script has also been proposed for Unicode inclusion.

== Etymology ==
The word bannā (Kurukh pronunciation: [bənːaː]) refers to the 'designs, figures and patterns' made on traditional clothes and tattooed on skin.

== History ==
Unpublished Bannā script primers from 1991

The earliest documented version of the Banna script dates back to 1991 in an unpublished primer, the Kũṛux Banna Lipi Arā Bakka Gaṛhan Part-1 (Kurukh Banna Script and Orthography Part-1), handwritten by Basudeo Ram Khalkho himself. The script was subsequently revised in 1995, and then latest in 1998, which remains the current version.

=== 1991–1994 ===
The 1991 version, that is, the very first version of the Banna script, with the arrangement of letters called toṛan, introduced with 10 vowels (and 9 vowel diacritics) along with the ṭippā sign (anusvara) and the selā sign (prolongation sign). It also included a glottal stop sign called talā, a halant (virama), and a visarga. This version had 31 consonants, and one ligature for tr [t̪r]. Notably, this version had only one nasal consonant, the na [n]. Another notable difference from the current version is that vowels were called tāl toṛ and consonants were called rayā toṛ in this initial version.

=== 1995–1997 ===
Unpublished Bannā script primers from 1995

The Banna script was revised in 1995, reshaping a few vowels, a few vowel diacritics, the prolongation sign, the glottal stop sign and a few consonants. The prolongation sign was now called raṭā, and the glottal stop sign was now called phaṭā. This revision notably introduced the candoṭippā sign (chandrabindu) for vowel nasalization. The halant (virama) was re-positioned. New consonants were added, like the ṣa [ʂ], and nasal consonants like ṅa [ŋ], the ña [ɲ], and the ṇa [ɳ]. A notable addition was the consonant xa [x] introduced for the first time in this script with the 1995 revision. Two new ligatures were added for kṣa [kʂ] and gya [gj]. The number of consonants now totaled to 36. The earliest documented version of numerals in the Banna script is from a 1995 unpublished primer, the Kũṛux Lipi Ṭuṛnā Paṛhnā (Kurukh Script Writing Reading) by Basudeo Ram Khalkho, which included the digits from 0 to 9.

In October 1997, a two-day conference was organized by the Interstate Kurukh (Oraon) Samaj Vikas Parishad in Jamshedpur, where the inventors of both Kurukh scripts were present, Basudeo Ram Khalkho (of the Kurukh Banna) and Dr. Narayan Oraon (of the Tolong Siki). A major topic of discussion was on the language and its script. The conference was inconclusive on choosing one script out of the contesting two, and that task remains incomplete till date.

=== 1998–present ===
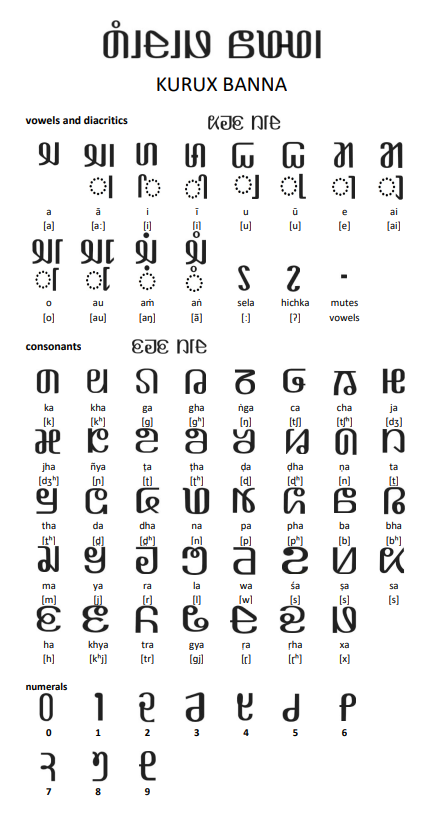
Kurukh Banna script chart

The Banna script was last revised in 1998, and this version remains in use till date. A number of vowels, vowel diacritics, consonants were reshaped. Numerals too were reshaped for compatibility with seven-segment displays. The ṭippā sign (anusvara) was re-positioned. The visarga sign was removed. Notably, a nukta sign was introduced in this version. The prolongation sign was renamed back to selā, and the glottal stop sign has since been called heckā. With the 1998 revision, vowels are called sarah toṛ and consonants are called harah toṛ.

In October 2012, the Banna script was consecrated with rituals at the Adi Dharam Parha Manda at Balijori, Rourkela. On the same occasion, the Kurukh Bhasha Vikas Parishad (Kurukh Language Development Council) was established, which pledged to promote and develop the Kurukh language and the Banna script.

In 2016–19, the Kurukh Banna script was digitized by Shyam Murmu, who also designed multiple fonts for it. In 2023 and 2024, proposals were made to the Unicode Consortium for encoding the script.

In recent years, tribal organizations like the All India Kurukh Parha Yubak Sangh (AIKPYS) in Rourkela have been demanding official recognition of the Kurukh language in Banna script in the Indian constitution's eighth schedule.

== Letters ==
The Banna script follows the arrangement order of most Brāhmic scripts, arranging its letters based on phonetic characteristics like the manner and place of articulation. This arrangement is called the toṛan.

=== Vowels ===
The vowels are called sarah toṛ. There are 12 independent vowel characters with 11 diacritics:

	Central		Front			Back			
	Mid		Open	Close					
Length →	Short				Long	Short		Long	
Independent form		a [ə]	ā [a]	i [i]	ī [iː]		u [u]		ū [uː]
Diacritic	^{1}	a [ə]	ā [a]	i [i]	ī [iː]		u [u]		ū [uː]
	Front		(Diphthong)	Back	(Diphthong)	(Diacritics)			
	Close-mid		(Diphthong)	Close-mid	(Diphthong)	(Diacritics)			
Length →	Short		(Diphthong)	Short	(Diphthong)	(Diacritics)			
Independent form		e [e]	ai [əi]	o [o]	au [əu]	^{2}	aṁ	^{3}	ã [ә̃]
Diacritic		e [e]	ai [əi]	o [o]	au [əu]		aṁ		[◌̃]

1. The vowel (a) does not have a diacritic, since all consonants have a [ə] as an inherent vowel.
2. The character (aṁ) is a representation of the ṭippā sign. Like the Anusvara, it is used to represent nasal consonants.
3. The character (ã) is a representation of the candoṭippā sign [◌̃] used for vowel nasalization (Chandrabindu).

Out of the 12 independent vowel characters, 2 are diphthongs and another 2 are just representations of diacritics. All 12 characters except 1 (the vowel a), have a vowel sign that can be affixed to the consonants. Apart from the above 12 vowels and corresponding 11 diacritics, there are also 3 other diacritics grouped under the sarah toṛ:

- The selā sign is used to elongate [ː] short vowels, particularly the vowels (e) and (o).
- The heckā sign is used to represent the glottal stop [ʔ] sound.
- The halant sign is used to mute the inherent vowel of consonants (Virama).

=== Consonants ===
The consonants are called harah toṛ and have an inherent vowel a (IPA [ə]). There are 36 consonant characters, which are arranged so:

		Stop				Nasal
Voicing →		Voiceless		Voiced		
Aspiration →		No	Yes	No	Yes	No
Velar		ka [k]	kha [kʰ]	ga [g]	gha [gʱ]	ṅa [ŋ]
Palatal		ca [tʃ]	cha [tʃʰ]	ja [dʒ]	jha [dʒʱ]	ña [ɲ]
Retroflex		ṭa [ʈ]	ṭha [ʈʰ]	ḍa [ɖ]	ḍha [ɖʱ]	ṇa [ɳ]
Dental		ta [t̪]	tha [t̪ʰ]	da [d̪]	dha [d̪ʱ]	na [n]
Labial		pa [p]	pha [pʰ]	ba [b]	bha [bʱ]	ma [m]
		Palatal	Alveolar		Labial-velar	
Voicing ↓	Aspiration ↓	Approx.	Trill	Lateral	Approx.	
Voiced	No	ya [j]	ra [r]	la [l]	wa [w]	
		Palatal	Retroflex	Alveolar	Glottal	
Voicing ↓	Aspiration ↓	Fricative				
Voiceless	Yes	śa [ʃ]	ṣa [ʂ]	sa [s]	ha [h]	
		Retroflex		Velar		
		Tap/flap		Fricative		
Voicing →		Voiced		Voiceless		
Aspiration →		No	Yes	No		
		ṛa [ɽ]	ṛha [ɽʱ]	xa [x]		

- Apart from the above 36 consonant characters, there are 3 consonant ligatures:
  - kṣa or khya (from k + ṣa).
  - tra (from t + ra).
  - jña or gya (from j + ña).
- The consonants śa, ṣa, kṣa / khya, tra and jña / gya are foreign sounds.
- The Banna script also has an ewā̃ sign used to modify certain consonants for foreign sounds. For example, ka, ga, ja, and pha can be modified into qa, ġa, za, and fa respectively (Nuqta).

Schwa deletion: While the inherent vowel a (schwa IPA [ə]) of a consonant can be muted or deleted by explicitly marking the halant sign after it, such is not always done. Even in the non-usage of the halant, implicitly in the Banna script, the final schwa is always deleted, while the middle schwa is both sometimes retained and sometimes deleted.

=== Diacritics ===
Diacritics on ka

The table below shows the consonant ka with combined with diacritics and their transliteration. Vowels in their independent form on the top and in their corresponding diacritic combined with the consonant on the bottom.

a	ā	i	ī	u	ū	e	ē	ai	o	ō	au	aṁ	ã			
ka	kā	ki	kī	ku	kū	ke	kē	kai	ko	kō	kau	kaṁ	kã	ka'	k	qa

In the absence of any diacritic affixed, the consonant takes the form of being inherently combined with the vowel a.

== Numerals ==
The numbers, called gan or ganatī, are:

Kurukh Banna digits
nidī	ond	ẽṛ	mūnd	nāx	pañce	soy	say	āx	nay
0	1	2	3	4	5	6	7	8	9

== Unicode ==
The Kurukh Banna script does not have Unicode support yet. A preliminary proposal to encode the script to Unicode was made in May 2023, which was revised in February 2024.

== Contestation with Tolong Siki ==
A challenge expressed by the Unicode Technical Committee in dealing with proposals for encoding the Kurukh Banna script is the parallel use of another neography, the Tolong Siki for the same language. In an interstate conference of Kurukh people held in 1997, the issue of selecting one script out of the two for standardization remained inconclusive. In later years, the Tolong Siki received official recognition in the Indian states of Jharkhand (in 2003) and West Bengal (in 2017), while the Banna script lacks official support till date. Meanwhile, the proposal to encode Tolong Siki has already been accepted by the Unicode Technical Committee and received support in Unicode version 17.0, while Kurukh Banna remains in the proposal stage.

== See also ==
- Kurukh language
- North Dravidian languages
- Constructed writing systems
- Abugida scripts
- Tolong Siki
- List of endangered languages in India
