= Kurukh language =

North Dravidian language of eastern India

Kurukh
- Kurux, Oraon, Uraon
- 𑷊𑶲̃𑷗𑶲𑷖 কুড়ুখ্ , କୁଡ଼ୁଖ୍
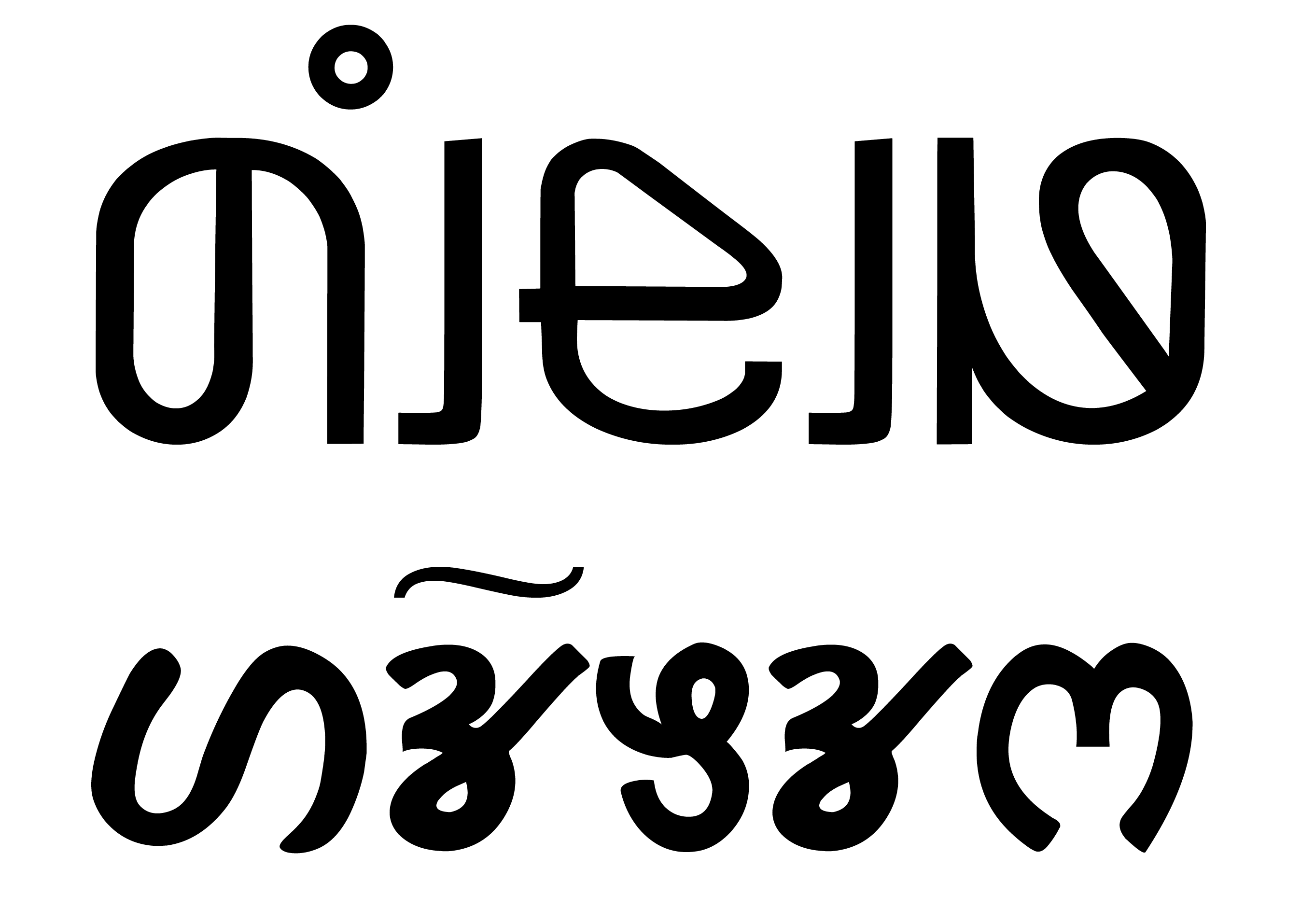
- 'Kuṛux' or 'Kuṁṛux' in Kurukh Banna alphabet (top) and Tolong Siki alphabet (bottom)
- Pronunciation: [kũɽux]
- Native to: India, Bangladesh, and Nepal
- Region: Jharkhand, West Bengal, Chhattisgarh, Assam, Bihar, Tripura, Odisha
- Ethnicity: Kurukh; Kisan
- Native speakers: 2.28 million (2002–2011)
- Language family: Dravidian: Northern Dravidian; Kurukh–Malto; Kurukh
- Dialects: Oraon; Kisan; Dhangar
- Writing system: Kurukh script; Tolong Siki; Kurukh Banna; Devanagari; Odia

Official status
- Official language in: India: Jharkhand (additional); West Bengal (additional)

Language codes
- ISO 639-2: kru
- ISO 639-3: Either: kru – Kurux xis – Kisan
- Glottolog: kuru1301
- ELP: Nepali Kurux
- Distribution of Kurukh speakers in Blue.

- Kurukh is classified as Vulnerable by the UNESCO Atlas of the World's Languages in Danger

Kurukh (/ˈkʊrʊx/ or /ˈkʊrʊk/; IPA: [kũɽux]), also Kurux, Oraon or Uranw (IPA: [uraːũ̯]), is a North Dravidian language spoken by the Kurukh (Oraon) and Kisan people of East India. It is spoken by about two million people in the Indian states of Jharkhand, Chhattisgarh, Odisha, West Bengal, Assam and Tripura, as well as by 65,000 in northern Bangladesh, 28,600 of a dialect called Uranw in Nepal and about 5,000 in Bhutan.

The most closely related language to Kurukh is Malto; together with Brahvi, all three languages form the North Dravidian branch of the Dravidian language family. It is marked as being in a "vulnerable" state in UNESCO's list of endangered languages. The Kisan dialect has 206,100 speakers as of 2011.

== Etymology ==
According to Edward Tuite Dalton, "Oraon" is an exonym assigned by neighbouring Munda people, meaning "to roam". They call themselves Kurukh. According to Sten Konow, Uraon will mean man as in the Dravidian Kurukh language, the word Urapai, Urapo and Urang means Man. The word Kurukh may be derived from the word Kur or Kurcana, which means "shout" and "stammer". So Kurukh will mean 'a speaker'.

=== Name ===
The Kurukh language is also variously known as Kuṛux, Kuruḵẖ, Kurukh, Kunrukh, Kurka, Kadukali, Urang, Oraon, Uraon, Urāo, and Orāỗ. Other designations include Dhakad, Dhangad, Dhanka, and Kuda, in Madhya Pradesh, and Dhangar, and Kisan, even Malto, Berga, Dhangri, Khendroi and Kisan, but some scholars consider them synonymous with Kurukh itself. George van Driem reported that the Dhangar and Jhangar "dialect [of Kurukh]" was spoken in eastern Nepalese Terai, separating it in areas: to the east of the Kosi River, the language is known as Jhangar (Jhāṅgaḍ), while to the west it is called Dhangar (Dhāṅgaḍ, Dhāṅgar).

However, Dravidologist Kamil Zvelebil reported that Dhangar (alternatively, Jhanger, Jangad, Orau, Oraon, and Uraon), reported from South Nepal, differed from Kurux (Oraon) proper. Ethnologue also treats the Dhangar from Nepal as "distinct" from the language spoken in India and Bangladesh.

== Classification ==
Kurukh belongs to the Northern Dravidian group of the Dravidian family languages, and is closely related to Sauria Paharia and Kumarbhag Paharia, which are often together referred to as Malto.

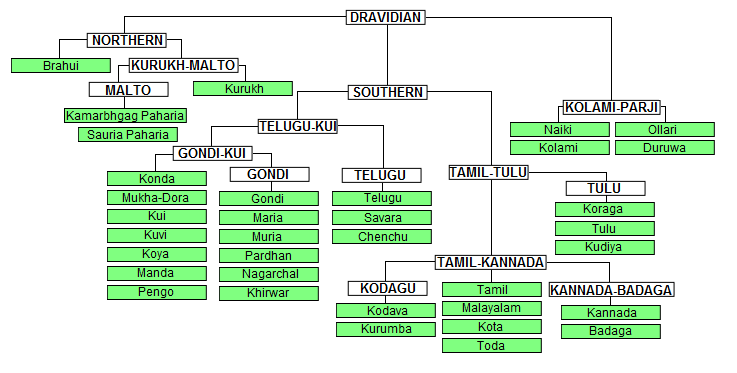
Dravidian language tree

== Writing systems ==
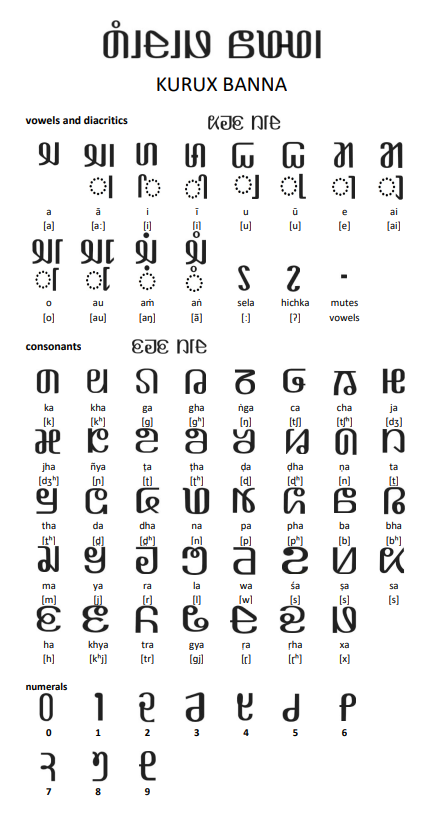
Kurukh Banna script chart for the Kurukh language

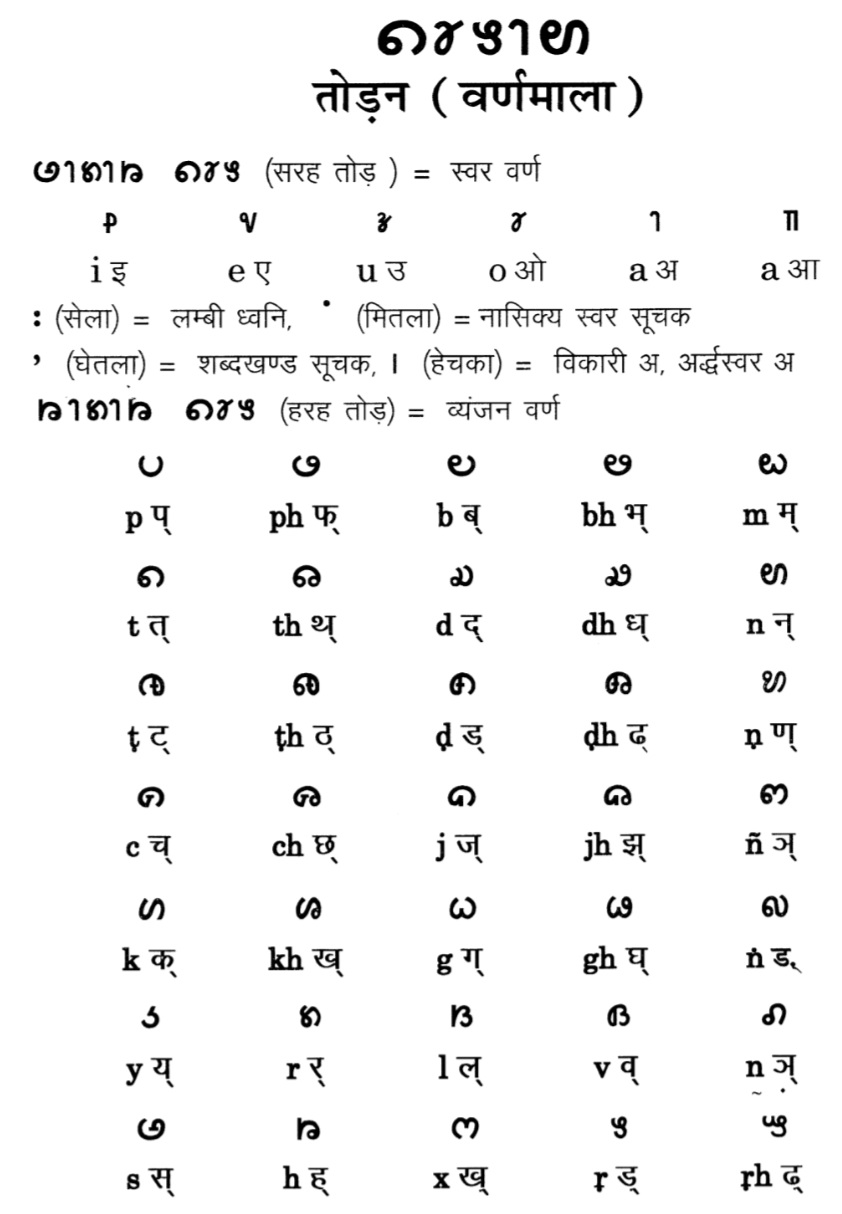
Tolong Siki script (bold), next to Devanagari and Latin script

Kurukh is written in Devanagari, a script also used to write Sanskrit, Hindi, Marathi, Nepali and other Indo-Aryan languages.

In 1991, Basudev Ram Khalkho from Odisha released the Kurukh Banna script. In Sundargarh district of Odisha, the Kurukh Banna alphabet is taught and promoted by Kurukh Parha. Fonts have been developed and people use it widely in books, magazines and other material. The alphabet is also used by Oraon people in the states of Chhattisgarh, West Bengal, Jharkhand and Assam.

In 1999, Narayan Oraon, a doctor, invented the alphabetic Tolong Siki script specifically for Kurukh. Many books and magazines have been published in Tolong Siki, and it saw official recognition by the state of Jharkhand in 2007. The Kurukh Literary Society of India has been instrumental in spreading the Tolong Siki script for Kurukh literature.

== Geographical distribution ==
Distribution of Kurukh in India, 2011 census
1. Jharkhand (47.9%)
2. Chhattisgarh (26.0%)
3. West Bengal (8.65%)
4. Odisha (6.84%)
5. Bihar (4.43%)
6. Assam (3.69%)
7. Other (2.51%)

According to the Language Atlas of India, based on 1991 data, speakers of Oraon/Kurukh existed in the hundred thousands in the Indian states of Bihar, Madhya Pradesh, and West Bengal. By the 2011 Census, a significant number of speakers is reported in Jharkand, Chhattisgarh, West Bengal, and Odisha, among others.

In India, Kurukh is mostly spoken in Raigarh, Surguja, Jashpur of Chhattisgarh, Gumla, Ranchi, Lohardaga, Latehar, Simdega of Jharkhand; Jharsuguda, Sundargarh and Sambalpur district of Odisha.

It is also spoken in Jalpaiguri district of West Bengal, as well as Assam and Tripura states by Kurukh who are mostly tea-garden workers.

== Speakers ==
Kurukh folk song about hunting. Recorded in West Bengal, India

The Language Atlas of India reported 1,426,618 speakers in 1991, and 19,88,350 speakers in 2011.

It is spoken by 2,053,000 people from the Oraon and Kisan tribes, with 1,834,000 and 219,000 speakers respectively. The literacy rate is 23% in Oraon and 17% in Kisan. Despite the large number of speakers, the language is considered to be endangered. The governments of Jharkhand and Chhattisgarh have introduced the Kurukh language in schools with majority Kurukhar students. Jharkhand and West Bengal both list Kurukh as an official language of their respective states. Bangladesh also has some speakers.

== Phonology ==
=== Vowels ===
Kurukh has five cardinal vowels. Each vowel has long, short nasalized and long nasalized counterparts.

Kurukh simple vowels
	Front	Central	Back
High	i		u
Mid	e		o
Low		a	

=== Consonants ===
The table below illustrates the articulation of the consonants.

Kurukh consonants
			Labial	Dental/ Alveolar	Retroflex	Palatal	Velar	Glottal
Nasal			m	n	(ɳ)	ɲ	ŋ	
Plosive/ Affricate	voiceless	plain	p	t	ʈ	tʃ	k	ʔ
Plosive/ Affricate	voiceless	aspirated	pʰ	tʰ	ʈʰ	tʃʰ	kʰ	
Plosive/ Affricate	voiced	plain	b	d	ɖ	dʒ	ɡ	
Plosive/ Affricate	voiced	aspirated	bʱ	dʱ	ɖʱ	dʒʱ	ɡʱ	
Fricative				s		(ʃ)	x (Note: In Kurukh, the modern voiceless velar fricative /x/ developed diachronically from an ancestral geminated voiceless velar plosive /kː/.)	h
Rhotic		plain		ɾ	ɽ (Note: In Kurukh, the modern voiced retroflex flap /ɽ/ developed diachronically from an ancestral geminated voiced retroflex plosive /ɖː/.)			
Rhotic		aspirated			ɽʱ			
Glide			w	l (Note: Driven by intensive language contact with neighboring Indo-Aryan languages that lack the retroflex lateral, Kurukh underwent a phonemic merger where the voiced retroflex lateral */ɭ/ shifted entirely into the voiced alveolar lateral /l/.)		j (Note: Driven by intensive language contact with neighboring Indo-Aryan languages that lack retroflex non-stops, Kurukh underwent a phonemic merger where the unique acoustic voiced retroflex approximant */ɻ/ shifted into the voiced palatal approximant /j/ or sometimes voiced retroflex flap /ɽ/ that can traced.)		

- Medially voiced aspirates and voiced plosives + /h/ contrast, there are some minimal pairs like /dʱandha:/ "astonishment" and /dʱandʱa:/ "exertion". Clusters of voiced aspirates and /h/ are possible too as in /madʒʱhi:/ "middle" and /madʒʱis/ "zamindar's agent".
- Of the nasals, /m, n/ are phonemic; [ɳ] only occurs before retroflex plosives; /ŋ/ mostly occurs before other velars but can occur finally with deletion of previous /g/, there are cases where /ŋg/ and /ng/ contrast; /ɲ/ mostly occurs before post alveolars but /j/ can become /ɲ/ around nasal vowels as in /paɲɲa:/ (or /pãjja:/).

== Morphology ==
Kurukh, like other Dravidian languages, is an agglutinative language. The sentence structure is Subject-Object-Verb (SOV). In its morphological construction, there is suffixation but there are no infixes or prefixes.

=== Pronouns ===
The pronominal system of Kurukh is highly regular, agglutinative, and strongly preserves ancient Proto-Dravidian structures, remaining free from neighboring Indo-Aryan grammatical influences. In Kurukh grammar, personal pronouns change based on singular and plural numbers, and their basic nominative forms historically feature long vowels. A complete structural analysis of these forms, including full case declension tables, internal increments, and sound changes, is documented on the dedicated pronouns sub-page.

The language maintains a strict clusivity distinction in the first-person plural, separating the exclusive form ēm (we, excluding the listener) and the inclusive form nām (we, including the listener). Structurally, because an inclusive meaning naturally requires a group of speech participants, an inclusive singular form is morphologically impossible. Furthermore, personal and reflexive pronouns do not take case suffixes directly onto their nominative forms. Instead, the language uses a systematic sound mutation where the underlying long vowels undergo shortening, and specific internal consonants are added based on number; singular forms add a nasal velar augment -ṅ(g)-, while plural forms undergo nasal labial gemination -m(m)- to act as an oblique base buffer before case markers are attached.

Third-person references function entirely through a five-vowel demonstrative system inherited from Proto-Dravidian, as the language lacks independent third-person roots. This system coordinates physical distance using distal ā-, proximal ī-, and medial ū- bases, while handling conversational awareness through interrogative ē- and relative ō- bases. Additionally, the reflexive pronouns tān (singular) and tām (plural) serve a dual purpose. Beyond normal self-reference, they function as logophoric pronouns in reported speech to track identity across long narratives, eliminating any syntactic ambiguity about whether a speaker is referring to themselves or someone else.

Kurukh pronouns
Person / Type	Singular	Plural (exclusive)	Plural (inclusive)
First person	ēn (I)	ēm (We, excluding you)	nām (We, including you)
Second person	nīn (You)	nīm (You all)	
Third person (distal)	ās (Masc.) ād (Fem./Neut.)	ār / abṛar (Human) abṛā (Non-human)	
Reflexive / Logophoric	tān (Oneself)	tām (Themselves)	

=== Nouns ===
Kurukh nouns have three grammatical genders, namely masculine, feminine and neuter. To the Kurukh only men are masculine; women and goddesses (evil spirits) are feminine; all others are neutral. Masculine nouns of the third person singular have two forms, the indefinite and the definite. The indefinite is the simplest form of the noun, thus āl man. The definite form is made by adding -as for the singular, thus ālas, ("the man").

There are only two grammatical numbers, the singular and the plural.

The following is an example declension table for a masculine noun "āl", meaning "man"

Case	Singular	Definite	Plural
Nominative	āl	ālas	ālar
Genitive	āl	ālas gahi	ālar gahi
Dative	āl	ālas gē	ālar gē
Accusative	ālan	ālasin	ālarin
Ablative	āltī	ālas tī	ālartī , ālarintī
Instrumental	āl trī, āl trū	-	ālar ṭrī, ālar trū
Vocative	ē ālayо̄	-	ē ālarо̄
Locative	āl	ālas nū	ālar nū

The feminine declension is almost identical to the masculine, but lacks a definite form. The following example is for "mukkā" ("woman").

Case	Singular	Plural
Nominative	mukkā	mukkar
Genitive	mukkā gahi	mukkar gahi
Dative	mukkāgē	mukkar gē
Accusative	mukkan	mukkarin
Ablative	mukkantī	mukkartī , mukkarintī
Instrumental	mukkā trī, mukkā trū	mukkar trī, mukkar trū
Vocative	ē mukkai	ē mukkarо̄
Locative	mukkā nū	mukkar nū

The neuter declension for "allā" ("dog") shows almost identical singular forms, but a difference in pluralization.

Case	Singular	Plural
Nominative	allā	allā guṭhi
Genitive	allā gahi	allā guṭhi gahi
Dative	allā gē	allā guṭhi gē
Accusative	allan	allā guṭhin
Ablative	allantī	allā guṭhi tī , allā guṭhintī
Instrumental	allā trī, allā trū	allā guṭhi trī, allā guṭhi trū
Vocative	ē allā	ē allā guṭhi
Locative	allā nū	allā guṭhi nū

== Education ==
The Kurukh language is taught as a subject in the schools of Jharkhand, Chhattishgarh, Madhya Pradesh, Odisha, West Bengal and Assam.

== Sample phrases ==
Phrases	English Translation
Nighai endra naame?	What is your name?
Neen ekase ra'din?	How are you? (Girl)
Neen ekase ra'dai?	How are you? (Boy)
Een korem ra'dan.	I am fine.
Neen ekshan kalalagdin?	Where are you going? (Girl)
Neen ekshan kalalagday?	Where are you going? (Boy)
Endra manja?	What happened?
Ha'an	Yes
Malla	No
Een mokha Lagdan.	I am eating.
Neen mokha.	You eat.
Neen ona.	You drink
Aar mokha lagnar.	They are eating.
Daw makha	Good Night

== Sample text ==
=== English ===
All human beings are born free and equal in dignity and rights. They are endowed with reason and conscience and should act towards one another in a spirit of brotherhood.

=== Devanagari script ===
होर्मा आलारिन् हक् गहि बारे नू मल्लिन्ता अजादि अरा आण्टें मन्ना गहि हक़् ख़खर्कि रै। आरिन् लुर् अरा जिया गहि दव् बौसा ख़खकि रै अरा तम्है मझि नू मेल्-प्रें गहि बेव्हार् नन्ना चहि।

=== Latin script ===
Hōrmā ālārin hak gahi bāre nū mallintā azādi arā aṅṭēm mannā gahi haq xakharki raī. Ārin lur arā jiyā gahi dav bausā xakhakī raī arā tamhai majhi nū mēl-prēm gahi bēvhār nannā nā cahi.

== Alternative names and dialects ==
Kurukh has a number of alternative names such as Uraon, Kurux, Kunrukh, Kunna, Urang, Morva, and Birhor. Two dialects, Oraon and Kisan, have 73% intelligibility between them. Oraon but not Kisan is currently being standardised. Kisan is currently endangered, with a rate of decline of 12.3% from 1991 to 2001.

== Sources ==
- Kobayashi, Masato; Tirkey, Bablu (2017). The Kurux Language. Boston: Brill. ISBN 978-90-04-34766-3.
- Kurukh Grammer by the Rev. Ferdiand Hahn
- The Dravidian Languages by Bhadriraju Krishnamurti Grignard's Kurukh Classification.
- Hahn, Ferdinand (1911). Kurukh Grammar. Bengal Secretariat Press.
- van Driem, George (2001). "Zagrosians and Indo-Europeans". Languages of the Himalayas. Vol. 2. Brill. pp. 994–1176. ISBN 978-90-04-51492-8.
