= Chainpur block, Gumla =

Chainpur
- Community development block
- Coordinates: 23.1456°N 84.2393°E
- Country: India
- State: Jharkhand
- District: Gumla

Government
  - Type: Federal democracy

Area
  - Total: 471.41 km^{2} (182.01 sq mi)

Population (2011)
  - Total: 56,591
  - Density: 120.05/km^{2} (310.92/sq mi)

Languages
  - Official: Hindi, Urdu
- Time zone: UTC+5:30 (IST)
- PIN: 835206
- Telephone/STD code: 06524
- Vehicle registration: JH 07
- Literacy: 71.22%
- Lok Sabha constituency: Lohardaga
- Vidhan Sabha constituency: Gumla
- Website: gumla.nic.in

Chainpur block is a CD block that forms an administrative division in the Chainpur subdivision of Gumla district, in the Indian state of Jharkhand.

== History ==
Before 1920 Chainpur was a part of Kulmunda Estate and ruled by the Khawas (khas) zamindars and Jagidars of the Kulmunda estate.

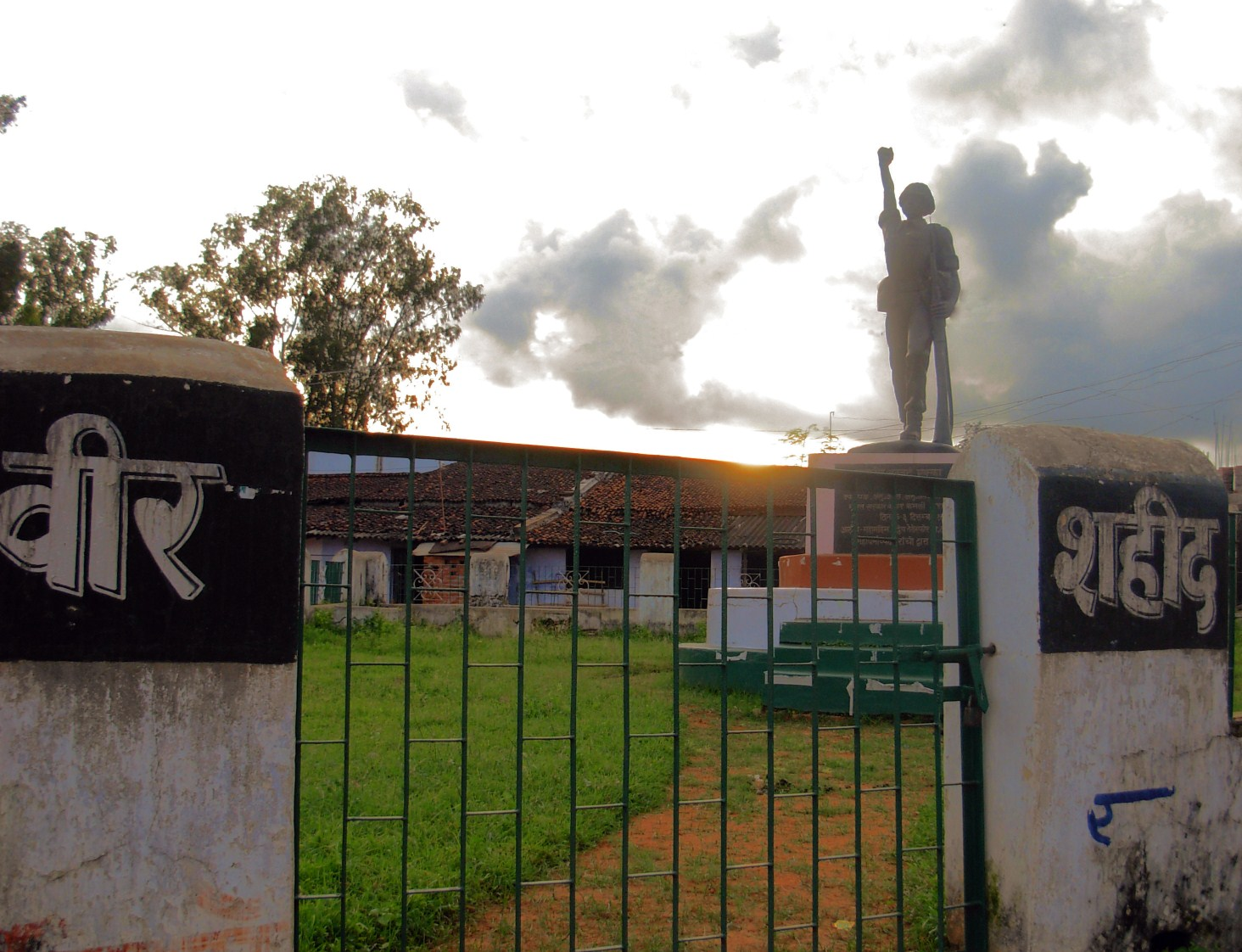
Statue of Albert Ekka at Chainpur

Albert Ekka, was born in village Jari, earlier in Chainpur CD block, now in Albert Ekka (Jari) CD block. He was posthumously awarded the Param Vir Chakra, India's highest award for valour in the face of the enemy.

Gumla became a subdivision of Ranchi district in 1902 and it became a separate district in 1983. Simdega district was carved out of Gumla district in 2011. Subsequently, Gumla district was divided into three subdivisions – Gumla Sadar subdivision (with Gumla, Ghaghra, Bharno, Bishunpur, Raidih and Sisia blocks), Basia subdivision (with Palkot, Basia and Kamdara blocks), and Chainpur subdivision (with Chainpur, Albert Ekka (Jari) and Dumri blocks).

== Maoist activities ==
The Maoist insurgency started spreading around the mid-1990s and poses a big challenge to peace and development of the district. It “is involved in abduction, extortion, extortion killings.” The banned organisation is active largely in the eastern part of the district mainly in Kamadara, Basia, Palkot, Gumla, Raidih, Sisai and Bharno police stations. In order to counter the activities of the insurgents, arms, ammunition and security equipment have been provided in every police station. It includes bulletproof and landmine-proof vehicles.

But before 1990 no Maoist existed in this region. When local indigenous people got looted. Their lands were taken forcefully, they were treated as a labour in their own villages for a time of Food. They have to migrate to big cities in Search of job, some of them were sold. Government never listen to them they only take votes and a lots of resources worth trillions of dollars annually. The indigenous people feel like they are being cheated. They opposed about it in front of the government but government fired bullets on them. On 10 October 1968 police in Chainpur fired multiple round of bullets on a crowd of Birsa Seva Dal organized big gathering of peaceful protesters. Even nowadays they are being cheated by the local shopkeepers. The shopkeepers do a lots of fraud like in weight, duplicate. They take full money and give less or duplicate goods. They take the disadvantage of uneducated local people. Because government never provided education to them. The police, local officers and other governmental officers never supported them. The contractors builds low quality of infrastructure worth a lots of money. He eats rest of the money, a big scam over the local people's money. People of this region believe in movement against corruption and injustice.

== Geography ==
In the southern portion of Gumla district, there are flat topped hills called pat, with an elevation ranging from 2,500 feet to 3,000 feet. The pat region is spread across Bishunpur, Chainpur and Ghaghra CD blocks. The highest areas are Netarhat pat (3,356 ft), Lamiti pat (3,777 ft) and Galgat pat (3,823 ft). The rest of the district occupies a part of the Ranchi Plateau with an average elevation of 2,300 feet.

Three major rivers flowing through Gumla district are North Koel River, South Koel River and Sankh River.

Sadni Falls (also called Sadnighagh Falls) is located about 3 kilometres (1.9 mi) from Rajadera village.

Chainpur CD block is bounded by Bishunpur and Ghaghra CD blocks on the north, Gumla CD block on the east, Raidih and Albert Ekka (Jari) CD blocks on the south, and Dumri CD block on the west.

Chainpur CD block has an area of 471.41 km^{2}.Chainpur police station serves Chainpur CD block. The headquarters of Chainpur CD block is located at Chainpur village.

== Demographics ==
=== Population ===
According to the 2011 Census of India, Chainpur CD block had a total population of 56,591, all of which were rural. There were 28,397 (50%) males and 28194 (50%) females. Population in the age range 0–6 years was 9,646. Scheduled Castes numbered 778 (1.37%) and Scheduled Tribes numbered 46,320 (81.85%).

=== Literacy ===
According to the 2011 census, the total number of literate persons in Chainpur CD block was 33,432 (71.22% of the population over 6 years) out of which males numbered 18,815 (79.87% of the male population over 6 years) and females numbered 14,617 (62.50% of the female population over 6 years). The gender disparity (the difference between female and male literacy rates) was 17.37%.

As of 2011 census, literacy in Gumla district was 66.92%. Literacy in Jharkhand was 67.63% in 2011. Literacy in India in 2011 was 74.04%.

See also – List of Jharkhand districts ranked by literacy rate

Literacy in CD Blocks of
Gumla district
Gumla Sadar subdivision
Gumla – 72.28%
Ghaghra – 57.56%
Bharno – 58.24%
Bishunpur – 57.95%
Raidih – 68.98%
Sisai – 63.06%
Basia subdivision
Palkot – 61.55
Kamdara – 68.51%
Basia – 67.66%
Chainpur subdivision
Chainpur –71.22%
Dumri – 69.83%
Albert Ekka (Jari) –71.43%
Source: 2011 Census: CD block Wise
Primary Census Abstract Data

=== Language and religion ===
Religions in Chainpur block (2011)
Religion	Percent
Christianity	48.89%
Sarna	34.10%
Hinduism	13.42%
Islam	3.33%
Other or not stated	0.26%

According to the Population by Religious Communities 2011 data, in the Chainpur subdistrict, Christians numbered 27,670 and formed 48.89% of the population, followed by: (number of persons and percentage of population in brackets) ‘Other religious communities’ (19,299/ 34.10), Hindus (7,594/ 13.42%), Muslims (1,885/ 3.33%), and persons who did not state their religion (55/ 0.10%).

Scheduled Tribes numbered 706,754 and formed 68.94% of the total population of Gumla district. Within the scheduled tribes the more populous tribes were (percentage of ST population in 2011 in brackets): Oraon, Dhangars (62.63%), Munda, Patars (11.70%), Kharia, Dhelki Kharia, Dudh Kharia, Hill Kharia (9.07%), Lohras (5.77%) and Chik Baraik (2.57%).

Languages in Chainpur block (2011)
1. Kurukh (53.1%)
2. Sadri (37.7%)
3. Hindi (3.29%)
4. Others (5.96%)

According to the Population by Mother Tongue 2011 data, in the Chainpur subdistrict, Kurukh was the mother-tongue of 30,035 persons forming 53.07% of the population, followed by (number of persons and percentage of population in brackets), Hindi (23,290/ 41.15%), Mundari (418/ 7.74%), persons with other languages as mother-tongue (2,848/ 5.03%). Persons with Hindi as mother-tongue included 18,110 persons having Sadri/ Sadan, 3,213 persons having Nagpuri, as mother-tongue.

Note: An attempt has been made to include all language groups each with at least 300 persons as their mother-tongue and only those groups with less than 300 persons as their mother-tongue in the census data are normally included in the “other languages” category. Comparatively smaller language groups with 200+ persons as their mother-tongue are mentioned in the text. Many languages have sub-groups. Those who are interested can see the reference for more details. The census data for this page has a large amount for “other languages”, without any information about what it includes.

Hindi is the official language in Jharkhand and Urdu has been declared as an additional official language.

== Economy ==
=== Overview ===
80% and over of the population of Gumla district were in the BPL category in 2004–2005. In 2011–12, the proportion of BPL population in Gumla district came down to 36.75%. According to a study in 2013 (modified in 2019), "the incidence of poverty in Jharkhand is estimated at 46%, but 60% of the scheduled castes and scheduled tribes are still below poverty line."

=== Livelihood ===
Livelihood
in Chainpur CD block
1. Cultivators (75.4%)
2. Agricultural labourers (15.7%)
3. Household industries (2.11%)
4. Other Workers (7.70%)

In Chainpur CD block in 2011, amongst the class of total workers, cultivators numbered 21,123 and formed 75.40%, agricultural labourers numbered 4,448 and formed 15.69%, household industry workers numbered 599 and formed 2.11% and other workers numbered 2,183 and formed 7.70%. Total workers numbered 28,353 and formed 50.10% of the total population, and non-workers numbered 28,238 and formed 49.90% of the population.

=== Infrastructure ===
There are 83 inhabited villages in Chainpur CD block. In 2011, 3 villages had power supply. 2 villages had tap water (treated/ untreated), 82 villages had well water (covered/ uncovered), 76 villages had hand pumps, and all villages have drinking water facility. 7 villages had post offices, 8 villages had sub post offices, 1 village had telephone (land line), 19 villages had mobile phone coverage. 83 villages had pucca (paved) village roads, 11 villages had bus service (public/ private), 5 villages had autos/ modified autos, 4 villages had taxi/vans, 11 villages had tractors. 2 villages had bank branches, 3 villages had agricultural credit societies, 27 villages had public distribution system.

=== Agriculture ===
In Gumla district, only three CD blocks, namely Sisai, Bharno and Kamdara, have plain lands. Rest of the district is mostly undulating in nature. Forests cover around 27% of the total area. About 35% of the total geographical area of the district is under cultivation. Out of 3.296 lakh hectare cultivable lands, only 22,056 hectare of land is under assured irrigation coverage. “The main economy of the village depends upon agriculture, forest produce, cattle development, and other labour activities...” About 70% farmers belong to the small and marginal category and have small plots scattered all around. Percentages of landless farmers are negligible.

=== Bauxite mining ===
Bauxite and laterite (aluminium ore) is found in “villages of Amtipani, Langdatanr, Chirodih, Jalim, Narma, Bahagara and Gurdari of Bishunpur block, Langatanr, Lupungpat and Chota-agiatu in Chainpur block and Hanrup, Serangdag and Jalim in Ghaghra block. The total number of bauxite mines is twenty one”.

=== Backward Regions Grant Fund ===
Gumla district is listed as a backward region and receives financial support from the Backward Regions Grant Fund. The fund, created by the Government of India, is designed to redress regional imbalances in development. As of 2012, 272 districts across the country were listed under this scheme. The list includes 21 districts of Jharkhand.

== Education ==
Chainpur CD block had 16 villages with pre-primary schools, 78 villages with primary schools, 39 villages with middle schools, 6 villages with secondary schools, 2 villages with senior secondary schools, 1 village with general degree college, 5 villages had no educational facility.
.*Senior secondary schools are also known as Inter colleges in Jharkhand

There is only one hospital in whole Chainpur block, contains 10 panchayats and hundreds of villages.
