= Serangdag =

- Village
- Location in Jharkhand, India Serangdag (India)
- Coordinates: 23.364048°N 84.453768°E
- Country: India
- State: Jharkhand
- District: Gumla

Government
  - Type: Federal democracy

Population (2011)
  - Total: 1,091

Languages *
  - Official: Hindi, Urdu
- Time zone: UTC+5:30 (IST)
- PIN: 835220
- Telephone/ STD code: 06524
- Vehicle registration: JH 07
- Literacy: 37.12%
- Lok Sabha constituency: Lohardaga
- Vidhan Sabha constituency: Bishunpur
- Website: gumla.nic.in

Serangdag is a village/ Bauxite mining centre in the Ghaghra CD block in the Gumla subdivision of the Gumla district in the Indian state of Jharkhand.

== Geography ==
Cities, towns and locations in Gumla district in South Chotanagpur Division
M: municipality, CT: census town, R: rural/ urban centre, H: historical/ religious centre, T: tourist centre, B: Bauxite mining centre
Owing to space constraints in the small map, the actual locations in a larger map may vary slightly

=== Location ===
Serangdag is located at 23.364048°N 84.453768°E

=== Area overview ===
The map alongside presents a rugged area, consisting partly of flat-topped hills called pat and partly of an undulating plateau, in the south-western portion of Chota Nagpur Plateau. Three major rivers – the Sankh, South Koel and North Karo - along with their numerous tributaries, drain the area. The hilly area has large deposits of Bauxite. 93.7% of the population lives in rural areas.

Note: The map alongside presents some of the notable locations in the district. All places marked in the map are linked in the larger full screen map.

== Demographics ==
According to the 2011 Census of India, Serangdag had a total population of 1,091, of which 562 (52%) were males and 526 (48%) were females. Population in the age range 0–6 years was 229. The total number of literate persons in Serangdag was 320 (37.12% of the population over 6 years).

(*For language details see Ghaghra block#Language and religion)

== Bauxite mining ==
"Jharkhand holds a very large potential of Bauxite amounting to a reserve of 117.54 MT (Source-IBM as on 1/4/2005)" - these deposits are found mainly in Lohardaga, Latehar and Gumla districts and the adjoining plateau region. Deep forest cover makes these areas inaccessible. Suitable communication channels are not there.

In 2016-17, Jharkhand produced 2,289,825,000 tonnes of Bauxite.

Bauxite and laterite (aluminium ore) is found in "villages of Amtipani, Langdatanr, Chirodih, Jalim, Narma, Bahagara and Gurdari of Bishunpur block, Langatanr, Lupungpat and Chota-agiatu in Chainpur block and Hanrup, Serengdag and Jalim in Ghaghra block. The total number of bauxite mines is twenty one".

In Gumla district the mines are operated manually/ semi-mechanised methods. After blasting, manual sorting and sizing of bauxite from the run of mine ore is practiced in the mine.

== Transport ==
Bauxite is ferried in trucks from the mines in Gumla and Lohardaga districts to the plants of Hindalco Industries in Muri and Renukoot. Hundreds of trucks carrying bauxite ply on the Netarhat-Bishunpur-Ghaghra-Lohardaga route. However, in 2009, when Maoists torched some vehicles in Ghaghra block, Hindalco mines at Serengdag and Gurdari in Gumla district and Bagru and Pakhari in Lohardaga district were affected.
