= Basia block =

Basia
- Community development block
- Coordinates: 22.8756°N 84.82433°E
- Country: India
- State: Jharkhand
- District: Gumla

Government
  - Type: Federal democracy

Area
  - Total: 398.99 km^{2} (154.05 sq mi)

Population (2011)
  - Total: 80,731
  - Density: 202.34/km^{2} (524.05/sq mi)

Languages
  - Official: Hindi, Nagpuri
- Time zone: UTC+5:30 (IST)
- PIN: 835229
- Telephone/STD code: 06533
- Vehicle registration: JH-07
- Literacy: 67.66%
- Lok Sabha constituency: Lohardaga
- Vidhan Sabha constituency: Sisai
- Website: gumla.nic.in

Basia block is a CD block that forms an administrative division in the Basia subdivision of Gumla district, in the Indian state of Jharkhand.

== History ==
Gumla became a subdivision of Ranchi district in 1902 and it became a separate district in 1983. Simdega district was carved out of Gumla district in 2011. Subsequently, Gumla district was divided into three subdivisions – Gumla Sadar subdivision (with Gumla, Ghaghra, Bharno, Bishunpur, Raidih and Sisia blocks), Basia subdivision (with Palkot, Basia and Kamdara blocks), and Chainpur subdivision (with Chainpur, Albert Ekka (Jari) and Dumri blocks).

== Maoist activities ==
The Maoist insurgency started spreading around the mid-1990s and poses a big challenge to peace and development of the district. It “is involved in abduction, extortion, extortion killings.” The banned organisation is active largely in the eastern part of the district mainly in Kamadara, Basia, Palkot, Gumla, Raidih, Sisai and Bharno police stations. In order to counter the activities of the insurgents, arms, ammunition and security equipment have been provided in every police station. It includes bullet-proof and landmine-proof vehicles.

== Geography ==
In the southern portion of Gumla district, there are flat topped hills called pat, with an elevation ranging from 2,500 feet to 3,000 feet. The pat region is spread across Bishunpur, Chainpur and Ghaghra CD blocks. The highest areas are Netarhat pat (3,356 ft), Lamiti pat (3,777 ft) and Galgat pat (3,823 ft). The rest of the district occupies a part of the Ranchi Plateau with an average elevation of 2,300 feet.

Three major rivers flowing through Gumla district are North Koel River, South Koel River and Sankh River.

Basia CD block is bounded by Sisai and Bharno CD blocks on the north, Kamdara CD block on the east, Kolebira CD block in Simdega district on the south, and Palkot CD block on the west.

Basia CD block has an area of 398.99 km^{2}.Basia police station serves Basia CD block. The headquarters of Basia CD block is located at Basia village.

== Demographics ==
=== Population ===
According to the 2011 Census of India, Basia CD block had a total population of 80,731, all of which were rural. There were 40,321 (50%) males and 40,410 (50%) females. Population in the age range 0–6 years was 12,694. Scheduled Castes numbered 4,402 (5.20%) and Scheduled Tribes numbered 51,634 (63.96%).

=== Literacy ===
According to the 2011 census, the total number of literate persons in Basia CD block was 46,031 (67.66% of the population over 6 years) out of which males numbered 26,156 (77.26% of the male population over 6 years) and females numbered 19,875 (58.14% of the female population over 6 years). The gender disparity (the difference between female and male literacy rates) was 19.12%.

As of 2011 census, literacy in Gumla district was 66.92%. Literacy in Jharkhand was 67.63% in 2011. Literacy in India in 2011 was 74.04%.

See also – List of Jharkhand districts ranked by literacy rate

Literacy in CD Blocks of
Gumla district
Gumla Sadar subdivision
Gumla – 72.28%
Ghaghra – 57.56%
Bharno – 58.24%
Bishunpur – 57.95%
Raidih – 68.98%
Sisai – 63.06%
Basia subdivision
Palkot – 61.55
Kamdara – 68.51%
Basia – 67.66%
Chainpur subdivision
Chainpur –71.22%
Dumri – 69.83%
Albert Ekka (Jari) –71.43%
Source: 2011 Census: CD block Wise
Primary Census Abstract Data

=== Language and religion ===
Religions in Basia block (2011)
Religion	Percent
Hinduism	40.49%
Christianity	31.15%
Sarna	25.84%
Islam	1.90%
Other or not stated	0.62%

According to the Population by Religious Communities 2011 data, in the Basia subdistrict, Hindus numbered 32,687 and formed 40.49% of the population, followed by (number of persons and percentage of population in brackets) Christians (25,148/ 31.15%), ‘Other religious communities’ (20,860/ 25.84%), Muslims (1,530/1.90%), and persons who did not state their religion (408/ 0.51%).

Scheduled Tribes numbered 706,754 and formed 68.94% of the total population of Gumla district. Within the scheduled tribes the more populous tribes were (percentage of ST population in 2011 in brackets): Oraon, Dhangars (62.63%), Munda, Patars (11.70%), Kharia, Dhelki Kharia, Dudh Kharia, Hill Kharia (9.07%), Lohras (5.77%) and Chik Baraik (2.57%).

Languages in Basia block (2011)
1. Sadri (71.5%)
2. Kharia (13.9%)
3. Mundari (8.04%)
4. Hindi (2.76%)
5. Kurukh (2.08%)
6. Odia (0.91%)
7. Others (0.82%)

According to the Population by Mother Tongue 2011 data, in the Basia subdistrict, Hindi was the mother-tongue of 60,482 persons forming 74.92% of the population, followed by (number of persons and percentage of population in brackets), Kharia (11,257/ 13.92%), Mundari (6,438/ 7.86%), Kurukh (1,677/ 2.08%), Odia (738/ 0.91%) and persons with other languages as mother-tongue (229/ 0.28%). Persons with Hindi as mother-tongue included 45,481 persons having Sadri/ Sadan, 12,141 persons having Nagpuri as mother-tongue.

Note: An attempt has been made to include all language groups each with at least 300 persons as their mother-tongue and only those groups with less than 300 persons as their mother-tongue in the census data are normally included in the “other languages” category. Comparatively smaller language groups with 200+ persons as their mother-tongue are mentioned in the text. Many languages have sub-groups. Those who are interested can see the reference for more details.

Hindi is the official language in Jharkhand and Urdu has been declared as an additional official language.

== Economy ==
=== Overview ===
80% and over of the population of Gumla district were in the BPL category in 2004–2005. In 2011-12, the proportion of BPL population in Gumla district came down to 36.75%. According to a study in 2013 (modified in 2019), "the incidence of poverty in Jharkhand is estimated at 46%, but 60% of the scheduled castes and scheduled tribes are still below poverty line."

=== Livelihood ===
Livelihood
in Basia CD block
1. Cultivators (59.3%)
2. Agricultural labourers (29.5%)
3. Household industries (2.84%)
4. Other Workers (8.37%)

In Basia CD block in 2011, amongst the class of total workers, cultivators numbered 24,276 and formed 59.33%, agricultural labourers numbered 12,052 and formed 29.46%, household industry workers numbered 1,163 and formed 2.84% and other workers numbered 3,425 and formed 8.37%. Total workers numbered 40,916 and formed 50.68% of the total population, and non-workers numbered 39,815 and formed 49.32% of the population.

=== Infrastructure ===
There are 88 inhabited villages in Basia CD block. In 2011, 17 villages had power supply. 3 villages had tap water (treated/ untreated), 88 villages had well water (covered/ uncovered), 88 villages had hand pumps, and all villages have drinking water facility. 8 villages had post offices, 7 villages had sub post offices, 6 villages had telephones (land lines), 40 villages had mobile phone coverage. 88 villages had pucca (paved) village roads, 30 villages had bus service (public/ private), 6 villages had autos/ modified autos, 7 villages had taxi/ vans, 21 villages had tractors. 6 villages had bank branches, 5 villages had agricultural credit societies, 44 villages had public distribution system, 1 village had assembly polling station.

=== Agriculture ===
In Gumla district, only three CD blocks, namely Sisai, Bharno and Kamdara, have plain lands. Rest of the district is mostly undulating in nature. Forests cover around 27% of the total area. About 35% of the total geographical area of the district is under cultivation. Out of 3.296 lakh hectare cultivable lands, only 22,056 hectare of land is under assured irrigation coverage. “The main economy of the village depends upon agriculture, forest produce, cattle development, and other labour activities...” About 70% farmers belong to the small and marginal category and have small plots scattered all around. Percentages of landless farmers are negligible.

=== Backward Regions Grant Fund ===
Gumla district is listed as a backward region and receives financial support from the Backward Regions Grant Fund. The fund, created by the Government of India, is designed to redress regional imbalances in development. As of 2012, 272 districts across the country were listed under this scheme. The list includes 21 districts of Jharkhand.

== Education ==
Basia CD block had 29 villages with pre-primary schools, 85 villages with primary schools, 38 villages with middle schools, 11 villages with secondary schools, 6 villages with senior secondary schools, 1 village with general degree college, 1 village had no educational facility.
.*Senior secondary schools are also known as Inter colleges in Jharkhand

== Healthcare ==
Basia CD block had 8 villages with primary health centres, 26 villages with primary health subcentres, 57 villages with maternity and child welfare centres, 5 villages with allopathic hospitals, 3 villages with dispensaries, 7 villages with family welfare centres,.
.*Private medical practitioners, alternative medicine etc. not included
