= Dumri, Gumla (village) =

Dumri
- Village
- Location in Jharkhand, India Dumri (India)
- Coordinates: 23.168889°N 84.136306°E
- Country: India
- State: Jharkhand
- District: Gumla

Government
  - Type: Federal democracy

Population (2011)
  - Total: 4,048

Languages *
  - Official: Hindi, Urdu
- Time zone: UTC+5:30 (IST)
- PIN: 835207
- Telephone/ STD code: 06524
- Vehicle registration: JH 07
- Literacy: 75.09%
- Lok Sabha constituency: Lohardaga
- Vidhan Sabha constituency: Gumla
- Website: gumla.nic.in

Dumri is a village in the Dumri CD block in the Chainpur subdivision of the Gumla district in the Indian state of Jharkhand.

== Geography ==
Cities, towns and locations in Gumla district in South Chotanagpur Division
M: municipality, CT: census town, R: rural/ urban centre, H: historical/ religious centre, T: tourist centre, B: Bauxite mining centre
Owing to space constraints in the small map, the actual locations in a larger map may vary slightly

=== Location ===
Dumri is located at 23.168889°N 84.136306°E

=== Area overview ===
The map alongside presents a rugged area, consisting partly of flat-topped hills called pat and partly of an undulating plateau, in the south-western portion of Chota Nagpur Plateau. Three major rivers – the Sankh, South Koel and North Karo - along with their numerous tributaries, drain the area. The hilly area has large deposits of Bauxite. 93.7% of the population lives in rural areas.

Note: The map alongside presents some of the notable locations in the district. All places marked in the map are linked in the larger full screen map.

== Civic administration ==
There is a police station at Dumri.

The headquarters of Dumri CD block are located at Dumri village.

== Demographics ==
According to the 2011 Census of India, Dumri had a total population of 4,048, of which 1,998 (49%) were males and 2,050 (51%) were females. Population in the age range 0–6 years was 624. The total number of literate persons in Dumri was 2,571 (75.09% of the population over 6 years).

(*For language details see Dumri, Gumla#Language and religion)

== Education ==
Dumri College is affiliated with Ranchi University. Established in 1990, it has facilities for teaching in classes XI and XII.

Government High School Dumri Tangardih is a Hindi-medium coeducational institution established in 1961. It has facilities for teaching from class VIII to class XII. The school has a playground and a library with 498 books.

Kasturba Gandhi Balika Vidyalaya is a Hindi-medium girls only institution established in 2007. It has facilities for teaching from class VI to class XII. The school has a playground, a library with 645 books and has 5 computers for learning and teaching purposes.

Project Girls High School is a Hindi-medium girls only institution established in 1982. It has facilities for teaching from class VIII to class X. It has a playground and a library with 529 books.
