= Bishunpur, Gumla =

Bishunpur
- Village
- Location in Jharkhand, India Bishunpur (India)
- Coordinates: 23.381484°N 84.371667°E
- Country: India
- State: Jharkhand
- District: Gumla

Government
  - Type: Federal democracy

Population (2011)
  - Total: 1,309

Languages *
  - Official: Hindi, Urdu
- Time zone: UTC+5:30 (IST)
- PIN: 835231
- Telephone/ STD code: 06524
- Vehicle registration: JH 07
- Literacy: 79.52%
- Lok Sabha constituency: Lohardaga
- Vidhan Sabha constituency: Bishunpur
- Website: gumla.nic.in

Bishunpur is a village in the Bishunpur CD block in the Gumla subdivision of the Gumla district in the Indian state of Jharkhand.

== Geography ==
Cities, towns and locations in Gumla district in South Chotanagpur Division
M: municipality, CT: census town, R: rural/ urban centre, H: historical/ religious centre, T: tourist centre, B: Bauxite mining centre
Owing to space constraints in the small map, the actual locations in a larger map may vary slightly

=== Location ===
Bishunpur is located at 23.381484°N 84.371667°E

Bishunpur is 51 km west of Lohardaga on the Ranchi- Netarhat road.

=== Area overview ===
The map alongside presents a rugged area, consisting partly of flat-topped hills called pat and partly of an undulating plateau, in the south-western portion of Chota Nagpur Plateau. Three major rivers – the Sankh, South Koel and North Karo - along with their numerous tributaries, drain the area. The hilly area has large deposits of Bauxite. 93.7% of the population lives in rural areas.

Note: The map alongside presents some of the notable locations in the district. All places marked in the map are linked in the larger full screen map.

== Civic administration ==
There is a police station at Bishunpur.

The headquarters of Bishunpur CD block are located at Bishunpur village.

== Demographics ==
According to the 2011 Census of India, Bishunpur had a total population of 1,309, of which 652 (50%) were males and 657 (50%) were females. Population in the age range 0–6 years was 181. The total number of literate persons in Bishunpur was 897 (79.52% of the population over 6 years).

(*For language details see Bishunpur block#Language and religion)

== Education ==
S.S. High School Bishunpur is a Hindi-medium coeducational institution established in 1957. It has facilities for teaching from class VII to class XII. It has a playground and a library with 500 books.

Kasturba Gandhi Balika Vidyalaya is a Hindi-medium girls only institution established in 2007. It has facilities for teaching from class VI to class XII. The school has a playground, a library with 328 books and has 9 computers for learning and teaching purposes.

Project Girls High School is a Hindi-medium girls only institution established in 1981. It has facilities for teaching in classes IX and X. The school has a library with 252 books.
