= Kamdara =

- Village
- Location in Jharkhand, India Kamdara (India)
- Coordinates: 22.9126°N 84.9163°E
- Country: India
- State: Jharkhand
- District: Gumla

Government
  - Type: Federal democracy

Population (2011)
  - Total: 3,742

Languages *
  - Official: Hindi, Urdu
- Time zone: UTC+5:30 (IST)
- PIN: 835227
- Telephone/ STD code: 06533
- Vehicle registration: JH 07
- Literacy: 81.25%
- Lok Sabha constituency: Lohardaga
- Vidhan Sabha constituency: Sisai
- Website: gumla.nic.in

Kamdara is a village in the Kamdara CD block in the Basia subdivision of the Gumla district in the Indian state of Jharkhand.

== Geography ==
Cities, towns and locations in Gumla district in South Chotanagpur Division
M: municipality, CT: census town, R: rural/ urban centre, H: historical/ religious centre, T: tourist centre, B: Bauxite mining centre
Owing to space constraints in the small map, the actual locations in a larger map may vary slightly

=== Location ===
Kamdara is located at 22.9126°N 84.9163°E

=== Area overview ===
The map alongside presents a rugged area, consisting partly of flat-topped hills called pat and partly of an undulating plateau, in the south-western portion of Chota Nagpur Plateau. Three major rivers – the Sankh, South Koel and North Karo - along with their numerous tributaries, drain the area. The hilly area has large deposits of Bauxite. 93.7% of the population lives in rural areas.

Note: The map alongside presents some of the notable locations in the district. All places marked in the map are linked in the larger full screen map.

== Civic administration ==
There is a police station at Kamdara.

The headquarters of Kamdara CD block are located at Kamdara village.

== Demographics ==
According to the 2011 Census of India, Kamdara had a total population of 3,742, of which 1,771 (47%) were males and 1,971 (53%) were females. Population in the age range 0–6 years was 520. The total number of literate persons in Kamdara was 2,618 (81.25% of the population over 6 years).

(*For language details see Kamdara block#Language and religion)

== Education ==
Glossop Memorial High School Kamdara is a Hindi-medium coeducational institution established in 1952.t has facilities for teaching from class VI to class X. The school has a playground, a library with 200 books and has 2 computers for teaching and learning purposes.

Kasturba Gandhi Balika Vidyalaya is a Hindi-medium girls only institution established in 2007. It has facilities for teaching from class VI to class XII. The school has a playground, a library with 721 books and has 5 computers for learning and teaching purposes.

Project Girls High School is a Hindi-medium girls only institution established in 1983.It has facilities for teaching from class VI to class X. The school has a library with 59 books.
