= Toto, Gumla =

Toto
- Census Town
- Location in Jharkhand, India Toto (India)
- Coordinates: 23.145464°N 84.503667°E
- Country: India
- State: Jharkhand
- District: Gumla

Government
  - Type: Federal democracy

Area
  - Total: 2.9029 km^{2} (1.1208 sq mi)

Population (2011)
  - Total: 5,237
  - Density: 1,804/km^{2} (4,672/sq mi)

Languages *
  - Official: Hindi, Urdu
- Time zone: UTC+5:30 (IST)
- PIN: 835297
- Telephone/ STD code: 06524
- Vehicle registration: JH 07
- Literacy: 80.27%
- Lok Sabha constituency: Lohardaga
- Vidhan Sabha constituency: Gumla
- Website: gumla.nic.in

Toto is a census town in the Gumla CD block in the Gumla subdivision of the Gumla district in the Indian state of Jharkhand.

== Geography ==
Cities, towns and locations in Gumla district in South Chotanagpur Division
M: municipality, CT: census town, R: rural/ urban centre, H: historical/ religious centre, T: tourist centre, B: Bauxite mining centre
Owing to space constraints in the small map, the actual locations in a larger map may vary slightly

=== Location ===
Toto is located at 22.145464°N 84.503667°E

=== Area overview ===
The map alongside presents a rugged area, consisting partly of flat-topped hills called pat and partly of an undulating plateau, in the south-western portion of Chota Nagpur Plateau. Three major rivers – the Sankh, South Koel and North Karo - along with their numerous tributaries, drain the area. The hilly area has large deposits of Bauxite. 93.7% of the population lives in rural areas.

Note: The map alongside presents some of the notable locations in the district. All places marked in the map are linked in the larger full screen map.

== Infrastructure ==
According to the District Census Handbook 2011, Gumla, Toto covered an area of 2.9029 km^{2} (1.1208 sq mi). Among the civic amenities, it had five km (3.1 mi) of roads with both closed and open drains, the protected water supply involved uncovered well, hand pump. It had 564 domestic electric connections. Among the medical facilities, it had 10 hospitals, 9 dispensaries, 9 health centres, 1 family welfare centre, 1 maternity and child welfare centre, 1 maternity homes, 1 veterinary hospital, 3 medicine shops. Among the educational facilities it had 5 primary schools, 2 middle schools, 2 secondary schools, other educational facilities at Gumla, ten km (6.2 mi) away It had 1 non-formal education centre (Sarva Shiksha Abhiyan). An important commodity it produced was timber. It had the branch offices of 1 nationalised bank, 1 cooperative bank.

== Demographics ==
According to the 2011 Census of India, Toto had a total population of 5,237, of which 2,709 (52%) were males and 2,528 (48%) were females. Population in the age range 0-6 years was 797. The total number of literate persons in Toto was 3,564 (80.27% of the population over 6 years).

(*For language details see Gumla block#Language and religion)

== Education ==
Sishu Mandir Toto is a Hindi-medium coeducational institution established in 1989. It has facilities for teaching from class I to class X. The school has a library with 100 books.

Government High School Toto is a Hindi-medium coeducational institution established in 1964. It has facilities for teaching in classes IX and X. The school has a playground and a library with 380 books.
