= Basia subdivision =

- Subdivision
- Location in Jharkhand, India Basia subdivision (India)
- Coordinates: 22.8756°N 84.8243°E
- Country: India
- State: Jharkhand
- District: Gumla
- Headquarters: Basia

Area
  - Total: 1,343.43 km^{2} (518.70 sq mi)

Population (2011)
  - Total: 225,365
  - Density: 167.753/km^{2} (434.479/sq mi)

Languages
  - Official: Hindi, Nagpuri, Urdu
- Time zone: UTC+5:30 (IST)
- Website: gumla.nic.in

Basia subdivision is an administrative subdivision of the Gumla district in the South Chotanagpur division in the state of Jharkhand, India.

== History ==
As of 2022, Gumla district is divided into three subdivisions – Gumla subdivision (with Gumla, Ghaghra, Bharno, Bishunpur, Raidih and Sisai blocks), Basia subdivision (with Palkot, Basia and Kamdara blocks), and Chainpur subdivision (with Chainpur, Albert Ekka (Jari) and Dumri blocks).

== Overview ==
The subdivisions of Gumla district have the following distinctions:

Subdivision	Headquarters	Area km^{2}	Population (2011)	Rural population % (2011)	Urban population % (2011)
Gumla	Gumla	2,930.76	663,197	90.19	9.81
Chainpur	Chainpur	1,053.50	136,651	100	0
Basia	Basia	1,343.43	225,365	100	0

Note: Calculated on the basis of block-wise data available.

Cities, towns and locations in Gumla district in South Chotanagpur Division
M: municipality, CT: census town, R: rural/ urban centre, H: historical/ religious centre, T: tourist centre, B: Bauxite mining centre
Owing to space constraints in the small map, the actual locations in a larger map may vary slightly

== Police stations ==
Police stations in the Basia subdivision are at:

1. Basia
2. Kamdara
3. Palkot

== Blocks ==
Community development blocks in the Basia subdivision are:

CD Block	Headquarters	Area km^{2}	Population (2011)	SC %	ST %	Literacy rate %	CT
Basia	Basia	398.99	80,731	5.20	63.96	67.66	-
Kamdara	Kamdara	365.41	63,775	3.52	70.61	68.51	-
Palkot	Palkot	579.03	80,859	8.08	60.11	61.55	-

== Education ==
In 2011, in the Basia subdivision out of a total 234 inhabited villages in 3 CD blocks there were 53 villages with pre-primary schools, 223 villages with primary schools, 101 villages with middle schools, 23 villages with secondary schools, 14 villages with senior secondary schools, 1 village with general degree college, 9 villages with no educational facility.
.*Senior secondary schools are also known as Inter colleges in Jharkhand.

=== Educational institutions ===
(Information about degree colleges with proper reference may be added here)

== Healthcare ==
In 2011, in the Basia subdivision, in the 3 CD blocks, there were 17 villages with primary health centres, 67 villages with primary health subcentres, 87 villages with maternity and child welfare centres, 10 villages with allopathic hospitals, 9 villages with dispensaries, 2 villages with a veterinary hospitals, 16 villages with family welfare centres, 3 villages with medicine shops.
.*Private medical practitioners, alternative medicine etc. not included

=== Medical facilities ===
(Anybody having referenced information about location of government/ private medical facilities may please add it here)
