= Chainpur subdivision =

- Subdivision
- Location in Jharkhand, India Chainpur subdivision (India)
- Coordinates: 23.1356°N 84.2393°E
- Country: India
- State: Jharkhand
- District: Gumla
- Headquarters: Chainpur

Area
  - Total: 1,053.50 km^{2} (406.76 sq mi)

Population
  - Total: 136,651
  - Density: 129.711/km^{2} (335.951/sq mi)

Languages
  - Official: Hindi, Urdu
- Time zone: UTC+5:30 (IST)
- Website: gumla.nic.in

Chainpur subdivision is an administrative subdivision of the Gumla district in the South Chotanagpur division in the state of Jharkhand, India.

== History ==
As of 2022, Gumla district is divided into three subdivisions – Gumla subdivision (with Gumla, Ghaghra, Bharno, Bishunpur, Raidih and Sisai blocks), Basia subdivision (with Palkot, Basia and Kamdara blocks), and Chainpur subdivision (with Chainpur, Albert Ekka (Jari) and Dumri blocks).

== Overview ==
The subdivisions of Gumla district have the following distinctions:

Subdivision	Headquarters	Area km^{2}	Population (2011)	Rural population % (2011)	Urban population % (2011)
Gumla	Gumla	2,930.76	663,197	90.19	9.81
Chainpur	Chainpur	1,053.50	136,651	100	0
Basia	Basia	1,343.43	225,365	100	0

Note: Calculated on the basis of block-wise data available.

Cities, towns and locations in Gumla district in South Chotanagpur Division
M: municipality, CT: census town, R: rural/ urban centre, H: historical/ religious centre, T: tourist centre, B: Bauxite mining centre
Owing to space constraints in the small map, the actual locations in a larger map may vary slightly

== Police stations ==
Police stations in the Chainpur subdivision are at:

1. Chainpur
2. Dumri
3. Jari

== Blocks ==
Community development blocks in the Chainpur subdivision are:

CD Block	Headquarters	Area km^{2}	Population (2011)	SC %	ST %	Literacy rate %	CT
Chainpur	Chainpur	471.41	56,591	1.37	81.55	71.22	-
Dumri	Dumri	373.27	49,134	2.11	82.20	69.83	-
Albert Ekka (Jari)	Jari	208.72	30,926	3.69	76.74	71.43	-

== Education ==
In 2011, in the Chainpur subdivision out of a total 197 inhabited villages in 3 CD blocks there were 62 villages with pre-primary schools, 177 villages with primary schools, 75 villages with middle schools, 15 villages with secondary schools, 3 villages with senior secondary schools, 2 villages with general degree colleges, 18 villages with no educational facility.
.*Senior secondary schools are also known as Inter colleges in Jharkhand.

=== Educational institutions ===
The following institution is located in Chainpur subdivision:

- Paramvir Albert Ekka Memorial College was established at Chainpur in 1975. It also has facilities for teaching in classes XI and XII.

(Information about degree colleges with proper reference may be added here)

== Healthcare ==
In 2011, in the Chainpur subdivision, in the 3 CD blocks, there were 8 villages with primary health centres, 30 villages with primary health subcentres, 9 villages with maternity and child welfare centres, 10 villages with allopathic hospitals, 6 villages with dispensaries, 1 village with a veterinary hospital, 8 villages with family welfare centres, 10 villages with medicine shops.
.*Private medical practitioners, alternative medicine etc. not included

=== Medical facilities ===
(Anybody having referenced information about location of government/ private medical facilities may please add it here)
