= Bharno =

- Village
- Location in Jharkhand, India Bharno (India)
- Coordinates: 23.235224°N 84.890267°E
- Country: India
- State: Jharkhand
- District: Gumla

Government
  - Type: Federal democracy

Population (2011)
  - Total: 8,680

Languages *
  - Official: Hindi, Urdu
- Time zone: UTC+5:30 (IST)
- PIN: 835203
- Telephone/ STD code: 06529
- Vehicle registration: JH 07
- Literacy: 72.07%
- Lok Sabha constituency: Lohardaga
- Vidhan Sabha constituency: Sisai
- Website: gumla.nic.in

Bharno (also spelled as Bherno) is a village in the Bharno CD block in the Gumla subdivision of the Gumla district in the Indian state of Jharkhand.

== Geography ==
Cities, towns and locations in Gumla district in South Chotanagpur Division
M: municipality, CT: census town, R: rural/ urban centre, H: historical/ religious centre, T: tourist centre, B: Bauxite mining centre
Owing to space constraints in the small map, the actual locations in a larger map may vary slightly

=== Location ===
Bharno is located at 23.235224°N 84.890267°E

=== Area overview ===
The map alongside presents a rugged area, consisting partly of flat-topped hills called pat and partly of an undulating plateau, in the south-western portion of Chota Nagpur Plateau. Three major rivers – the Sankh, South Koel and North Karo - along with their numerous tributaries, drain the area. The hilly area has large deposits of Bauxite. 93.7% of the population lives in rural areas.

Note: The map alongside presents some of the notable locations in the district. All places marked in the map are linked in the larger full screen map.

== Civic administration ==
There is a police station at Bharno.

The headquarters of Bharno CD block are located at Bharno village.

== Demographics ==
According to the 2011 Census of India, Bharno had a total population of 8,680, of which 4,230 (49%) were males and 4,450 (51%) were females. Population in the age range 0–6 years was 1,261. The total number of literate persons in Bharno was 5,347 (72.07% of the population over 6 years).

(*For language details see Bharno block#Language and religion)

== Education ==
Government High School Bharno is a Hindi-medium coeducational institution established in 1950. It has facilities for teaching from class VIII to class XII. The school has a playground and a library with 2,500 books.

Lalit Oraon Smarak High School Bharno is a Hindi-medium coeducational institution established in 2014. It has facilities for teaching from class I to class X.

Adivasi Public School Bharno is a Hindi-medium coeducational institution established in 2014. It has facilities for teaching from class I to class X.
