= Gumla block =

Gumla
- Community development block
- Coordinates: 23.044444°N 84.541667°E
- Country: India
- State: Jharkhand
- District: Gumla

Government
  - Type: Federal democracy

Area
  - Total: 528.77 km^{2} (204.16 sq mi)

Population (2011)
  - Total: 213,620
  - Density: 403.99/km^{2} (1,046.3/sq mi)

Languages
  - Official: Hindi, Urdu
- Time zone: UTC+5:30 (IST)
- PIN: 835297
- Telephone/STD code: 06524
- Vehicle registration: JH 07
- Literacy: 72.28%
- Lok Sabha constituency: Lohardaga
- Vidhan Sabha constituency: Gumla
- Website: gumla.nic.in

Gumla block is a CD block that forms an administrative division in the Gumla subdivision of Gumla district, in the Indian state of Jharkhand.

== History ==
Gumla became a subdivision of Ranchi district in 1902 and it became a separate district in 1983. Simdega district was carved out of Gumla district in 2011. Subsequently, Gumla district was divided into three subdivisions – Gumla Sadar subdivision (with Gumla, Ghaghra, Bharno, Bishunpur, Raidih and Sisai blocks), Basia subdivision (with Palkot, Basia and Kamdara blocks), and Chainpur subdivision (with Chainpur, Albert Ekka (Jari) and Dumri blocks).

== Maoist activities ==
The Maoist insurgency started spreading around the mid-1990s and poses a big challenge to peace and development of the district. It “is involved in abduction, extortion, extortion killings.” The banned organisation is active largely in the eastern part of the district mainly in Kamadara, Basia, Palkot, Gumla, Raidih, Sisai and Bharno police stations. In order to counter the activities of the insurgents, arms, ammunition and security equipment have been provided in every police station. It includes bullet-proof and landmine-proof vehicles.

== Geography ==
In the southern portion of Gumla district, there are flat topped hills called pat, with an elevation ranging from 2,500 feet to 3,000 feet. The pat region is spread across Bishunpur, Chainpur and Ghaghra CD blocks. The highest areas are Netarhat pat (3,356 ft), Lamiti pat (3,777 ft) and Galgat pat (3,823 ft). The rest of the district occupies a part of the Ranchi Plateau with an average elevation of 2,300 feet.

Three major rivers flowing through Gumla district are North Koel River, South Koel River and Sankh River.

Gumla CD block is bounded by Ghaghra and Sisai CD blocks on the north, Basia CD block on the east, Palkot and Raidih CD blocks on the south, and Chainpur CD block on the west.

Gumla CD block has an area of 528.77 km^{2}.Gumla police station serves Gumla CD block. The headquarters of Gumla CD block is located at Gumla town.

== Demographics ==
=== Population ===
According to the 2011 Census of India, Gumla CD block had a total population of 213,620, of which 157,119 were rural and 56,501 were urban. There were 107,917 (51%) males and 105,703 (49%) females. Population in the age range 0–6 years was 34,928. Scheduled Castes numbered 8,741 (4.1%) and Scheduled Tribes numbered 122,290 (57.2%).

The only census town in Gumla CD block is (2011 population figure in brackets): Gumla (51,264) and Toto (5,237).

=== Literacy ===
According to the 2011 census, the total number of literate persons in Gumla CD block was 129,160 (72.28% of the population over 6 years) out of which males numbered 72,765 (80.83% of the male population over 6 years) and females numbered 56,395 (63.6% of the female population over 6 years). The gender disparity (the difference between female and male literacy rates) was 17.23%.

As of 2011 census, literacy in Gumla district was 66.92%. Literacy in Jharkhand was 67.63% in 2011. Literacy in India in 2011 was 74.04%.

See also – List of Jharkhand districts ranked by literacy rate

Literacy in CD Blocks of
Gumla district
Gumla Sadar subdivision
Gumla – 72.28%
Ghaghra – 57.56%
Bharno – 58.24%
Bishunpur – 57.95%
Raidih – 68.98%
Sisai – 63.06%
Basia subdivision
Palkot – 61.55
Kamdara – 68.51%
Basia – 67.66%
Chainpur subdivision
Chainpur –71.22%
Dumri – 69.83%
Albert Ekka (Jari) –71.43%
Source: 2011 Census: CD block Wise
Primary Census Abstract Data

=== Language and religion ===
Religions in Gumla block (2011)
Religion	Percent
Sarna	44.25%
Hinduism	35.86%
Islam	9.91%
Christianity	9.70%
Other or not stated	0.28%

According to the Population by Religious Communities 2011 data, in the Gumla subdistrict, ‘Other religious communities’ numbered 94,517 and formed 44.25% of the population, followed by: (number of persons and percentage of population in brackets) Hindus (76,594/35.86%), Muslims (21,173/ 9.91%), Christians (20,722/ 9.70), and persons who did not state their religion (366/ 0.17%).

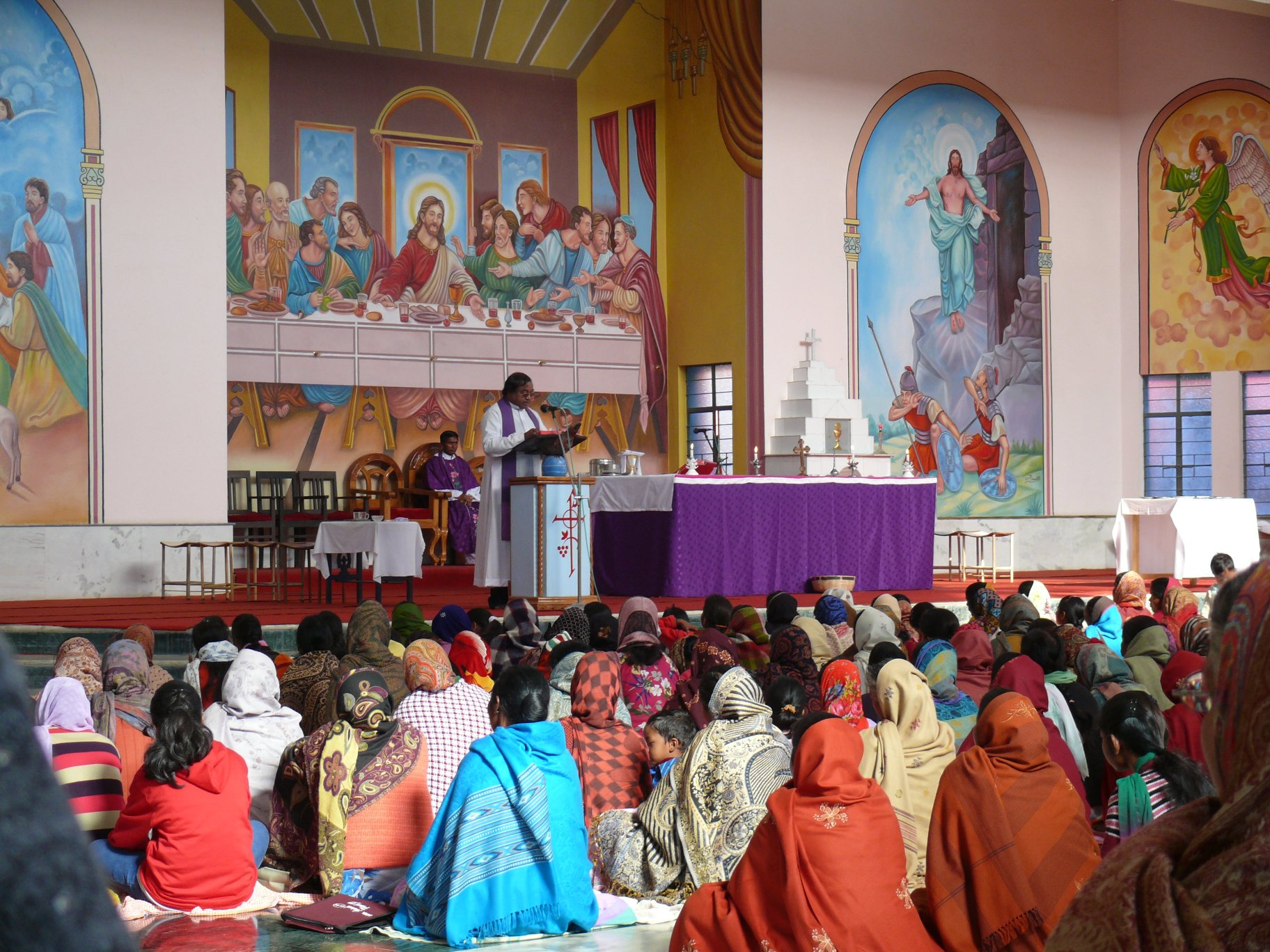
Inside St.Patrick's Cathedral, Gumla

Scheduled Tribes numbered 706,754 and formed 68.94% of the total population of Gumla district. Within the scheduled tribes the more populous tribes were (percentage of ST population in 2011 in brackets): Oraon, Dhangars (62.63%), Munda (11.70%), Kharia, Dhelki Kharia, Dudh Kharia, Hill Kharia (9.07%), Lohras (5.77%) and Chik Baraik (2.57%).

Languages in Gumla block (2011)
1. Sadri (41.2%)
2. Kurukh (30.1%)
3. Hindi (17.6%)
4. Urdu (6.06%)
5. Kharia (3.01%)
6. Other (2.05%)

Hindi is the official language in Jharkhand and Urdu has been declared as an additional official language.

According to the Population by Mother Tongue 2011 data, in the Gumla subdistrict, Hindi was the mother-tongue of 127,704 persons forming 59.80% of the population, followed by (number of persons and percentage of population in brackets), Kurukh (64,166/ 30.05%), Urdu (12,935/ 6.06%), Kharia (6,429/ 3.01%), Mundari (894/ .742%), Odia (367/ 0.17%), Bengali (366/ 0.17%), Maithili (317/ 0.15%) and persons with other languages as mother-tongue (368/ 0.17%). Persons with Hindi as mother-tongue included 33,528 persons having Sadri/ Sadan, 54,535 persons having Nagpuri, 634 persons having Magahi/ Magadhi, 759 persons having Bhojpuri, 225 persons having Chhattisgarhi as mother-tongue.

== Economy ==
=== Overview ===
80% and over of the population of Gumla district were in the BPL category in 2004–2005. In 2011–12, the proportion of BPL population in Gumla district came down to 36.75%. According to a study in 2013 (modified in 2019), "the incidence of poverty in Jharkhand is estimated at 46%, but 60% of the scheduled castes and scheduled tribes are still below poverty line."

=== Livelihood ===
Livelihood
in Gumla CD block
1. Cultivators (52.4%)
2. Agricultural labourers (18.3%)
3. Household industries (3.22%)
4. Other Workers (26.1%)

In Gumla CD block in 2011, amongst the class of total workers, cultivators numbered 44,133 and formed 52.40%, agricultural labourers numbered 15,440 and formed 18.33%, household industry workers numbered 2,715 and formed 3.22% and other workers numbered 21,943 and formed 26.05%. Total workers numbered 84,231 and formed 60.57% of the total population, and non-workers numbered 129,389 and formed 49.32% of the population.

=== Infrastructure ===
There are 107 inhabited villages in Gumla CD block. In 2011, 43 villages had power supply. 5 villages had tap water (treated/ untreated), 107 villages had well water (covered/ uncovered), 107 villages had hand pumps, and all villages have drinking water facility. 12 villages had post offices, 19 villages had sub post offices, 9 villages had telephones (land lines), 71 villages had mobile phone coverage. 107 villages had pucca (paved) village roads, 38 villages had bus service (public/ private), 39 villages had autos/ modified autos, 13 villages had taxi/ vans, 32 villages had tractors. 5 villages had bank branches, 3 villages had agricultural credit societies, 52 villages had public distribution system.

=== Agriculture ===
In Gumla district, only three CD blocks, namely Sisai, Bharno and Kamdara, have plain lands. Rest of the district is mostly undulating in nature. Forests cover around 27% of the total area. About 35% of the total geographical area of the district is under cultivation. Out of 3.296 lakh hectare cultivable lands, only 22,056 hectare of land is under assured irrigation coverage. “The main economy of the village depends upon agriculture, forest produce, cattle development, and other labour activities...” About 70% farmers belong to the small and marginal category and have small plots scattered all around. Percentages of landless farmers are negligible.

=== Backward Regions Grant Fund ===
Gumla district is listed as a backward region and receives financial support from the Backward Regions Grant Fund. The fund, created by the Government of India, is designed to redress regional imbalances in development. As of 2012, 272 districts across the country were listed under this scheme. The list includes 21 districts of Jharkhand.

== Education ==
Gumla CD block had 29 villages with pre-primary schools, 101 villages with primary schools, 58 villages with middle schools, 15 villages with secondary schools, 1 village with senior secondary school, 6 villages had no educational facility.
.*Senior secondary schools are also known as Inter colleges in Jharkhand

== Healthcare ==
Gumla CD block had 5 villages with primary health centres, 31 villages with primary health subcentres, 5 villages with maternity and child welfare centres, 3 villages with dispensaries, 2 villages with veterinary hospitals, 2 villages with family welfare centres, 1 village with medicine shop.
.*Private medical practitioners, alternative medicine etc. not included
