= Gurdari =

- Village
- Location in Jharkhand, India Gurdari (India)
- Coordinates: 23.334048°N 84.252568°E
- Country: India
- State: Jharkhand
- District: Gumla

Government
  - Type: Federal democracy

Population (2011)
  - Total: 3,432

Languages *
  - Official: Hindi, Urdu
- Time zone: UTC+5:30 (IST)
- PIN: 835220
- Telephone/ STD code: 06524
- Vehicle registration: JH 07
- Literacy: 70.14%
- Lok Sabha constituency: Lohardaga
- Vidhan Sabha constituency: Bishunpur
- Website: gumla.nic.in

Gurdari is a village/ Bauxite mining centre in the Bishunpur CD block in the Gumla subdivision of the Gumla district in the Indian state of Jharkhand.

== Geography ==
Cities, towns and locations in Gumla district in South Chotanagpur Division
M: municipality, CT: census town, R: rural/ urban centre, H: historical/ religious centre, T: tourist centre, B: Bauxite mining centre
Owing to space constraints in the small map, the actual locations in a larger map may vary slightly

=== Location ===
Gurdari is located at 23.334048°N 84.252568°E

=== Area overview ===
The map alongside presents a rugged area, consisting partly of flat-topped hills called pat and partly of an undulating plateau, in the south-western portion of Chota Nagpur Plateau. Three major rivers – the Sankh, South Koel and North Karo - along with their numerous tributaries, drain the area. The hilly area has large deposits of Bauxite. 93.7% of the population lives in rural areas.

Note: The map alongside presents some of the notable locations in the district. All places marked in the map are linked in the larger full screen map.

== Civic administration ==
There is a police station at Gurdari.

== Demographics ==
According to the 2011 Census of India, Gurdari had a total population of 3,432, of which 1,864 (54%) were males and 1,568 (46%) were females. Population in the age range 0–6 years was 622. The total number of literate persons in Gurdari was 1,971 (70.14% of the population over 6 years).

(*For language details see Bishunpur block#Language and religion)

== Bauxite mining ==
Bauxite and laterite (aluminium ore) is found in "villages of Amtipani, Langdatanr, Chirodih, Jalim, Narma, Bahagara and Gurdari of Bishunpur block, Langatanr, Lupungpat and Chota-agiatu in Chainpur block and Hanrup, Serengdag and Jalim in Ghaghra block. The total number of bauxite mines is twenty one".

In Gumla district the mines are operated manually/ semi-mechanised methods. After blasting, manual sorting and sizing of bauxite from the run of mine ore is practiced in the mine.

Gurdari Bauxite Mining Project, covering 584.19 ha, is operated by Hindalco Industries.
