= Chainpur, Gumla =

Chainpur
- Village
- Location in Jharkhand, India Chainpur (India)
- Coordinates: 23.1356°N 84.2393°E
- Country: India
- State: Jharkhand
- District: Gumla

Government
  - Type: Federal democracy

Population (2011)
  - Total: 6,507

Languages *
  - Official: Hindi, Urdu
- Time zone: UTC+5:30 (IST)
- PIN: 835206
- Telephone/ STD code: 06524
- Vehicle registration: JH 07
- Literacy: 88.32%
- Lok Sabha constituency: Lohardaga
- Vidhan Sabha constituency: Gumla
- Website: gumla.nic.in

Chainpur is a village in the Chainpur CD block in the Chainpur subdivision of the Gumla district in the Indian state of Jharkhand.

== Geography ==
Cities, towns and locations in Gumla district in South Chotanagpur Division
M: municipality, CT: census town, R: rural/ urban centre, H: historical/ religious centre, T: tourist centre, B: Bauxite mining centre
Owing to space constraints in the small map, the actual locations in a larger map may vary slightly

=== Location ===
Chainpur is located at 23.1356°N 84.2393°E

=== Area overview ===
The map alongside presents a rugged area, consisting partly of flat-topped hills called pat and partly of an undulating plateau, in the south-western portion of Chota Nagpur Plateau. Three major rivers – the Sankh, South Koel and North Karo - along with their numerous tributaries, drain the area. The hilly area has large deposits of Bauxite. 93.7% of the population lives in rural areas.

Note: The map alongside presents some of the notable locations in the district. All places marked in the map are linked in the larger full screen map.

== Civic administration ==
There is a police station at Chainpur.

The headquarters of Chainpur CD block are located at Chainpur village.

== Demographics ==
According to the 2011 Census of India, Chainpur had a total population of 6,507, of which 3,300 (51%) were males and 3,207 (49%) were females. Population in the age range 0–6 years was 830. The total number of literate persons in Chainpur was 5,014 (88.32% of the population over 6 years).

(*For language details see Chainpur block, Gumla#Language and religion)

== Education ==
Paramvir Albert Ekka Memorial College was established at Chainpur in 1975. Affiliated with Ranchi University, it offers honours courses in Hindi, Sanskrit, political science, history, economics, geography and a general course in arts. It also has facilities for teaching in classes XI and XII.

Lutheran High School Chainpur is a Hindi-medium coeducational institution established in 1947. It has facilities for teaching from class VI to class X. The school has a playground, a library with 2,595 books and has 2 computers for teaching and learning purposes.

St. Anna Girls High School Chainpur is a Hindi-medium girls only institution established in 1958. It has facilities for teaching from class VI to class X. The school has a playground, a library with 500 books and has 10 computers for teaching and learning purposes.

St. Xavier's School Chainpur is an English-medium coeducational institution established in 1996. It has facilities for teaching from class I to class X. The school has a library with 450 books and has 2 computers for teaching and learning purposes.

Project High School Chainpur is a Hindi-medium coeducational school established in 1982. It has facilities for teaching from class VIII to class XII. The school has a playground and a library with 529 books.
