= Basia, Gumla =

Basia
- Village
- Location in Jharkhand, India Basia (India)
- Coordinates: 22.8756°N 84.8243°E
- Country: India
- State: Jharkhand
- District: Gumla

Government
  - Type: Federal democracy

Population (2011)
  - Total: 3,985

Languages *
  - Official: Hindi, Urdu
- Time zone: UTC+5:30 (IST)
- PIN: 835229
- Telephone/ STD code: 06533
- Vehicle registration: JH 07
- Literacy: 74.84%
- Lok Sabha constituency: Lohardaga
- Vidhan Sabha constituency: Sisai
- Website: gumla.nic.in

Basia is a village in the Basia CD block in the Basia subdivision of the Gumla district in the Indian state of Jharkhand.

== Geography ==
Cities, towns and locations in Gumla district in South Chotanagpur Division
M: municipality, CT: census town, R: rural/ urban centre, H: historical/ religious centre, T: tourist centre, B: Bauxite mining centre
Owing to space constraints in the small map, the actual locations in a larger map may vary slightly

=== Location ===
Basia is located at 22.8756°N 84.8243°E

Basia is situated about 24 km. north of Kolebira in Simdega district.

=== Area overview ===
The map alongside presents a rugged area, consisting partly of flat-topped hills called pat and partly of an undulating plateau, in the south-western portion of Chota Nagpur Plateau. Three major rivers – the Sankh, South Koel and North Karo - along with their numerous tributaries, drain the area. The hilly area has large deposits of Bauxite. 93.7% of the population lives in rural areas.

Note: The map alongside presents some of the notable locations in the district. All places marked in the map are linked in the larger full screen map.

== Civic administration ==
There is a police station at Basia.

The headquarters of Basia CD block are located at Basia village.

== Demographics ==
According to the 2011 Census of India, Basia had a total population of 3,985, of which 1,979 (50%) were males and 2,006 (50%) were females. Population in the age range 0–6 years was 579. The total number of literate persons in Basia was 2,549 (74.84% of the population over 6 years).

(*For language details see Basia block#Language and religion)

== Education ==
Rajkriyakrit High School Basia is a Hindi-medium coeducational institution established in 1952. It has facilities for teaching from class VIII to class XII. The school has a playground and a library with 880 books.

Basia Inter College is a Hindi-medium coeducational institution established in 1985. It has facilities for teaching in classes XI and XII. It has a playground, a library with 400 books and has 3 computers for teaching and learning purposes.

Kasturba Gandhi Balika Vidyalaya is a Hindi-medium girls only institution established in 2007. It has facilities for teaching from class VI to class XII. The school has a playground, a library with 610 books and has 5 computers for learning and teaching purposes.
