= Nagfeni =

- Village
- Location in Jharkhand, India Nagfeni (India)
- Coordinates: 23.125324°N 84.681267°E
- Country: India
- State: Jharkhand
- District: Gumla

Government
  - Type: Federal democracy

Population (2011)
  - Total: 1,700

Languages *
  - Official: Hindi, Urdu
- Time zone: UTC+5:30 (IST)
- PIN: 835224
- Telephone/ STD code: 06523
- Vehicle registration: JH 07
- Literacy: 75.07%
- Lok Sabha constituency: Lohardaga
- Vidhan Sabha constituency: Sisai
- Website: gumla.nic.in

Nagfeni is a village in the Sisai CD block in the Gumla subdivision of the Gumla district in the Indian state of Jharkhand.

== Geography ==
Cities, towns and locations in Gumla district in South Chotanagpur Division
M: municipality, CT: census town, R: rural/ urban centre, H: historical/ religious centre, T: tourist centre, B: Bauxite mining centre
Owing to space constraints in the small map, the actual locations in a larger map may vary slightly

=== Location ===
Nagfeni is located at 23.125324°N 84.681267°E

=== Area overview ===
The map alongside presents a rugged area, consisting partly of flat-topped hills called pat and partly of an undulating plateau, in the south-western portion of Chota Nagpur Plateau. Three major rivers – the Sankh, South Koel and North Karo - along with their numerous tributaries, drain the area. The hilly area has large deposits of Bauxite. 93.7% of the population lives in rural areas.

Note: The map alongside presents some of the notable locations in the district. All places marked in the map are linked in the larger full screen map.

== Demographics ==
According to the 2011 Census of India, Nagfeni had a total population of 1,700, of which 855 (50%) were males and 845 (50%) were females. Population in the age range 0–6 years was 300. The total number of literate persons in Nagfeni was 1,051 (75.07% of the population over 6 years).

(*For language details see Sisai block#Language and religion)

== Culture ==
There is a big rock in the shape of snake 'nag'. According to a popular legend, Maharaj Mutuk Nath Sah Deo was saved by a nag or cobra. He founded the Nagvanshi dynasty, that held sway over parts of the area now known as Jharkhand for many centuries.

Nagfeni is situated 14 km from Gumla on National Highway 43 (old numbering NH 23). The temples of Jagannath, Subhadra and Balarama were built in 1761. On the occasion of Makar Sankranti, thousands of devotees have a bath in the South Koel River before entering the temples on the banks of the river.

Ratha Yatra celebrated in the month of Ashadha (June–July) is an important event of the village.
