= Jalim =

Jalim Jalim Senai
- Village
- Location in Jharkhand, India Jalim (India)
- Coordinates: 23.424048°N 84.422667°E
- Country: India
- State: Jharkhand
- District: Gumla

Government
  - Type: Federal democracy

Population (2011)
  - Total: 880

Languages *
  - Official: Hindi, Urdu
- Time zone: UTC+5:30 (IST)
- PIN: 835220
- Telephone/ STD code: 06524
- Vehicle registration: JH 07
- Literacy: 57.00%
- Lok Sabha constituency: Lohardaga
- Vidhan Sabha constituency: Bishunpur
- Website: gumla.nic.in

Jalim (also called Jalim Senai) is a village and Bauxite mining site in the Bishunpur CD block in the Bishnupur subdivision of the Gumla district, Jharkhand, India.

== Geography ==
Cities, towns and locations in Gumla district in South Chotanagpur Division
M: municipality, CT: census town, R: rural/ urban centre, H: historical/ religious centre, T: tourist centre, B: Bauxite mining centre
Owing to space constraints in the small map, the actual locations in a larger map may vary slightly

Jalim is located at 23.424048°N 84.422667°E

Its surrounding area is rugged, comprising flat-topped hills and an undulating plateau, in the south-western portion of Chota Nagpur Plateau. Three major rivers – the Sankh, South Koel and North Karo - along with their numerous tributaries, drain the area. The hilly area has large deposits of Bauxite. 93.7% of the population lives in rural areas.

Note: The map alongside presents some of the notable locations in the district. All places marked in the map are linked in the larger full screen map.

== Demographics ==
According to the 2011 census of India, Jalim had a total population of 880, of which 431 (49%) were males and 449 (51%) were females. Population in the age range 0–6 years was 180. The total number of literate persons in Jalim was 399 (57.00% of the population over 6 years).

(*For language details see Bishunpur block#Language and religion)

== Bauxite mining ==
Bauxite and laterite (aluminium ore) is found in the villages of Amtipani, Langdatanr, Chirodih, Jalim, Narma, Bahagara and Gurdari of Bishunpur block, Langatanr, Lupungpat and Chota-agiatu in Chainpur block and Hanrup, Serengdag and Jalim in Ghaghra block. There are 21 bauxite mines in total.

The mines are operated using manual or semi-mechanised methods. After blasting, the bauxite is manually sorted and sized.

The Jalim and Senai Bauxite Mining Project is operated by Hindalco Industries.
