= Sadni Falls =

- Location within Jharkhand Location within India
- Location: Rajadera, Gumla district, Jharkhand, India
- Coordinates: 23°17′00″N 84°14′00″E
- Type: Snake
- Elevation: 934 metres (3,064 ft)
- Total height: 60 metres (200 ft)
- Watercourse: Sankh River

Sadni Falls (also called Sadnighagh Falls) is a waterfall located about 3 kilometres (1.9 mi) from Rajadera village in Gumla district in the Indian state of Jharkhand.

== Geography ==
Cities, towns and locations in Gumla district in South Chotanagpur Division
M: municipality, CT: census town, R: rural/ urban centre, H: historical/ religious centre, T: tourist centre, B: Bauxite mining centre
Owing to space constraints in the small map, the actual locations in a larger map may vary slightly

=== Location ===
Sadni Falls is located at 23.2833°N 84.2333°E

== The Falls ==
The 60 metres (200 ft) falls on the Sankh River is a scarp fall. It is referred to as a snake type falls and is a popular picnic spot. Its surroundings are spectacular with hillocks, forests and streams.

== History ==
Once upon a time, active diamond mines existed at Sadni Falls. These mines yielded many large and fine stones in the sixteenth and the seventeenth centuries.

== Transport ==
=== By rail ===
The nearest town Netarhat does not have a railway station. The closest railway station is at Ranchi, which is 110 kilometres away.

=== By road ===
There are regular bus services between Ranchi, the state capital and Netarhat. Sadni falls lie at a distance of 35 kilometres from Netarhat.

== See also ==
- List of waterfalls
- List of waterfalls in India
- List of waterfalls in India by height
