= Chik Baraik =

Weaver community of India

Total population
- 1,18,000 (2011 Census)

Regions with significant populations
- India
- Jharkhand: 54,163
- Chhattisgarh: 27,311 (1981 census)
- West Bengal: 21,376
- Odisha: 14,623
- Bihar: 2,135

Languages
- Nagpuri

Religion
- Hinduism, Ethnic religion

Related ethnic groups
- Pano, Panika

Chik Baraik or Baraik is a tribal community from the Chota Nagpur Plateau (present Jharkhand) and neighbouring states of Chhattisgarh, and Odisha in India. They are also called as Chik, Chikwa, Baraik, Badaik. They speak Nagpuri, Sadri as their mother tongue and Hindi as link language.

== Etymology ==
"Chik" means cloth in Prakrit. The title of "Baraik" was given to them by the kings.

== History ==
It is believed that they originated from a scare crow of Lord Shiva. According to a story, they used to be soldiers and palace guards during the reign of Nagvanshi dynasty. However, they later adopted the profession of weaving.

According to the story, the Nagvanshi king Bairisal entered into a ditch of a river in search of diamonds after his men were unable to find diamonds. But after two days, he didn't come out of the ditch. So Baraik and Munda thought that he might be eaten by fish and divided the kingdom among themselves to rule. On the seventh day, the king Bairisal came out of the ditch with diamonds and asked for water. The only person left was the caretaker of the horse, who was a person from an untouchable caste. The king drank water from the person and declared the person touchable. Then he ordered the Baraik and Munda to come. The munda came but Baraik didn't as he was unable to believe that king was alive. This angers the king and he orders to kill all the Baraik and many Baraiks were killed. To escape the wrath of the king many Baraik adopted the profession of weaving and became weavers.

During British Period, British ethnographers have given their opinions about Chik-baraik. According to British anthropologist Edward Tuite Dalton (1872), the Chik of South Chota Nagpur and other weaver castes such as Tanti, Panika, and Pan in feature are Aryan or hindu rather than Dravidian or Kolarian. They not follow Hindu restrictions on foods but worship Hindu god and goddess. They have no different culture to mark them different from Hindu race. In first census of India during British Raj in 1872, Chik-Baraik were annexed in tribe list as semi-Hindu aboriginal. In 1891 census, Herbert Hope Risley(1891) categorised Chik-Baraik as sub-caste of weaving caste Pans.

According to Risley in North Odisha, South and West Chotanagpur reside various weaver caste known by different names in different places such by Pamoa, Pab, Panika, Chik, Chik-Baraik, Baraik, Badaik, Pano, Ganda, Swansi/Samasi, Mahato, Tanti etc. According to him their origin is now difficult to trace but they have various totemic clans such as Bhainsa (Buffalo), Kachhuwa (Turtle), Nag (Corba), Raja Kauwa (Crow), Peacock, different types of dear, Wild berry etc. which connects them to Dravidian. Most Anthropologist conclude that Chik-Baraik are descendants of some Aryan weaving castes who settled in Chotanagpur at an early date.

== Clan system ==
They practice group endogamy and clan (Gotra) exogamy. There are several clan (Gotra) known as Vansh which are taken from various animals, plants, objects and places.

List of clans:

- Baghel (tiger)
- Barha (boar)
- Baunkra/Bakula (Heron)
- Besra (sparrowhawk)
- Bhengraj (king crow)
- Bichhwar (scorpion)
- Boda (Russell's viper)
- Chand (moon)
- Dhan (rice)
- Dundoar (owl)
- Gandha (flying bug)
- Hanuman (langur)
- Harin (deer)
- Induar (eel)
- Jamkiar
- Kachhua (turtle)
- Kansi (Kans grass)
- Kothi (coal oven)
- Kouwa (Crow)
- Kowriar
- Kusum (Schleichera Oleosa)
- Loharbans (Iron worker)
- Mahanandia
- Malua
- Masant
- Naurangi
- Panch bhaiya (five brothers)
- Parwar
- Rajhans (Swan)
- Singhi (Lion)
- Sona (gold)

They have titles such as Baraik, Ganjhu, Karjee, Chaudhary, Singh. They are the Sadan.

== Variations ==
They are known as Chik Baraik in Jharkhand. In Chhattisgarh, they are officially known as Chikwa. In Odisha, they are officially known as Badaik. They are patrilinial. Chik-baraik spread over Jharkhand, Chhattisgarh and Odisha.

== Occupation ==
Chik baraik were traditionally the tribal weaver scattered throughout southern and western part of Chota Nagpur Plateau. They make traditional dress like Dhoti, Sari, Karia. They have also been cultivators.

Their population is hardly found in large number settled at the same place due to their traditional occupation and also due to landlessness as they were mostly concerned with their job ignoring the land occupancy during early stage. To serve the population with weaving clothes for local needs, they got settled with other tribal communities in different villages and therefore are not found in large number of households.

Cultivation was their secondary occupation. In modern times, cheap and attractive clothes are overflowing in the market. Too much dependency on modern clothing has crippled traditional arts of weaving. Though their woven Lal paar cloth is coarse and relatively unattractive than modern cloth yet it enjoys seasonal demands for its ceremonial and ritual value.

Many have migrated to West Bengal, Assam to work in Tea gardens during the British Period. After the Independence of India, the majority left the arts of spinning, weaving and were employed in other work such as agriculture, industrial labour and government services.

== Culture ==
=== Rites and Rituals ===
Post natal rituals are Chhathi, Barahi, teen massi, Kan bedhi (ear piercing). Birth pollution observed for six days.

=== Marriage ===
They are divided into number of exogamous clans. Marriage proposals are initiated by boy's side. Bride price of five rupees is paid also with some food when marriage contracted. Monogamy is norm but polygamy is allowed. Some important marriage rituals are Madwa, barat, par ghani, duwar, sindoor dan, bidai.

=== Religion ===
Their deities are Devi Mai, Surjahi (Sun) and Bar Pahari (hill deity), family deities and village deities. They also worship moon, earth and other deities. Snake is also worshiped as ancestor of the caste.

=== Festivals ===
Their traditional festivals are Asari, Nawakhani, Karam, Surjahi Puja, Jitia, Sohrai, Sarhul, Fagun etc. Their folk dance are Jhumair, Domkach, Fagua etc.

=== Death rituals ===
They usually bury the dead along with valuable goods with head towards north in Masna. Now some have started to cremate. They observe death pollution for ten days.

== Official classification ==
Chik Baraik of Bihar, Jharkhand, West Bengal were listed as Scheduled Tribe. In Chhattisgarh, they are known as Chikwa and listed as Scheduled Caste. In Odisha they are listed as SEBC/OBC.

== See also ==
- Koshta
- Julaha
- Meghwal
- Kori
