= Gumla district =

- District
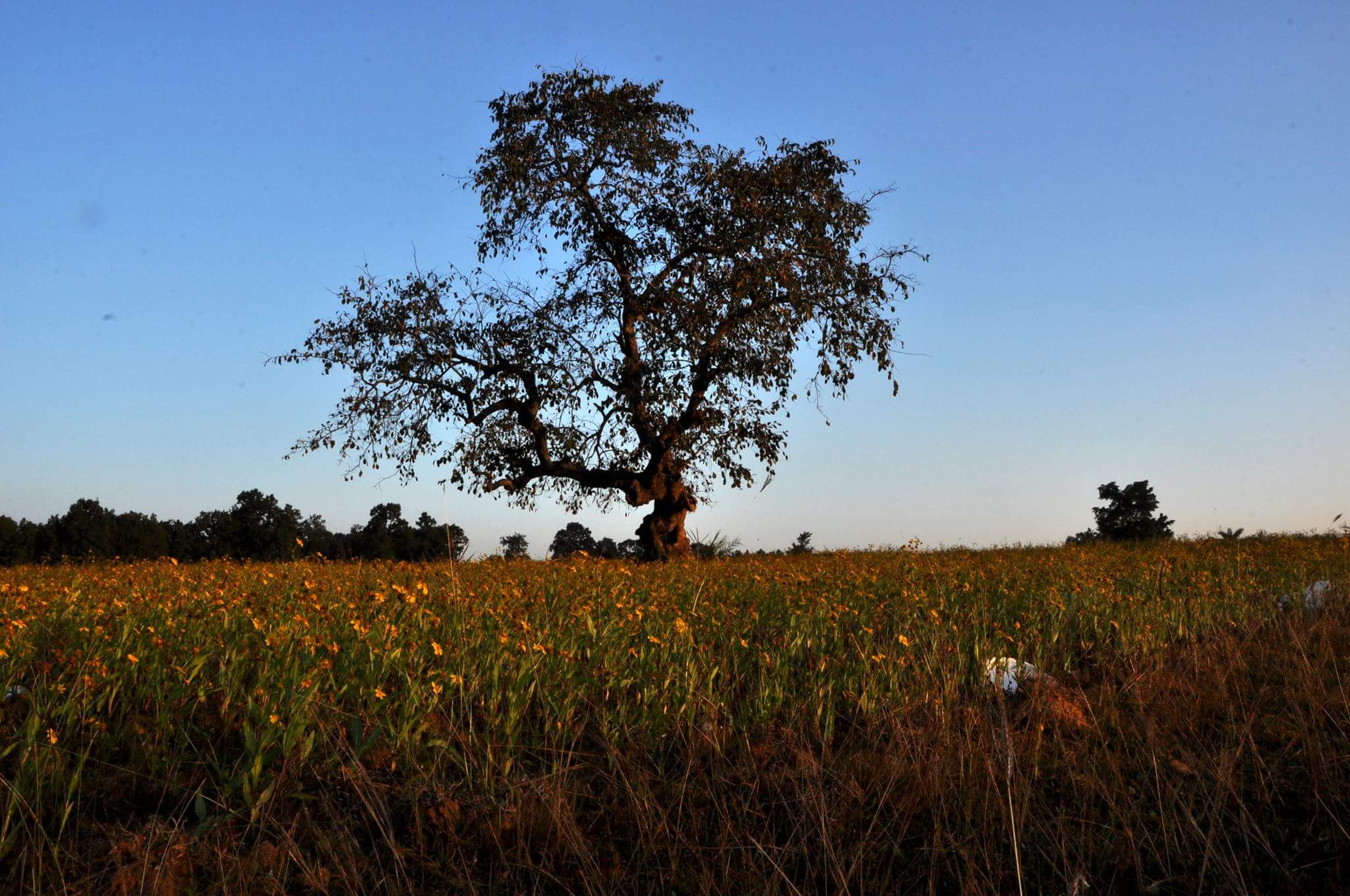
- Gumla Village area and Beautiful farming
- Interactive map of Gumla district
- Country: India
- State: Jharkhand
- Administrative Division: South Chotanagpur division
- Headquarters: Gumla

Government
  - Deputy Commissioner: Karn Satyarthi (IAS)

Area
  - Total: 5,327 km^{2} (2,057 sq mi)

Population (2011)
  - Total: 1,025,213
  - Density: 193/km^{2} (500/sq mi)

Languages
  - Official: Hindi
  - Regional: Sadri, Kurukh, kharia

Demographics
  - Literacy: 65.73%
  - Sex ratio: 993
- Time zone: UTC+5:30 (IST)
- ISO 3166 code: IN-JH
- Vehicle registration: JH 07
- Lok Sabha: Lohardaga (shared with Lohardaga district)
- Website: gumla.nic.in

Gumla district is one of the twenty-four districts of Jharkhand state, India, and Gumla town is the administrative headquarters of this district.

== Etymology ==
For centuries, the place was a meeting center for people from the hinterland who flocked here to exchange goods using the barter system and the place was called Gaw-Mela. Gumla is believed to derive its name from Gaw-Mela, which consists of two words of Hindi (also used in several local dialects), namely, Gaw (cows and the cattle) and Mela, that is, a fair. The place became known as Gaw-mela, and then the word transformed itself into Gumla.

== History ==
During regin of the Nagvanshi dynasty Navratangarh was one of the capital of Nagvanshi.

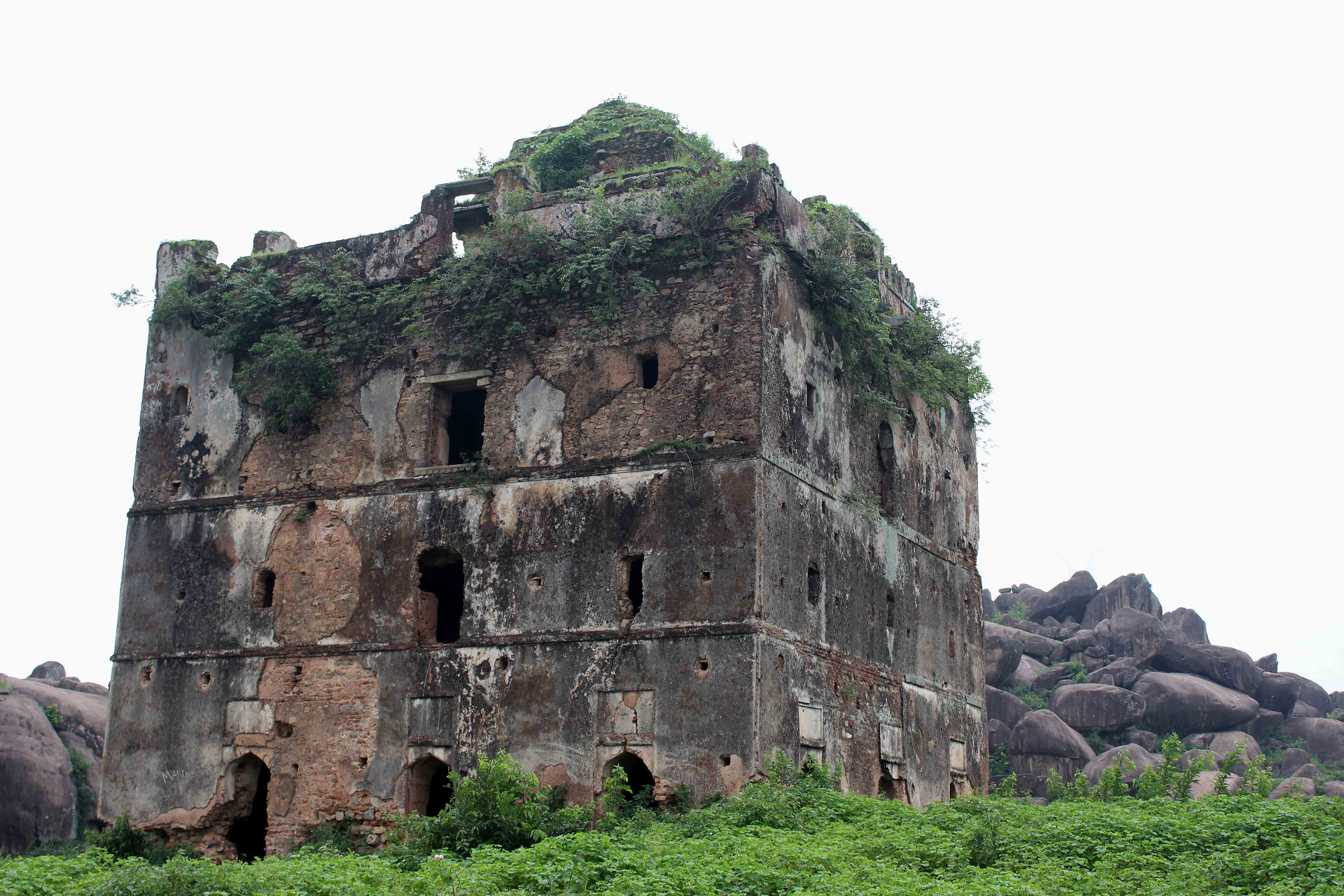
Navratangarh fort

During British rule Gumla was under Lohardaga district. In 1843 it was brought under Bishunpur province that was further named Ranchi. In fact Ranchi district came into existence in 1899. In 1902 Gumla became Sub-division under Ranchi district. On 18 May 1983 Gumla District came into existence. Sri Jagannath Mishra then ruling Chief Minister of Bihar inaugurated it and Sri Dwarika Nath Sinha acquired the post of first deputy commissioner of the newly created district.

Gumla is considered to be the birthplace of the Hindu God Hanuman. A temple a few kilometers away from the city off the Gumla-Ghaghra road is dedicated to him and his mother. The district contains mountains named Risyamook, which are mentioned in the Ramayana.

The district is currently a part of the Red Corridor.

== Geography ==
Gumla is located at 23°N 84.50°E. Geographically, Gumla is located on southern part of the Chota Nagpur Plateau which forms the eastern edge of the Deccan Plateau system.

There are three major rivers, which flow through the Gumla district viz. the South Koel, the North Koel and the Sankh. There are various streams/ tributaries to the main rivers on which there are some picturesque waterfalls, as for example Sadni Falls.

The terrain is highly undulating and there are existence of many rivers and streams. The forest cover of the district is 1.35 lakh hectares out of the total 5.21 lakh hectares of land i.e. round 27% of the total area of the district.

=== Climate ===
Climate of Gumla is characterized by a pleasant cold and temperate weather conditions. Gumla has a sub-tropical climate. Temperature ranges from maximum 40 to 20 °C during summer, and minimum 21 to 3 °C during winter. The annual rainfall is about 1450 mm. From June to September the rainfall level is about 1,150 mm.

== Administration ==
Deputy Commissioner and District Magistrate: Karn Satyarthi (IAS)

=== Administrative Units ===
==== Sub Divisions ====
There are 3 subdivisions in gumla district:

1. Gumla
1. Chainpur

==== Blocks/Anchals ====
Gumla district consists of 12 Blocks. The following are the list of the Blocks in Gumla district:

1. Basia block
2. Bharno block
3. Bishunpur block
4. Chainpur block
5. Dumri block
6. Ghaghra block
7. Gumla block
8. Kamdara block
9. Palkot block
10. Albert Ekka (Jari) block
11. Raidih block
12. Sisai block

==== Panchayats ====
There are 159 Panchayats in the district.

==== Villages ====
There are 952 Villages in the District.

== Politics ==
District	No.	Constituency	Name	Party	Alliance	Remarks	Gumla	67	Sisai	Jiga Susaran Horo	JMM
68	Gumla	Bhushan Tirkey					Gumla				JMM
69	Bishunpur	Chamra Linda	Cabinet minister				Gumla				JMM

== Demographics ==
Historical population
Year	Pop.	±%
1901	269,183	—
1911	314,439	+16.8%
1921	302,516	−3.8%
1931	355,262	+17.4%
1941	379,804	+6.9%
1951	421,922	+11.1%
1961	484,924	+14.9%
1971	557,041	+14.9%
1981	613,331	+10.1%
1991	707,555	+15.4%
2001	832,447	+17.7%
2011	1,025,213	+23.2%
Source: Census of India

Religions in Gumla district (2011)
Religion	Percent
ORP	44.62%
Hinduism	30.19%
Christianity	19.75%
Islam	5.02%
Others	0.41%
*ORP mostly adherents of Sarnaism

According to the 2011 census Gumla district has a population of 1,025,213, roughly equal to the nation of Cyprus or the US state of Montana. This gives it a ranking of 439rd in India (out of a total of 640). The district has a population density of 193 inhabitants per square kilometre (500/sq mi). Its population growth rate over the decade 2001-2011 was 23.21%. Gumla has a sex ratio of 993 females for every 1000 males and a literacy rate of 65.73%. 6.35% of the population lives in urban areas. Scheduled Castes and Scheduled Tribes make up 3.17% and 68.94% of the population respectively.

=== Languages ===
Languages of Gumla district (2011)
1. Sadri (50.8%)
2. Kurukh (29.6%)
3. Hindi (7.00%)
4. Mundari (4.69%)
5. Kharia (3.73%)
6. Urdu (2.31%)
7. Others (1.91%)

At the time of the 2011 Census of India, 50.75% of the population in the district spoke Sadri, 29.61% Kurukh, 7% Hindi, 4.69% Mundari, 3.73% Kharia and 2.31% Urdu as their first language.

== Economy ==
Gumla district has rich natural and mineral resources. There are 23 bauxite mines and 68 stone mines in Gumla district. Besides these there is good number of brick makers. In Gumla District the important minerals like bauxite and laterite (aluminium ore) are found in villages of Amkipani, Langdatanr, Chirodih, Jalim, Narma, Bahagara and Gurdari of Bishunpur block, Langatanr, Lupungpat and Chota-Agiatu in Chainpur block and Harup, Serengdag and Jalim in Ghaghra block. Beside these china clay is also found in some part of the district. Other mining activities like stone crusher, Brick kiln and stone chip mining lease are also available in different part of the district.

In 2006 the Indian government named Gumla one of the country's 250 most backward districts (out of a total of 640). It is one of the 21 districts in Jharkhand currently receiving funds from the Backward Regions Grant Fund Programme (BRGF).

== Education ==
In 1986, Rakesh Popli and his wife, Rama (an expert in childhood education), founded the first Ekal Vidyalaya (one-teacher) schools to bring education to the tribes of the region. From 2018, Deptt. of Higher and Technical Education, Govt. of Jharkhand is going to start Polytechnic College "Gumla Polytechnic". The Polytechnic college will be run and manage under "PPP" Mode by Gumla Educational Foundation.

Three colleges under Ranchi University:

- Kartik Oraon College
- Karunavati Devi Memorial College
- Women's College

Technical Institute

- Gumla Polytechnic
- IIST Computer Institute
- Media INFOTECH
- Wings IT

Schools in Gumla:

- Adarsh Vidya Mandir School, Pugu
- Chanchal Cygnus School, Dumerdih
- D.A.V. Public School, Neemtoli
- Don Bosco School, Bhamni
- Kendriya Vidyalaya Gumla
- Notre Dame School
- Oxford Public School
- S.S. High School
- Saraswati Shishu-Vidya Mandir
- Solitaire Educational Academy
- St. Patrick School
- St. Stephen's School
- Ursuline Convent School
- Wescott Public School
- PM SHRI SCHOOL Jawahar Navodaya Vidyalaya, Masaria Dam

St. Ignatius School, founded in 1935 and administered by the Jesuits, has produced international-level hockey players.

== Culture ==
Gumla has a rich culture. The majority of people speak Nagpuri and Hindi.

- Karma - A holy festival celebrated by the people in almost all places of this district.
- Sarhul - A festival celebrated by the people and Jhankis and Rallies were organised around the main town Gumla. Ladies put flowers (Gulaichi Flower) on their hair and gents put it on their ears.
- Ramnavami - A holy festival celebrated with huge sound, and Jhankies and Rallies.

== Tourist attractions ==
- Palkot Fort- Palkot Fort is a historic place which was one of the capital of the Nagvanshi dynasty. It is located in Palkot block of the district.
- Palkot Wildlife Sanctuary
- Anjan - Small village about 18 km (11 mi) away from Gumla. The name of the village has been derived from the name of goddess Anjani, mother of Hanuman. Many objects of archeological importance obtained from this place have been placed at Patna Museum. It is believed to be the birthplace of Lord Hanuman.
- Hapamuni - The ancient village Mahamaya temple that is the identity of this village. Hapamuni Mahamaya temple traces its origin to 11th century. It also has some ancient rock sculpture in front of temple dating to that period. Moreover, with the arrival of Hapamuni agro tech, the village economy has reached new dimensions.
- Nagfeni - It is known for the Jagannath temple and there is a big rock in the shape of snake 'Nag'.
- Navratangarh- It was the seat of old Nagvanshi kings located in Sisai block of the district. The fort of navratangarh is made by the king Durjansaal and it is the administration capital of Durjansaal .
- Tanginath - Tanginath Dham is located in Gumla's Dumri block. Several devotees during the month of Shravan come to shrine which goes back to seventh or ninth Century AD.
