= Sankh River =

River in India

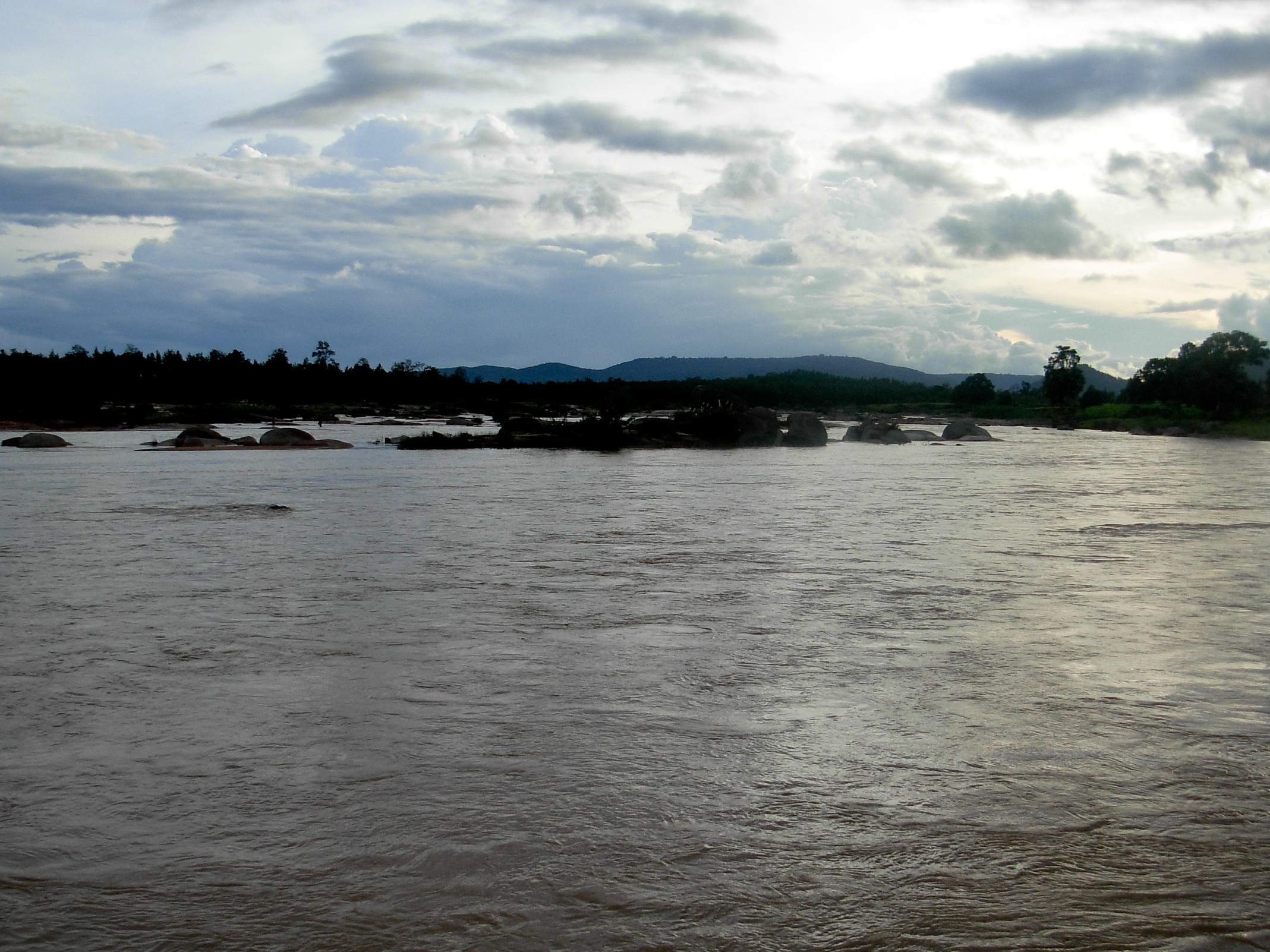
- Sankh River
- Native name: ଶଙ୍ଖ ନଦୀ (Odia)

Location
- Country: India
- State: Jharkhand, Chhattisgarh, Odisha

Physical characteristics
- Source: Lupungpat village
  - location: Gumla district, Jharkhand
  - coordinates: 23°14′N 84°16′E
  - elevation: 1,000 m (3,300 ft)
- Mouth: Confluence with Koel River to form Brahmani River
- Length: 240 km (150 mi)

The Sankh River flows across Jharkhand, Chhattisgarh and Odisha states in India. The river flows for 240 kilometres (150 mi) before it meets the Koel River in Odisha.

== Course ==
The river starts 1,000 metres (3,300 ft) above sea level in Lupungpat village in Gumla district in Jharkhand and flows 67.5 kilometres (41.9 mi) in the state before entering Chhattisgarh. It runs for about 50 kilometres (31 mi) in Chhattisgarh and enters Jharkhand where it flows for another 78 kilometres (48 mi). The river finally enters Odisha and travels another 45 kilometres (28 mi) before merging with the Koel. The South Koel enters Odisha and joins the Sankh River at Vedavyas near Rourkela from where it is called the Brahmani (see 22°14′45″N 84°47′02″E).

== Sadni Falls ==
The 60-metre (200 ft) high Sadni Falls on the Sankh River at the edge of the Ranchi plateau is an example of scarp falls or knick line falls.

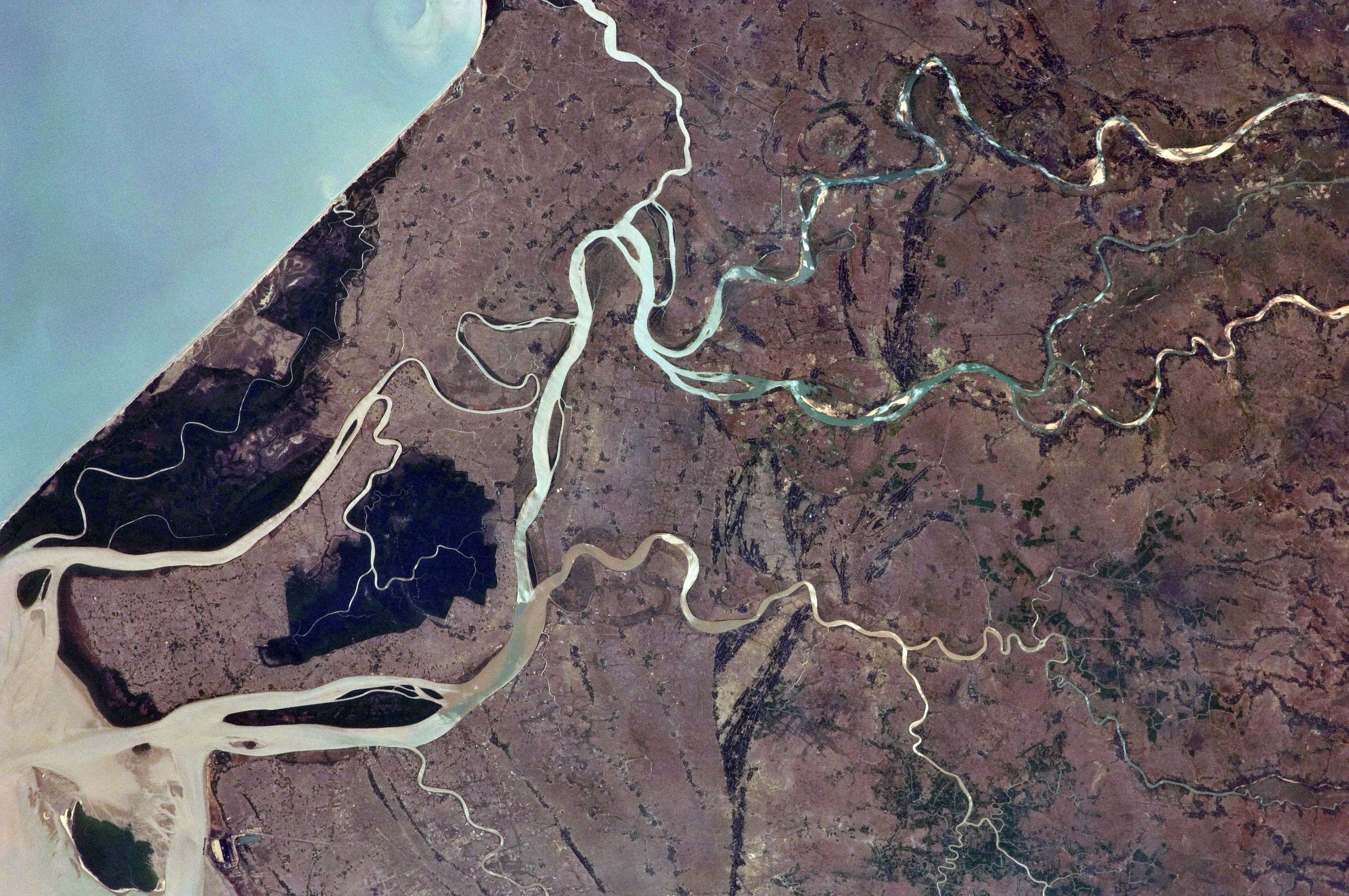
Aerial ସଟେଲାଇଟ ତୁ ବ୍ରାହ୍ମଣୀ ନଦୀର ଚିତ୍ର
