= Kuru, Lohardaga =

Kuru
- Village
- Location in Jharkhand, India Kuru (India)
- Coordinates: 23.5544°N 84.8192°E
- Country: India
- State: Jharkhand
- District: Lohardaga

Government
  - Type: Federal democracy

Population (2011)
  - Total: 6,676

Languages *
  - Official: Hindi, Urdu
- Time zone: UTC+5:30 (IST)
- PIN: 835213
- Telephone/ STD code: 06526
- Vehicle registration: JH 08
- Literacy: 78.08%
- Lok Sabha constituency: Lohardaga
- Vidhan Sabha constituency: Loharadaga
- Website: lohardaga.nic.in

Kuru is a village in the Kuru CD block in the Lohardaga Sadar subdivision of the Lohardaga district in the Indian state of Jharkhand.

== Geography ==
Cities, towns and locations in Lohardaga district in South Chotanagpur Division
M: municipality, R: rural/ urban centre, B: Bauxite mining centre
Owing to space constraints in the small map, the actual locations in a larger map may vary slightly

=== Location ===
Kuru is located at 23.5544°N 84.8192°E

=== Area overview ===
The map alongside shows an undulating plateau area with the hilly tract in the west and north-west. Three Bauxite mining centres are marked. It is an overwhelmingly rural district with 87.6% of the population living in the rural areas.

Note: The map alongside presents some of the notable locations in the district. All places marked in the map are linked in the larger full screen map.

== Civic administration ==
=== Police station ===
There is a police station at Kuru.

=== CD block HQ ===
The headquarters of Kuru CD block are located at Kuru village.

== Demographics ==
According to the 2011 Census of India, Kuru had a total population of 6,676, of which 3,361 (50%) were males and 3,315 (50%) were females. Population in the age range 0–6 years was 1,093. The total number of literate persons in Kuru was 4,359 (78.08% of the population over 6 years).

(*For language details see Kuru block#Language and religion)

== Education ==
Kasturba Gandhi Balika Vidyalaya is a Hindi-medium girls only institution established in 2006. It has facilities for teaching from class VI to class X. The school has a playground, a library with 700 books and has 5 computers for learning and teaching purposes.

Project Girls High School is a Hindi-medium girls only institution established in 1982. It has facilities for teaching in classes IX and X. The school has a library with 1,861 books.

Gandhi Memorial High School Maradi is a Hindi-medium coeducational institution established at Maradih in 1964. It has facilities for teaching from class IX to class XII. The school has a playground and a library with 1,200 books.
