= Bagru, Lohardaga =

Bagru
- Village
- Location in Jharkhand, India Bagru (India)
- Coordinates: 23.4734°N 84.6243°E
- Country: India
- State: Jharkhand
- District: Lohardaga

Government
  - Type: Federal democracy

Population (2011)
  - Total: 2,536

Languages *
  - Official: Hindi, Urdu
- Time zone: UTC+5:30 (IST)
- PIN: 835302
- Telephone/ STD code: 06526
- Vehicle registration: JH 08
- Literacy: 62.52%
- Lok Sabha constituency: Lohardaga
- Vidhan Sabha constituency: Loharadaga
- Website: lohardaga.nic.in

Bagru is a village in the Kisko CD block in the Lohardaga Sadar subdivision of the Lohardaga district in the Indian state of Jharkhand.

== Geography ==
Cities, towns and locations in Lohardaga district in South Chotanagpur Division
M: municipality, R: rural/ urban centre, B: Bauxite mining centre
Owing to space constraints in the small map, the actual locations in a larger map may vary slightly

=== Location ===
Bagru is located at 23.4734°N 84.6243°E

=== Area overview ===
The map alongside shows an undulating plateau area with the hilly tract in the west and north-west. Three Bauxite mining centres are marked. It is an overwhelmingly rural district with 87.6% of the population living in the rural areas.

Note: The map alongside presents some of the notable locations in the district. All places marked in the map are linked in the larger full screen map.

== Civic administration ==
=== Police station ===
There is a police station at Bagru.

== Demographics ==
According to the 2011 Census of India, Bagru had a total population of 2,536, of which 1,262 (50%) were males and 1,274 (50%) were females. Population in the age range 0–6 years was 420. The total number of literate persons in Bagru was 2,008 (62.52% of the population over 6 years).

(*For language details see Kisko block#Language and religion)

== Bauxite mines ==
India's first alumina refinery was commissioned at Chota Muri, 65 km from Ranchi, by the erstwhile Indian Aluminium Company in 1948. It was taken over by the Hindalco Industries of the Aditya Birla Group in 2005. Bauxite was first mined in India in 1906 in Madhya Pradesh. It was after the Second World War that the demand for aluminium went up.

Lohardaga is known for producing world class bauxite. Hindalco Industries Ltd has 7 mining leases out of 9 active mines in Lohardaga district which supplies bauxite to Hindalco's aluminium plants at Muri and Renukoot. A ropeway connecting Bagru mines and Lohardaga has been a popular tourist attraction.

Bauxite mining on the Chota Nagpur Plateau is restricted mainly to Lohardaga and Gumla districts. Bagru Hill mine is operated as a mechanised open cast mine. The overburden is worked in benches in stages. The Bagru Hill Bauxite ore is blended with Bauxite from Bhusar mine. In Gumla district Jalim Senai, Gurdari and Serangdag mines of Hindalco are operated manually/ semi-mechanised methods.
