= Bhandra, Lohardaga =

Bhandra
- Village
- Location in Jharkhand, India Bhandra (India)
- Coordinates: 23.3626°N 84.7986°E
- Country: India
- State: Jharkhand
- District: Lohardaga

Government
  - Type: Federal democracy

Population (2011)
  - Total: 3,545

Languages *
  - Official: Hindi, Urdu
- Time zone: UTC+5:30 (IST)
- PIN: 835203
- Telephone/ STD code: 06526
- Vehicle registration: JH 08
- Literacy: 73.54%
- Lok Sabha constituency: Lohardaga
- Vidhan Sabha constituency: Loharadaga
- Website: lohardaga.nic.in

Bhandra is a village in the Bhandra CD block in the Lohardaga Sadar subdivision of the Lohardaga district in the Indian state of Jharkhand.

== Geography ==
Cities, towns and locations in Lohardaga district in South Chotanagpur Division
M: municipality, R: rural/ urban centre, B: Bauxite mining centre
Owing to space constraints in the small map, the actual locations in a larger map may vary slightly

=== Location ===
Bhandra is located at 23.3626°N 84.7986°E

=== Area overview ===
The map alongside shows an undulating plateau area with the hilly tract in the west and north-west. Three Bauxite mining centres are marked. It is an overwhelmingly rural district with 87.6% of the population living in the rural areas.

Note: The map alongside presents some of the notable locations in the district. All places marked in the map are linked in the larger full screen map.

== Civic administration ==
=== Police station ===
There is a police station at Bhandra.

=== CD block HQ ===
The headquarters of Bhandra CD block are located at Bhandra village.

== Demographics ==
According to the 2011 Census of India, Bhandra had a total population of 3,545, of which 1,755 (50%) were males and 1,790 (50%) were females. Population in the age range 0–6 years was 575. The total number of literate persons in Bhandra was 2,184 (73.54% of the population over 6 years).

(*For language details see Bhandra block#Language and religion)

== Education ==
Kasturba Gandhi Balika Vidyalaya is a Hindi-medium girls only institution established in 2006. It has facilities for teaching from class VI to class XII. The school has a playground, a library with 892 books and has 5 computers for learning and teaching purposes.

Vansidha Project Girls High School Bhandra is a Hindi-medium girls only institution established in 1984. It has facilities for teaching from class VII to class X. The school has a playground.

Lal Bahadur Shastri High School Bhandra is a Hindi-medium coeducational institution established in 1964. It has facilities for teaching from class IX to class XII.
