= Peshrar =

Village of Lohardaga district with police station and headquarters of CD block

- Village
- Location in Jharkhand, India Peshrar (India)
- Coordinates: 23.5704°N 84.5557°E
- Country: India
- State: Jharkhand
- District: Lohardaga

Government
  - Type: Federal democracy

Population (2011)
  - Total: 1,308

Languages *
  - Official: Hindi, Urdu
- Time zone: UTC+5:30 (IST)
- PIN: 835302
- Telephone/ STD code: 06526
- Vehicle registration: JH 08
- Literacy: 49.07%
- Lok Sabha constituency: Lohardaga
- Vidhan Sabha constituency: Loharadaga
- Website: lohardaga.nic.in

Peshrar is a village in the Peshrar CD block in the Lohardaga Sadar subdivision of the Lohardaga district in the Indian state of Jharkhand.

== Geography ==
Cities, towns and locations in Lohadaga district in South Chotanagpur Division
M: municipality, R: rural/ urban centre, B: Bauxite mining centre
Owing to space constraints in the small map, the actual locations in a larger map may vary slightly

=== Location ===
Peshrar is located at 23.5704°N 84.5557°E

=== Area overview ===
The map alongside shows an undulating plateau area with the hilly tract in the west and north-west. Three Bauxite mining centres are marked. It is an overwhelmingly rural district with 87.6% of the population living in the rural areas.

Note: The map alongside presents some of the notable locations in the district. All places marked in the map are linked in the larger full screen map.

== Civic administration ==
=== Police station ===
There is a police station at Peshrar.

=== CD block HQ ===
The headquarters of Peshrar CD block are located at Peshrar village.

== Demographics ==
According to the 2011 Census of India, Pesrar had a total population of 1,308, of which 693 (53%) were males and 615 (47%) were females. Population in the age range 0–6 years was 289. The total number of literate persons in Pesrar was 500 (49.07% of the population over 6 years).

(*For language details see Peshrar block#Language and religion)

== Education ==
Middle School Peshrar is a Hindi-medium coeducational institution established in 2003. It has facilities for teaching from class I to class VIII.

Project High School Mungo is a Hindi-medium coeducational institution established in 1981. It has facilities for teaching from class VI to class X.
