= Bhandra block =

Bhandra
- Community development block
- Coordinates: 23.3626°N 84.7986°E
- Country: India
- State: Jharkhand
- District: Lohardaga

Government
  - Type: Federal democracy

Area
  - Total: 160.48 km^{2} (61.96 sq mi)

Population (2011)
  - Total: 57,303
  - Density: 357.07/km^{2} (924.81/sq mi)

Languages
  - Official: Hindi, Urdu
- Time zone: UTC+5:30 (IST)
- PIN: 835325
- Telephone/STD code: 06526
- Vehicle registration: JH 08
- Literacy: 63.27%
- Lok Sabha constituency: Lohardaga
- Vidhan Sabha constituency: Lohardaga
- Website: lohardaga.nic.in

Bhandra block is a CD block that forms an administrative division in the Lohardaga subdivision of Lohardaga district, in the Indian state of Jharkhand.

== History ==
Lohardaga was made a subdivision of Ranchi district in 1972. Ranchi district was split into three districts namely Ranchi, Gumla and Lohardaga, in 1983.

== Maoist activities ==
Lohardaga has been identified as an “A” grade highly Maoist infested district. Kuru, Bhandra, Kairo, Kisko, Jowang and Senha police stations are totally affected and Lohardaga police station is partially affected. The Maoist outfits are mainly interested in extorting the bauxite mining and transport industry. The police force has been trained to take on the Maoist outfits and has been extending support at important points. Lohardaga has lost one Superintendent of Police, Ajay Kumar Singh, IPS in the anti-insurgency operations.

== Geography ==
Bhandara is located at 23.3626°N 84.7986°E.

Lohardaga district consists of two broad physiographic divisions – the hilly tract and the plateau region. The hilly tract extends over the western and north-western parts of the district. The high hill tops of this region are known as pat. The plateau region is a part of the Gumla Plateau, which lies in the southern portion of Chota Nagpur Plateau. Lohardaga and Bhandra CD blocks are entirely in the plateau region. Other administrative areas, such as Kisko, Senha and Kuru CD blocks are partly in the plateau region and partly in the hilly tract.

Bhandara CD block is bounded by the Kairo CD block on the north, Bero CD block in Ranchi district on the east, Bherno CD block in Gumla district on the south and Senha and Lohardaga CD blocks on the west.

Bhandra CD block has an area of 160.48 km^{2}.Bhandra police station serves Bhandra CD block. The headquarters of Bhandra CD block is located at Bhandra village.

== Demographics ==
=== Population ===
According to the 2011 Census of India, Bhandra CD block had a total population of 57,303, all of which were rural. There were 28,754 (50%) males and 28,549 (50%) females. Population in the age range 0–6 years was 9,765. Scheduled Castes numbered 2979 (1.71%) and Scheduled Tribes numbered 43,491 (63.93%).

=== Literacy ===
According to the 2011 census, the total number of literate persons in Bhandra CD block was 30,078 (63.27% of the population over 6 years) out of which males numbered 17,426 (73.24% of the male population over 6 years) and females numbered 12,652 (53.28% of the female population over 6 years). The gender disparity (the difference between female and male literacy rates) was 22.34%.

As of 2011 census, literacy in Lohardaga district was 78.62%. Literacy in Jharkhand was 67.63% in 2011. Literacy in India in 2011 was 74.04%.

See also – List of Jharkhand districts ranked by literacy rate

Literacy in CD Blocks of
Lohardaga district
Lohardaga subdivision
Kisko – 64.54%
Peshrar – 54.25%
Kuru – 67.36%
Kairo – 64.36%
Lohardaga – 67.73%
Senha – 66.06%
Bhandra block – 63.27%
Source: 2011 Census: CD block Wise
Primary Census Abstract Data

=== Language and religion ===
Religions in Bhandra block (2011)
Religion	Percent
Sarna	58.54%
Hinduism	24.10%
Islam	13.68%
Christianity	3.54%
Other or not stated	0.14%

According to the District Census Handbook, Lohardaga, 2011 census, “the distribution of different mother tongues (languages mentioned under 8th Schedule of Constitution of India) as returned during the 2001 Census for Lohardaga district was” Kurukh (42.15%), Hindi (39.66%), Urdu (16.46%) and other languages 1.73%.

According to the Population by Mother Tongue in the 2011 Census of India, 38.96% of the population in the Lohardaga district spoke Kurukh, 33.17% Sadri, 13.87% Urdu, 12.5% Hindi and other languages 1.50% as their first language.

Hindi is the official language in Jharkhand and Urdu has been declared as an additional official language.

According to the District Census Handbook, Lohardaga, 2011 census, ‘Other Religions and Persuasions’ formed 47.2% of the population, followed by Hindus (28.6%), Muslims (20.1%), Christians (4.0%).

The Oraon people dominate in Lohardaga district. In the 2001 census they numbered 164,379 and formed 80.95% of the Scheduled Tribes population, who in turn constituted 55.70% of the population in the district. The Lohras formed 4.79% of the ST population.

Languages in Bhandra block (2011)
1. Kurukh (48.60%)
2. Nagpuri (40.43%)
3. Urdu (5.74%)
4. Hindi (4.97%)
5. Others (0.26%)

== Rural poverty ==
70-80% of the population of Lohardaga district were in the BPL category in 2004–2005. In 2011-12, the proportion of BPL population in Lohardaga district came down to 38.0%. According to a study in 2013 (modified in 2019), "the incidence of poverty in Jharkhand is estimated at 46%, but 60% of the scheduled castes and scheduled tribes are still below poverty line."

== Economy ==
=== Livelihood ===
Livelihood
in Bhandra CD block
1. Cultivators (66.2%)
2. Agricultural labourers (25.2%)
3. Household industries (1.14%)
4. Other Workers (7.44%)

In Bhandra CD block in 2011, amongst the class of total workers, cultivators numbered 20,718 and formed 66.23%, agricultural labourers numbered 7,888 and formed 25.21%, household industry workers numbered 358 and formed 1.14% and other workers numbered 2,320 and formed 7.44%. Total workers numbered 31,284 and formed 54.59% of the total population, and non-workers numbered 26,019 and formed 45.41of the population.

=== Infrastructure ===
There are 45 inhabited villages in Bhandra CD block. In 2011, 16 villages had power supply. 4 villages had tap water (treated/ untreated), 45 villages had well water (covered/ uncovered), 45 villages had hand pumps, and all villages have drinking water facility. 9 villages had post offices, 4 villages had sub post offices, 7 villages had telephones (land lines), 30 villages had mobile phone coverage. 45 villages had pucca (paved) village roads, 7 villages had bus service (public/ private), 10 villages had autos/ modified autos, 26 villages had tractors. 6 villages had bank branches, 2 villages had agricultural credit societies, 32 villages had public distribution system, 35 villages had assembly polling stations.

=== Agriculture ===
Large areas of the district were earlier covered with forests. With gradual deforestation, more land is being brought under cultivation. At present around 32-35% of the total area is covered with forests. Rice is grown in the terraced lowlands called don. In the uplands called tanr, a coarse form of rice, millets, pulses and oil seeds are grown. Agriculture is mostly monsoon-dependent. “The wells, springs and ahars are the only traditional sources of irrigation. The average land holding per household is 1.65 Ha. The per capita agriculture land is around 0.28 Ha. Net irrigated area is 13.4% of net sown area”.

=== Bauxite ===
Bauxite is the raw material from which aluminium is produced. Lohardaga district has large reserves of world class bauxite across Pakhar, Hisari, Rudhali Pat, Khamar Pat and the mining area also extends to neighbouring districts. The district has approval of mining of approximately 11 lakh tones of bauxite mineral in a year. Hindalco Industries Ltd has 7 mining leases out of 9 active mines in Lohardaga district which supplies bauxite to Hindalco’s aluminium plants at Muri and Renukoot. A ropeway connecting Bagru mines and Lohardaga has been a popular tourist attraction.

=== Backward Regions Grant Fund ===
Lohardaga district is listed as a backward region and receives financial support from the Backward Regions Grant Fund. The fund, created by the Government of India, is designed to redress regional imbalances in development. As of 2012, 272 districts across the country were listed under this scheme. The list includes 21 districts of Jharkhand.

== Education ==
Bhandra CD block had 8 villages with pre-primary schools, 43 villages with primary schools, 21 villages with middle schools, 2 villages with secondary schools, 2 villages had no educational facility.
.*Senior secondary schools are also known as Inter colleges in Jharkhand

== Healthcare ==
Bhandra CD block had 7 villages with primary health centres, 20 villages with primary health subcentres, 15 villages with maternity and child welfare centres, 7 villages with allopathic hospitals, 4 villages with dispensaries, 11 villages with veterinary hospitals, 15 villages with family welfare centres, 1 village with medicine shop.
.*Private medical practitioners, alternative medicine etc. not included
