= Senha =

- Village
- Location in Jharkhand, India3 Senha (India)
- Coordinates: 23.3868°N 84.6516°E
- Country: India
- State: Jharkhand
- District: Lohardaga

Government
  - Type: Federal democracy

Population (2011)
  - Total: 7,011

Languages *
  - Official: Hindi, Urdu
- Time zone: UTC+5:30 (IST)
- PIN: 835302
- Telephone/ STD code: 06526
- Vehicle registration: JH 08
- Literacy: 75.79%
- Lok Sabha constituency: Lohardaga
- Vidhan Sabha constituency: Loharadaga
- Website: lohardaga.nic.in

Senha is a village in the Senha CD block in the Lohardaga Sadar subdivision of the Lohardaga district in the Indian state of Jharkhand.

== Geography ==
Cities, towns and locations in Lohadaga district in South Chotanagpur Division
M: municipality, R: rural/ urban centre, B: Bauxite mining centre
Owing to space constraints in the small map, the actual locations in a larger map may vary slightly

=== Location ===
Senha is located at 23.3868°N 84.6516°E

=== Area overview ===
The map alongside shows an undulating plateau area with the hilly tract in the west and north-west. Three Bauxite mining centres are marked. It is an overwhelmingly rural district with 87.6% of the population living in the rural areas.

Note: The map alongside presents some of the notable locations in the district. All places marked in the map are linked in the larger full screen map.

== Civic administration ==
=== Police station ===
There is a police station at Senha.

=== CD block HQ ===
The headquarters of Senha CD block are located at Senha village.

== Demographics ==
According to the 2011 Census of India, Senha had a total population of 7,011, of which 3,562 (51%) were males and 3,449 (49%) were females. Population in the age range 0–6 years was 1,034. The total number of literate persons in Senha was 4,530 (75.79% of the population over 6 years).

(*For language details see Senha block#Language and religion)

== Education ==
Kasturba Gandhi Balika Vidyalaya is a Hindi-medium girls only institution established in 2006. It has facilities for teaching from class VI to class XII. The school has a playground, a library with 1,345 books and has 5 computers for learning and teaching purposes.

Sushila Devi Girls High School Senha is a Hindi-medium girls only institution established in 1984. it has facilities for teaching from class VII to class X. The school has a playground, a library with 230 books and has 2 computers for teaching and learning purposes.

St. Marks Middle School Senha is a Hindi-medium coeducational institution established in 1999. It has facilities for teaching from class I to class VIII. Coeducational high schools are about 10 km away.
