= Kisko block =

Kisko
- Community development block
- Coordinates: 23.5184°N 84.6657°E
- Country: India
- State: Jharkhand
- District: Lohardaga

Government
  - Type: Federal democracy

Area
  - Total: 253.29 km^{2} (97.80 sq mi)

Population (2011)
  - Total: 54,959
  - Density: 216.98/km^{2} (561.98/sq mi)

Languages
  - Official: Hindi, Urdu
- Time zone: UTC+5:30 (IST)
- PIN: 835302
- Telephone/STD code: 06526
- Vehicle registration: JH 08
- Literacy: 64.54%
- Lok Sabha constituency: Lohardaga
- Vidhan Sabha constituency: Lohardaga
- Website: lohardaga.nic.in

Kisko block is a community development block (CD block in the Lohardaga subdivision of Lohardaga district, Jharkhand, India.

== History ==
Lohardaga became a subdivision of Ranchi district in 1972. In 1983, Ranchi district was split into three districts: Ranchi, Gumla and Lohardaga.

== Geography ==
Lohardaga district consists of two broad physiographic divisions: the hilly tract and the plateau region. The hilly tract extends over the western and north-western parts of the district. The high hill tops of this region are known as pat. The plateau region is a part of the Gumla Plateau, which is located in the southern portion of the Chota Nagpur Plateau. Kisko block is partly in the plateau region and partly in the hilly tract.

Kisko block is bounded by Latehar block to the north, Kuru block and Lohardaga block to the east, Senha block to the south, and Peshrar block to the west.

Kisko block has an area of 253.29 km^{2}. The headquarters of the block are located in Kisko village. The block is served by the Kisko police station.

== Demographics ==
=== Population ===
According to the 2011 census of India, Kisko block had a population of 54,959, all of whom lived in rural areas. There were 27,692 (50.39%) males and 27,267 (49.61%) females. The population in the 0–6 age range was 9,373 (17.05%). Scheduled Castes numbered 1,663 (3.03%) and Scheduled Tribes numbered 33,559 (61.06%).

=== Literacy ===
According to the 2011 census, the total number of literate persons in Kisko block was 29,422 (64.54% of the population over 6 years of age), of whom 17,212 (74.89% of the male population over 6 years of age) were male and 12,210 (54.02% of the female population over 6 years of age) were female. The gender disparity (the difference between female and male literacy rates) was 20.87%.

As of the 2011 census, the literacy rate in the Lohardaga district was 78.62%, while the literacy rate in Jharkhand was 67.63%, and the national rate was 74.04%.

See also – List of Jharkhand districts ranked by literacy rate

Literacy in CD Blocks of
Lohardaga district
Lohardaga subdivision
Kisko – 64.54%
Peshrar – 54.25%
Kuru – 67.36%
Kairo – 64.36%
Lohardaga – 67.73%
Senha – 66.06%
Bhandra block – 63.27%
Source: 2011 Census: CD block Wise
Primary Census Abstract Data

=== Language and religion ===
Religions in Kisko block (2011)
Religion	Percent
Sarna	54.68%
Islam	23.31%
Hinduism	16.79%
Christianity	5.01%
Other or not stated	0.21%

Languages of Kisko block (2011)
1. Kurukh (36.4%)
2. Nagpuri (32.8%)
3. Urdu (20.0%)
4. Hindi (7.08%)
5. Mundari (3.43%)
6. Others (0.30%)

According to the 2011 census, 36.35% of the population spoke Kurukh as their first language, followed by Sadri (32.83%), Urdu (20.01%), Hindi (7.08%), and Mundari (3.43%).

== Rural poverty ==
In 2005, an estimated 70–80% of the population of Lohardaga district were in the Below Poverty Line (BPL) category in 2004–2005. By 2011–12, the proportion of the population classified as BPL had decreased to 38.0%. According to a 2013 study, the incidence of poverty in Jharkhand was estimated at 46%, although 60% of the scheduled castes and scheduled tribes remained below the poverty line."

== Economy ==
=== Livelihood ===
Livelihood
in Kisko CD block
1. Cultivators (42.1%)
2. Agricultural labourers (45.9%)
3. Household industries (2.25%)
4. Other Workers (9.77%)

In Kisko block in 2011, cultivators numbered 12,209 and constituted 42.13% of the total workforce, agricultural labourers numbered 13,288 (45.85%), household industry workers numbered 652 (2.25%), and other workers numbered 2,832 (9.77%). Total workers numbered 28,981, constituting 52.73% of the total population.

=== Infrastructure ===
There are 52 inhabited villages in Kisko block. In 2011, ten villages had a power supply. Five villages had tap water (treated or untreated), fifty-two villages had well water (covered or uncovered), forty-eight villages had hand pumps, and all villages had drinking water facilities. Nine villages had post offices, five villages had telephones (land lines), and thirteen villages had mobile phone coverage.

All 52 villages had paved roads; six had bus service (public or private), thirteen had auto rickshaws or modified autos, seven had taxis or vans, and eighteen had tractors. Seven villages had bank branches, five had agricultural credit societies, twenty-one had public distribution system facilities, and thirty-two had assembly polling stations.

=== Agriculture ===
Large areas of the district were formerly covered with forests. With gradual deforestation, more land has been brought under cultivation. At present, around 32–35% of the total area is forested. Rice is grown in the terraced lowlands, known as don. In the uplands, known as tanr, a coarse form of rice, millets, pulses and oil seeds are grown. Agriculture is largely monsoon-dependent. "The wells, springs and ahars are the only traditional sources of irrigation. The average land holding per household is 1.65 Ha. The per capita agricultural land is around 0.28 Ha. Net irrigated area is 13.4% of net sown area".

=== Bauxite ===
Bauxite is the raw material used to produce aluminium. Lohardaga district has large reserves of world-class bauxite across Pakhar, Hisari, Rudhali Pat, and Khamar Pat, with the mining area extending into neighbouring districts. The district has approval to mine approximately eleven lakh tones of bauxite mineral in a year. Hindalco Industries holds seven of the nine active mining leases in Lohardaga district and supplies bauxite to its aluminium plants in Muri and Renukoot. A ropeway connecting Bagru mines and Lohardaga has been a popular tourist attraction.

== Education ==
As of 2011, Kisko block had 18 villages with pre-primary schools, 47 villages with primary schools, 24 villages with middle schools, five villages with secondary schools, two villages with senior secondary schools, and four villages with no educational facilities.
.*Senior secondary schools are also known as Inter colleges in Jharkhand

== Healthcare ==
As of 2011, Kisko block had two villages with primary health centres, nine villages with primary health subcentres, three villages with maternity and child welfare centres, five villages with allopathic hospitals, three villages with dispensaries, two villages with veterinary hospitals, three villages with family welfare centres, and one village with a medicine shop.
.*Private medical practitioners, alternative medicine etc. not included

== Maoist activities ==
Lohardaga has been identified as a grade "A" district for risk of Naxalite–Maoist insurgency. The Kuru, Bhandra, Kairo, Kisko, Jowang and Senha police stations are considered fully affected, while the Lohardaga police station is considered partially affected. Maoist groups are primarily involved in extorting the bauxite mining and transport industry. Lohardaga Superintendent of Police Ajay Kumar Singh died during anti-insurgency operations.
