= Kisko, Lohardaga =

Kisko
- Village
- Location in Jharkhand, India Kisko (India)
- Coordinates: 23.5184°N 84.6657°E
- Country: India
- State: Jharkhand
- District: Lohardaga

Government
  - Type: Federal democracy

Population (2011)
  - Total: 2,278

Languages *
  - Official: Hindi, Urdu
- Time zone: UTC+5:30 (IST)
- PIN: 835302
- Telephone/ STD code: 06526
- Vehicle registration: JH 08
- Literacy: 84.69%
- Lok Sabha constituency: Lohardaga
- Vidhan Sabha constituency: Loharadaga
- Website: lohardaga.nic.in

Cities, towns and locations in Lohardaga district in South Chotanagpur Division
M: municipality, R: rural/ urban centre, B: Bauxite mining centre
Owing to space constraints in the small map, the actual locations in a larger map may vary slightly

Kisko is a village in the Kisko CD block in the Lohardaga Sadar subdivision of the Lohardaga district in the Indian state of Jharkhand.

== Geography ==
=== Location ===
Kisko is located at 23.5184°N 84.6657°E

=== Area overview ===
The map alongside shows an undulating plateau area with the hilly tract in the west and north-west. Three Bauxite mining centres are marked. It is an overwhelmingly rural district with 87.6% of the population living in the rural areas.

Note: The map alongside presents some of the notable locations in the district. All places marked in the map are linked in the larger full screen map.

== Civic administration ==
=== Police station ===
There is a police station at Kisko.

=== CD block HQ ===
The headquarters of Kisko CD block are located at Kisko village.

== Demographics ==
According to the 2011 Census of India, Kisko had a population of 2,278 (1,260 (55%) males and 1,018 (45%) females). Population in the age range 0–6 years was 351. The number of literate persons in Kisko was 1,632 (84.69% of the population over 6 years).

(*For language details see Kisko block#Language and religion)

== Education ==
Kasturba Gandhi Balika Vidyalaya is a Hindi-medium girls only institution established in 2005. It has facilities for teaching from class VI to class XII. The school has a playground, a library with 2,500 books and has five computers for learning and teaching purposes.

Residential High School Kisko is a Hindi-medium boys only institution established in 1962. It has facilities for teaching from class I to class X. The school has a playground, a library with 3,722 books and has five computers for teaching and learning purposes.

S.S. High School Kisko is a Hindi-medium coeducational institution established in 1974. It has facilities for teaching in classes IX and X. The school has a playground and a library with 600 books.

Project Girls High School Kisko is a Hindi-medium girls only institution established in 1984. It has facilities for teaching from class VII to class X. The school has a playground and a library with 700 books.
