= Kisko (disambiguation) =

Kisko refers to a former municipality of Finland.

It also refers to:

- Kisko block, a community development block in Jharkhand, India
- Kisko, Lohardaga, a village in Jharkhand, India
