= Hisri =

- Village
- Location in Jharkhand, India Hisri (India)
- Coordinates: 23.4514°N 84.6113°E
- Country: India
- State: Jharkhand
- District: Lohardaga

Government
  - Type: Federal democracy

Population (2011)
  - Total: 3,914

Languages *
  - Official: Hindi, Urdu
- Time zone: UTC+5:30 (IST)
- PIN: 835302
- Telephone/ STD code: 06526
- Vehicle registration: JH 08
- Literacy: 62.09%
- Lok Sabha constituency: Lohardaga
- Vidhan Sabha constituency: Loharadaga
- Website: lohardaga.nic.in

Hisri is a village in the Kisko CD block in the Lohardaga Sadar subdivision of the Lohardaga district in the Indian state of Jharkhand.

== Geography ==
Cities, towns and locations in Lohardaga district in South Chotanagpur Division
M: municipality, R: rural/ urban centre, B: Bauxite mining centre
Owing to space constraints in the small map, the actual locations in a larger map may vary slightly

=== Location ===
Hisri is located at 23.4514°N 84.6113°E

=== Area overview ===
The map alongside shows an undulating plateau area with the hilly tract in the west and north-west. Three Bauxite mining centres are marked. It is an overwhelmingly rural district with 87.6% of the population living in the rural areas.

Note: The map alongside presents some of the notable locations in the district. All places marked in the map are linked in the larger full screen map.

== Demographics ==
According to the 2011 Census of India, Hisri had a total population of 3,914, of which 1,962 (50%) were males and 1,952 (50%) were females. Population in the age range 0–6 years was 680. The total number of literate persons in Hisri was 2,008 (62.09% of the population over 6 years).

(*For language details see Kisko block#Language and religion)

== Bauxite mines ==
Lohardaga district has large reserves of world class bauxite across Pakhar, Hisari, Rudhali Pat, Khamar Pat and the mining area also extends to neighbouring districts.

Hindalco is developing a new Bauxte mining project at Hisri.
