= Bhakso Harratoli =

Village in Jharkhand, India

- Village
- Location within Jharkhand Location within India
- Coordinates: 23.4411°N 84.7270°E
- Country: India
- State: Jharkhand
- District: Lohardaga
- Subdistrict: Lohardaga

Bhakso Harratoli is a village in Lohardaga district, Jharkhand, India. In the 2011 Census of India, it was listed in Lohardaga sub-district with location code 363092.
