= Dukha Bhagat =

Indian politician (1953–2021)

Member of Parliament, Lok Sabha
- In office 1999–2004
- Preceded by: Indra Nath Bhagat
- Succeeded by: Rameshwar Oraon
- Constituency: Lohardaga, Jharkhand

Personal details
- Born: 29 April 1953 Irgaon, Lohardaga District, Bihar, India (Presently Jharkhand, India)
- Died: 23 April 2021 (aged 67)
- Party: Bharatiya Janata Party
- Spouse: Savita Bhagat
- Children: 2 sons and 1 daughter

Prof. Dukha Bhagat (29 April 1953 – 23 April 2021) was an Indian politician.

== Biography ==
He was a Member of Parliament, representing Lohardaga, Bihar in the Lok Sabha, the lower house of India's Parliament, as a member of the Bharatiya Janata Party.

Bhagat died from COVID-19 on 23 April 2021, aged 67.
