= B.S. College =

- Type: Undergraduate college
- Established: 1962
- Affiliations: Ranchi University
- Location: Lohardaga, Jharkhand, 835302, India; 23.4185204°N 84.6901047°E
- Campus: Urban
- Website: http://www.bscollegelohardaga.org/

B.S. College, also known as Baldeo Sahu Mahavidyalaya, established in 1962, is one of the oldest general degree college in Lohardaga, Jharkhand. It offers undergraduate courses in arts, commerce and sciences. It is affiliated to Ranchi University.

== Accreditation ==
B.S. College was accredited by the National Assessment and Accreditation Council (NAAC).

== See also ==
- Education in India
- Ranchi University
- Lohardaga
- Literacy in India
- List of institutions of higher education in Jharkhand
