= Juriya =

Village in India

Juriya is a village in the Lohardaga district of Jharkhand state of India. According to the 2011 census, the village had a population of 5398.

== See also ==
- Lohardaga district
