= Indra Nath Bhagat =

Indian politician

Member of Parliament, Lok Sabha
- In office 1998–1999
- Preceded by: Lalit Oraon
- Succeeded by: Dukha Bhagat
- Constituency: Lohardaga, Jharkhand

Personal details
- Born: 6 June 1946 (age 80) Bhakso Harra Toli, Lohardaga District, Bihar, British India (Presently Jharkhand, India)
- Party: Indian National Congress

Indra Nath Bhagat is an Indian politician. He was a Member of Parliament, representing Lohardaga in the Lok Sabha the lower house of India's Parliament as a member of the Indian National Congress.
