= Kamal Kishore Bhagat =

Indian politician

Kamal Kishore Bhagat was an Indian politician and MLA from Lohardaga, Jharkhand (2009–15). He served as working President of All Jharkhand Students Union party. He was convicted and sentenced to seven-year rigorous imprisonment in a 1993 attempt to murder case. He died on 16 December 2021 in a mysterious way.
