= Lalit Oraon =

Indian politician

Lalit Oraon (1935–2003) was a leader of Bharatiya Janata Party from Jharkhand . He was a member of 10th and 11th Lok Sabha elected from Lohardaga.
