= Lawapani Falls =

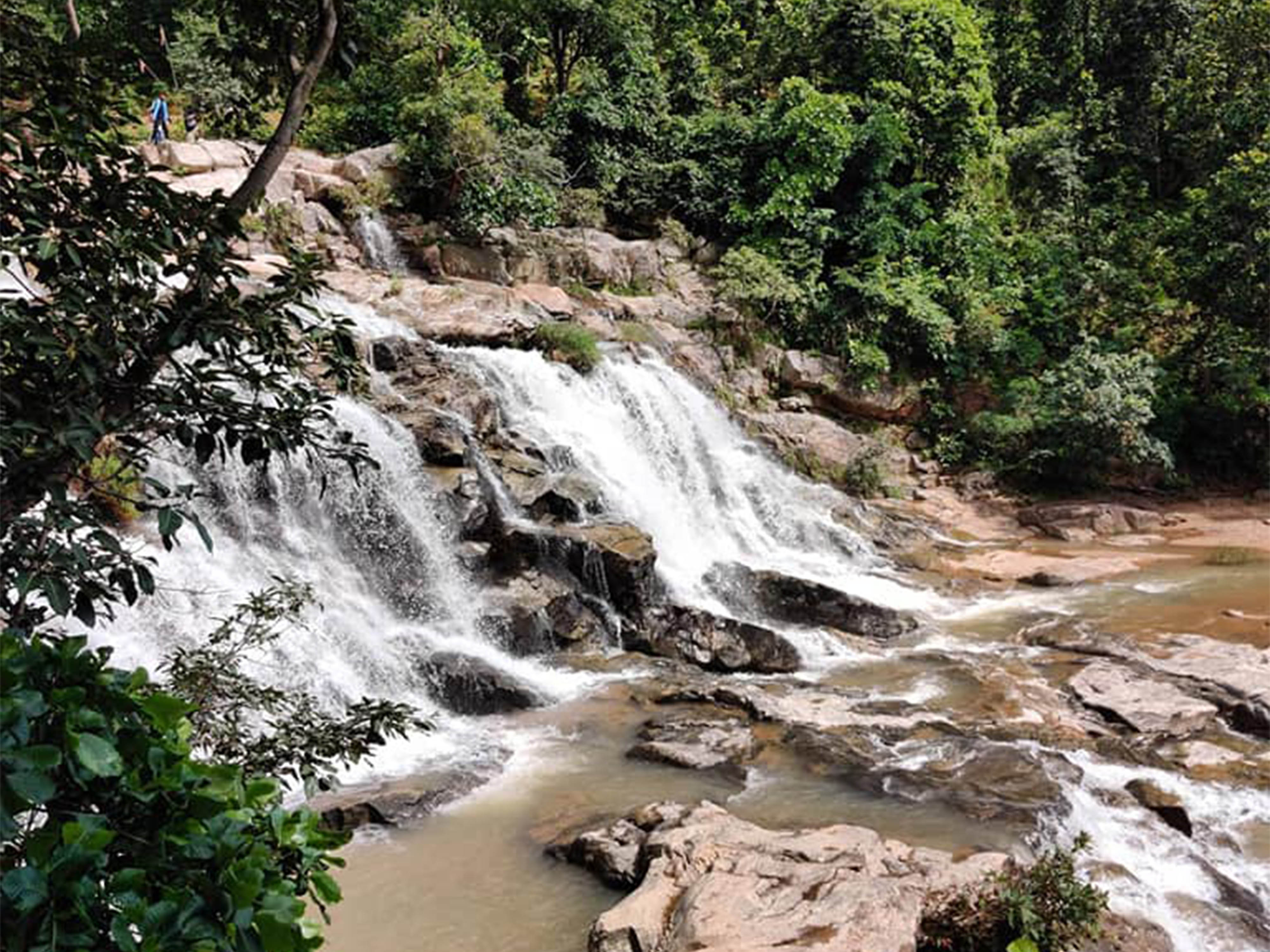

- Location within Jharkhand
- Location: Lohardaga district, Jharkhand, India
- Coordinates: 23°35′50.79″N 84°32′44.16″E
- Type: Tiered
- Total height: 9 metres (30 ft)
- Watercourse: South Koel River

The Lawapani Falls is a waterfall located in Madanpur village of Lohardaga district in the Indian state of Jharkhand.

== See also ==
- List of waterfalls
- List of waterfalls in India
- List of waterfalls in India by height
