= Lohardaga =

- Town
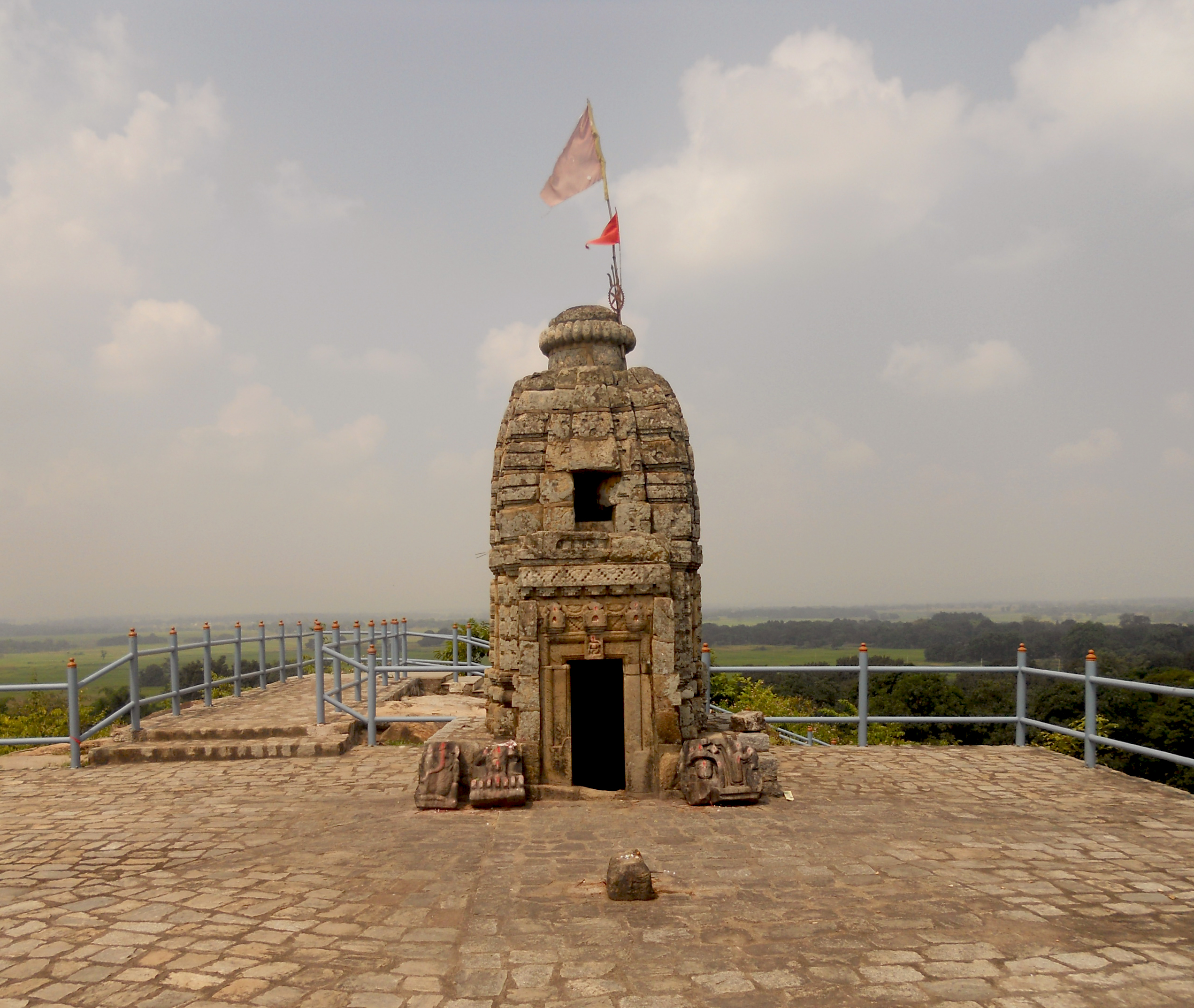
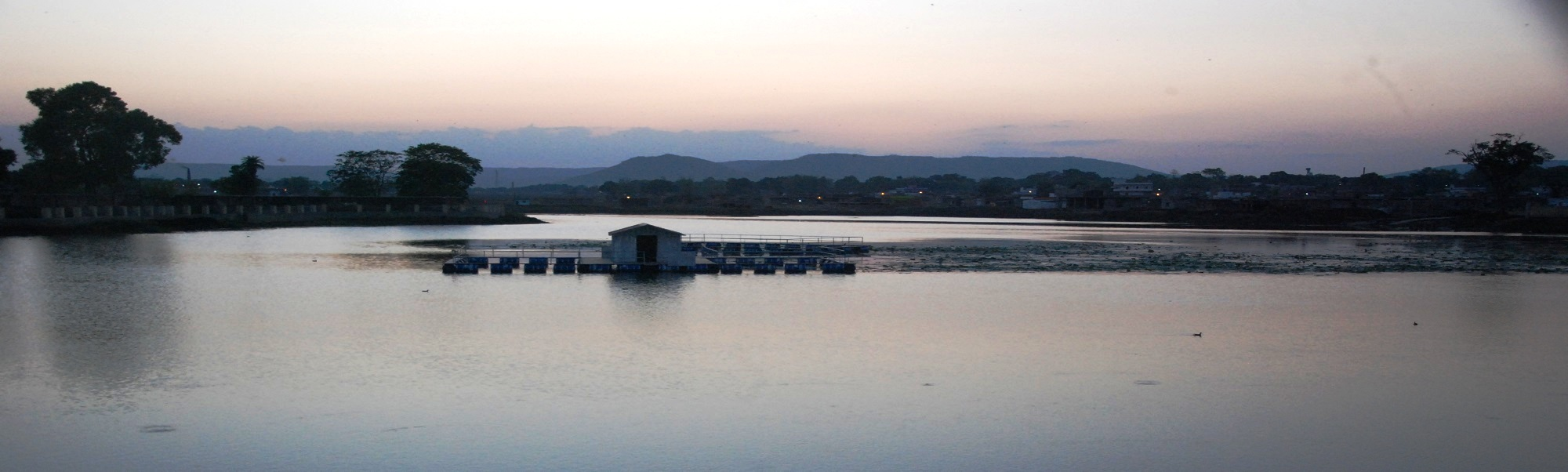
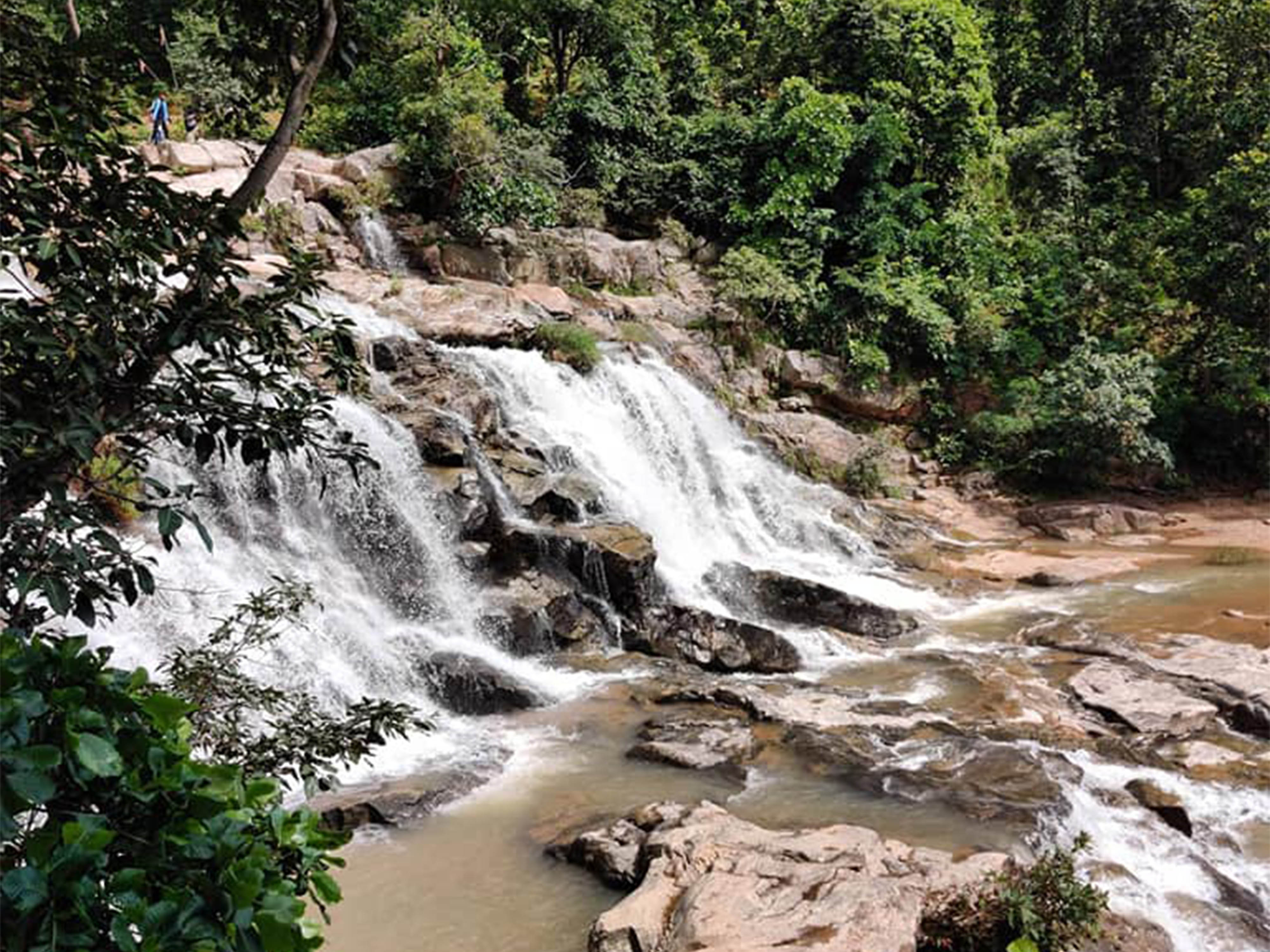
- Top to bottom: The ancient Khakparta Temple, a protected Shiva shrine under ASI, The Victoria Lake, The scenic Lawapani waterfall
- Interactive map of Lohardaga
- Location in Jharkhand, India Lohardaga (India)
- Coordinates: 23.43°N 84.68°E
- Country: India
- State: Jharkhand
- District: Lohardaga
- Elevation: 647 m (2,123 ft)

Population (2011)
  - Total: 57,411

Languages
  - Official: Hindi, Nagpuri
- Time zone: UTC+5:30 (IST)
- PIN: 835302
- Vehicle registration: JH-08
- Website: lohardaga.nic.in

Lohardaga is a town and the district headquarters of Lohardaga district in the Indian state of Jharkhand, west of Ranchi, the state capital. Earlier (early 1900s) Lohardaga was the commissionary headquarters for Chotanagpur. It was only later that the commissionary of Chotanagpur was shifted to Ranchi. The commissioner's office still exists and it houses the Lohardaga Municipality office.

== Geography ==
Cities, towns and locations in Lohadaga district in South Chotanagpur Division
M: municipality, R: rural/ urban centre, B: Bauxite mining centre
Owing to space constraints in the small map, the actual locations in a larger map may vary slightly

=== Location ===
Lohardaga is located at 23.43°N 84.68°E. It has an average elevation of 647 metres (2122 feet).

== Economy ==
Lohardaga is known as the land of bauxite mines. Multiple organizations, especially Hindalco, operate bauxite mines near Lohardaga. Bauxite extracted from the mines around Lohardaga are sent to alumina refineries across various states of India.

== Demographics ==
As of 2011 India census, Lohardaga had a population of 57,411. Males constitute 52% of the population and females 48%. Lohardaga has an average literacy rate of 85.37%, higher than the national average of 59.5%: male literacy is 89.80%, and female literacy is 80.75%. In Lohardaga, 15% of the population is under 6 years of age.

== Politics ==
District	No.	Constituency	Name	Party	Alliance	Remarks	Lohardaga	72	Lohardaga	Rameshwar Oraon

== See also ==
- Lohardaga district
