= Renukoot =

- Town
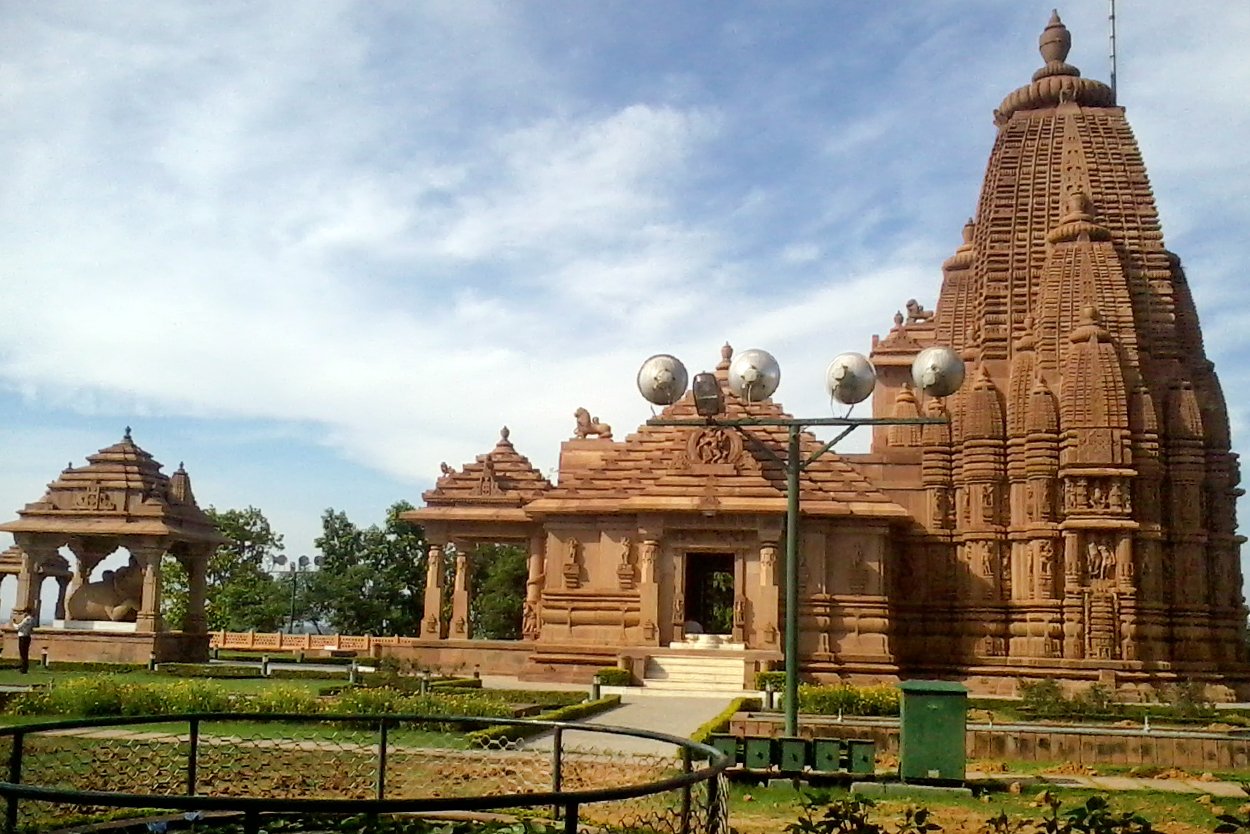
- Nickname: energy/power capital Aluminium City
- Location in Uttar Pradesh, India
- Coordinates: 24.2°N 83.03°E
- Country: India
- State: Uttar Pradesh
- District: Sonbhadra
- Founder: GD Birla
- Named for: Renukeshwar

Government
  - Type: Uttar Pradesh Government
  - Body: Renukoot Nagar Panchayat
- Elevation: 283 m (928 ft)

Population (2012)
  - Total: 68,000

Languages
  - Official: Hindi
- Time zone: UTC+5:30 (IST)
- PIN: 231217
- Telephone code: 05446
- Vehicle registration: UP-64

Renukoot is a town and a nagar panchayat in Sonbhadra district in the Indian state of Uttar Pradesh. It is 68 km south from the district headquarters Robertsganj.

Renukoot is well known for the Hindalco aluminium plant and Rihand Dam. It is situated in eastern Uttar Pradesh and shares borders with the states of Chhattisgarh, Jharkhand, Bihar and Madhya Pradesh. It is about 434 km from the capital city Lucknow.

== Geography ==
Renukoot is located at 24.2°N 83.03°E. It has an average elevation of 283 metres (931 feet). Renukoot lies in the southeast-most part of Uttar Pradesh and sits next to Shakti Nagar, Anpara, Dalla and Obra. Renukoot is in Sonebhadra district which is the only district in India which borders four states, namely Madhya Pradesh, Chhattisgarh, Jharkhand, and Bihar.

Rihand Dam, located 6 km from Renukoot, was built over Govind Ballabh Pant Sagar Lake and the Rihand River (a tributary of the Son River). This dam was created in 1960 and was inaugurated by then prime minister of India Jawarharlal Nehru.

== Demographics ==
As of the 2011 India census, Renukoot had a population of over 78,000. Males constituted 57% of the population and females 43%. Renukoot had an average literacy rate of 83%, higher than the national average of 72%; male literacy is 92%, and female literacy is 77%. 14% of the population was under 6 years of age.

== History ==
When former Indian Prime Minister Pt. Jawaharlal Nehru came for the inauguration of Rihand Dam, G.D. Birla and J.R.D Tata accompanied him. Nehru asked them to set up an industry here. G.D. Birla agreed and set up Hindalco Industries Limited in 1963. Pt.Nehru asked GD Birla to develop it as a mini Switzerland of India. This was the foundation of Renukoot. Renukoot used to be in Mirzapur district which was later split up into Sonebhadra and Mirzapur. Renukoot falls into the Sonebhadra district now. The area of Vindhyachal near the north-western part of the area are also known for many religious hills and historic caves and temples. The Chunar Fort, dating 50 BC, is on the way to Varanasi from Renukoot, less than five hours drive.

== Education ==
Renukoot has five major English medium high schools, and four of them follow the CBSE board they are Nirmala Convent Senior Secondary School, Aditya Birla Public School previously known as Hindalco Vidya Niketan, Bhavan's K.D.K. Vidya Mandir and D.C.Lewis Memorial School follows ICSE. Renukoot also has two schools where the medium of education is Hindi and which follow the Uttar Pradesh Board standards - Aditya Birla Intermediate College previously known as Hindalco Intermediate College, Maharishi Dayanand Inter College, GIC Pipri. Renukoot is now accelerating in Higher Education and has a Degree college named Babu Ram Singh Post Graduate Degree College, situated at Khadpaathar. There are many big universities within four to five hours distance, including Banaras Hindu University and Allahabad University. Recently, Renukoot has begun developing new colleges to impart higher education within the township.
