= Lohardaga district =

Administrative district in Jharkhand, India

Coordinates: 23°26′N 84°41′E

- District of Jharkhand
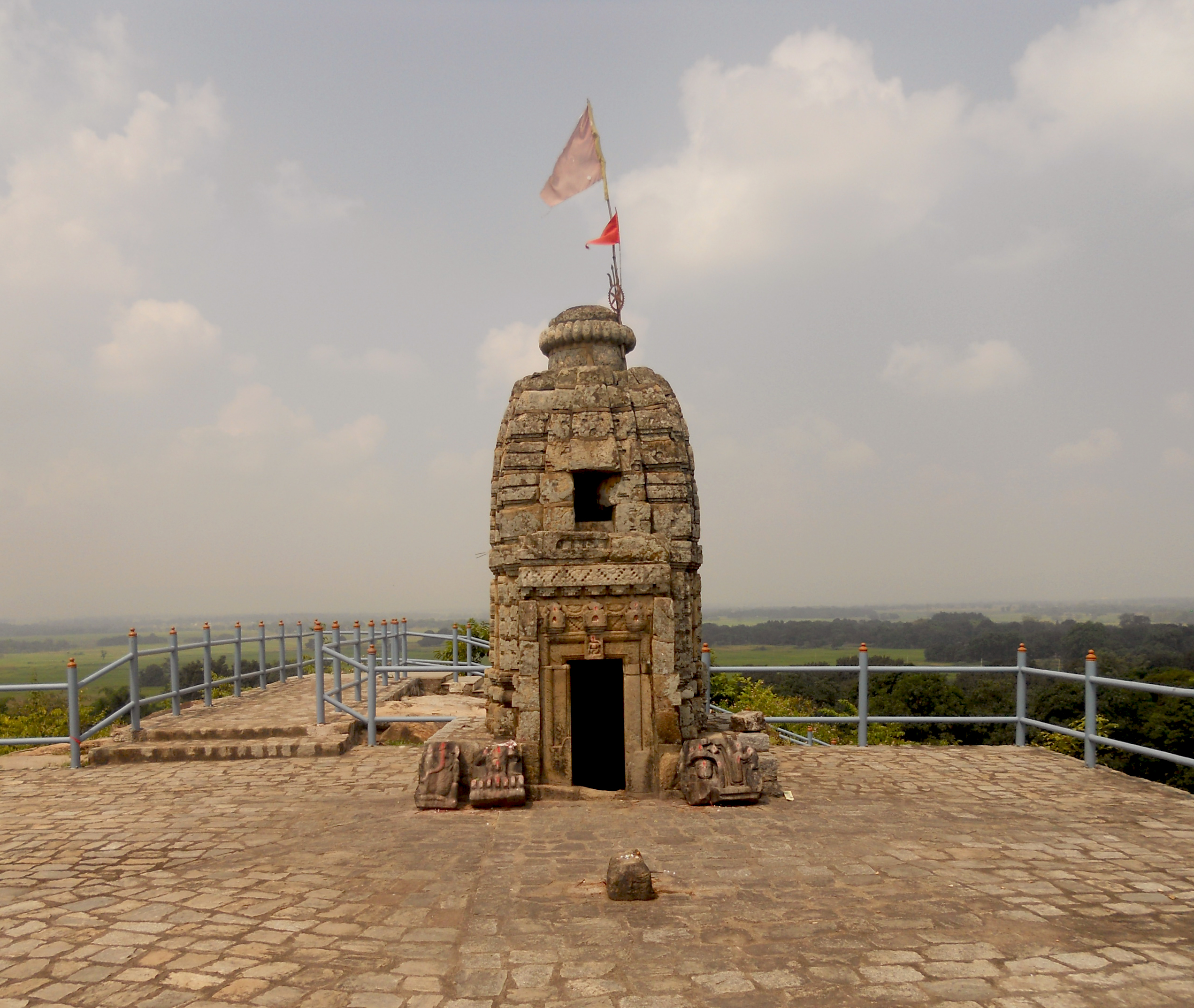
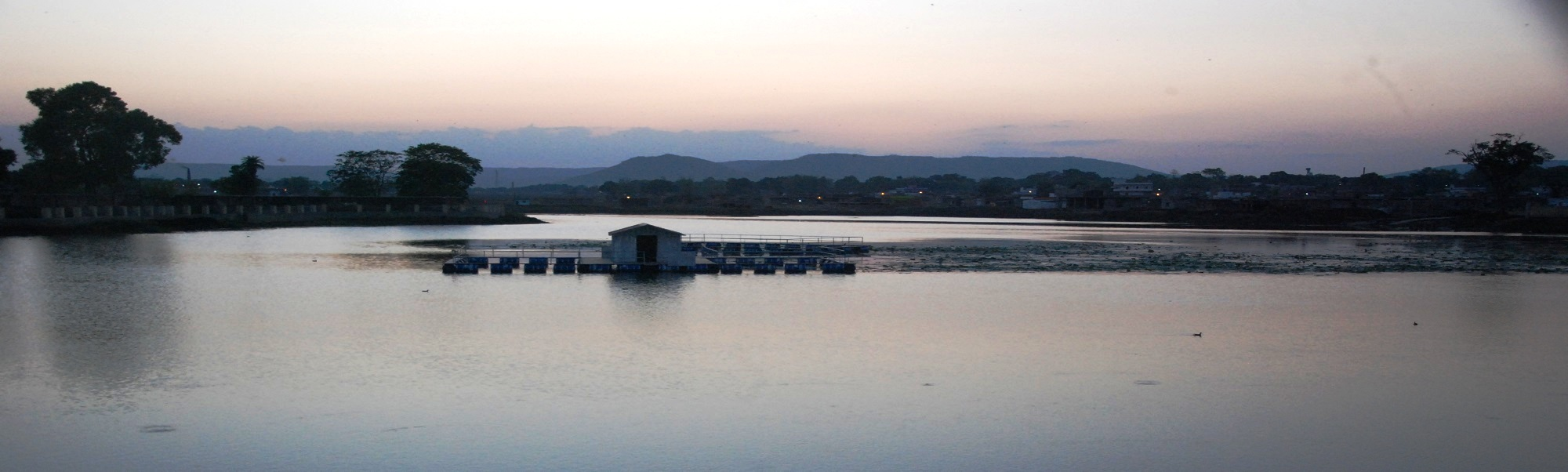
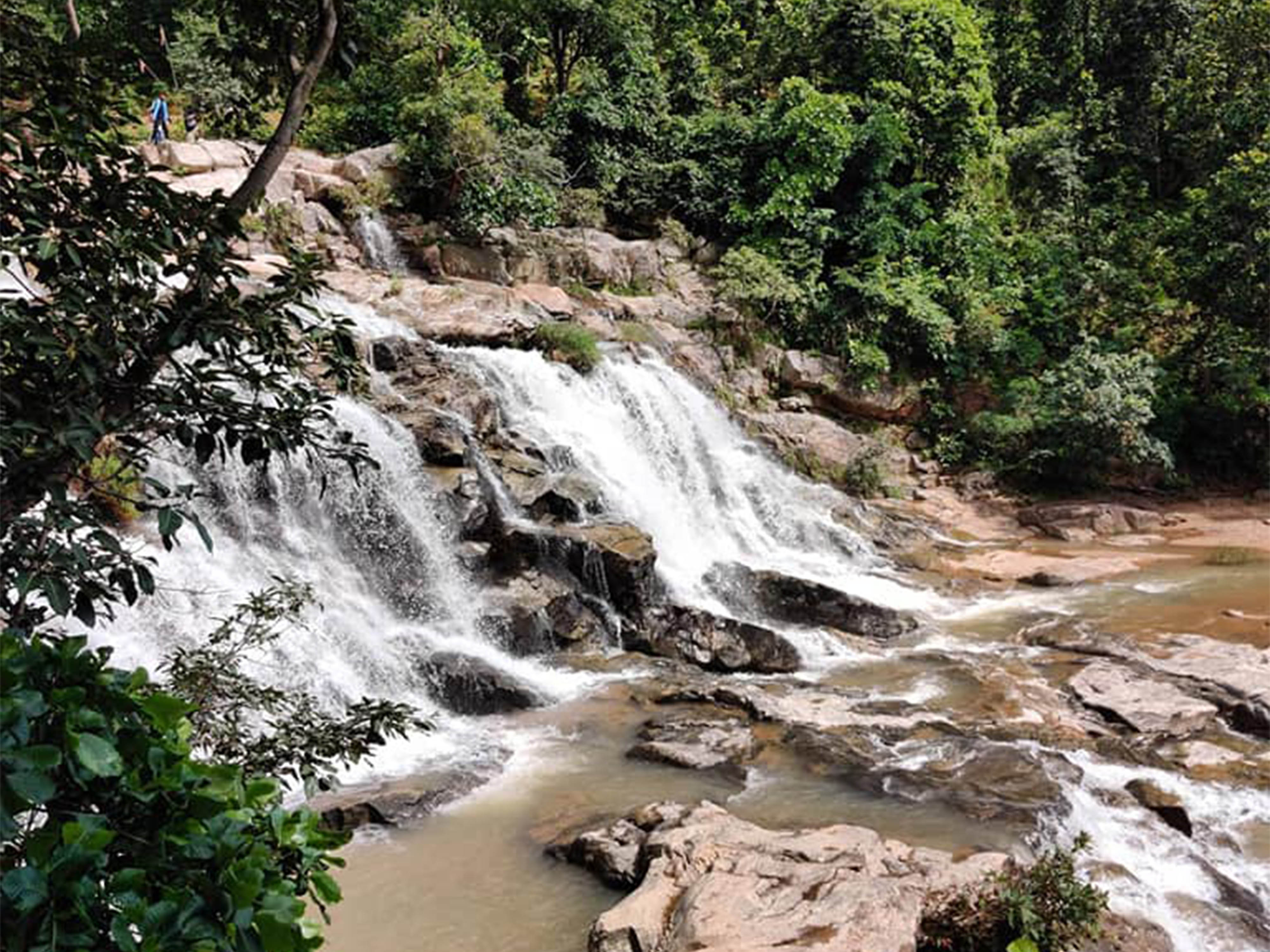
- Top to bottom: Khakparta Temple, a protected Shiva shrine under ASI, Victoria Lake, Lawapani waterfall
- Interactive map of Lohardaga district
- Country: India
- State: Jharkhand
- Division: South Chotanagpur
- Headquarters: Lohardaga

Government
  - Deputy Commissioner: Dr Waghmare Prasad Krishna (IAS)
  - Lok Sabha constituencies: Lohardaga (shared with Gumla district)
  - Vidhan Sabha constituencies: 1

Area
  - Total: 1,502 km^{2} (580 sq mi)

Population (2011)
  - Total: 461,790
  - Density: 307.5/km^{2} (796.3/sq mi)

Demographics
  - Literacy: 68.29%
  - Sex ratio: 985
- Time zone: UTC+05:30 (IST)
- Website: lohardaga.nic.in

Lohardaga district is one of the twenty-four districts of the Indian state of Jharkhand. The district is named after the town of Lohardaga, the administrative headquarters of the district. The district was created from a portion of Ranchi district in 1983.

This district is surrounded by Latehar district in the north, Gumla district in south and west and Ranchi district in the east. The district is situated between 23°30' and 23°40' north latitudes and 84°40' and 84°50' east longitudes. The district covers an area of 1,502 km^{2}.

As of 2011, it is the least populous district of Jharkhand (out of 24).

It is currently a part of the Red Corridor.

== History ==
The current district map of Jharkhand shows the yellow and green-shaded districts that were part of Lohardaga district until 1892, when the yellow-shaded region became Palamu district and the green-shaded region became Ranchi district. In subsequent years, other districts were carved out from these two districts.

Lohardaga was the largest district in the Chota Nagpur Division of the Bengal Presidency, covering 12,044 square miles (31,190 km^{2}) southwest areas of present-day Jharkhand. In 1892, it was bifurcated into the Palamu and Ranchi districts. By 1901, Ranchi covered 7,128 square miles (18,460 km^{2}) and Palamu 4,914 square miles (12,730 km^{2}), with the Lohardaga area remaining part of Ranchi. Post-independence, with an area of 1,502 km^{2}, the Lohardaga region was reestablished as a district in 1983, following the bifurcation of Ranchi into three districts: Ranchi, Lohardaga, and Gumla. In 2007, the Khunti subdivision was carved out from Ranchi district to form a separate district.

== Geography ==
District has a number of small hill blocks covered with forests. The general slope of the district is from west to east. Latehar district is situated in the north of this district, Ranchi district in the east and Gumla district in the south-west.

Lohardaga district consists of two broad physiographic divisions – the hilly tract and the plateau region. The hilly tract extends over the western and north-western parts of the district. The high hill tops of this region are known as pat. The plateau region is a part of the Gumla Plateau; which lies in the southern portion of Chota Nagpur Plateau. Lohardaga and Bhandra CD blocks are entirely in the plateau region. Other administrative areas, such as Kisko, Senha and Kuru CD blocks are partly in the plateau region and partly in the hilly tract.

The main rivers of the district are South Koel, Sankh, Nandni, Chaupat’s and Fulijhar etc. These are mainly rain fed rivers which dry up in the summer months. Some springs are also seen in the hilly tract of the district. Geologically the area in comprised with Archean Granites and Gneisses. In the uplands considerable thickness of late-rite of Pleistocene age is found in the Granite and Gneisses tracts. Alluvium of recent to sub-recent age is found in the river valleys. The major part of the district is covered with Golden Alluvium, Red and Sandy and Red and Gravelly soils. Laterite and Red and Yellow soils are also found elsewhere in the district.

The most important mineral of the district is bauxite. Other minerals which are found in the district are feldspar, fire clay and china clay and have less economic importance.

The district enjoys a healthy and pleasant climate throughout the year. The annual average temperature is 23 °C and the district receives an annual average rainfall of 1000–1200 mm.

== Administration ==
Lohardaga district consists of 7 blocks. The following are the list of the blocks in Lohardaga district:

1. Bhandra block
2. Kisko block
3. Lohardaga block
4. Senha block
5. Kuru block
6. Kairo block
7. Peshrar block

== Demographics ==
Historical population
Year	Pop.	±%
1901	95,816	—
1911	111,925	+16.8%
1921	107,681	−3.8%
1931	126,456	+17.4%
1941	135,192	+6.9%
1951	150,184	+11.1%
1961	172,363	+14.8%
1971	201,422	+16.9%
1981	229,786	+14.1%
1991	288,886	+25.7%
2001	364,521	+26.2%
2011	461,790	+26.7%
Source: Census of India

According to the 2011 census, Lohardaga district has a population of 461,790, roughly equal to the nation of Suriname. This gives it a ranking of 549th in India (out of a total of 640). The district has a population density of 307 inhabitants per square kilometre (800/sq mi). Its population growth rate over the decade 2001-2011 was 26.67%. Lohardaga has a sex ratio of 985 females for every 1000 males, and a literacy rate of 67.61%. 12.43% of the population lives in urban areas. Scheduled Castes and Scheduled Tribes make up 3.32% and 56.89% of the population respectively.

=== Religion ===
Religion in Lohardaga district (2011)
Religion	Percent
ORP	51.10%
Hinduism	24.19%
Islam	20.57%
Christianity	3.63%
Other or not stated	0.35%
*ORP mostly adherents of Sarnaism

In the district tribal religion (mainly Sarna) are practiced by half (i.e. 51.10%) of the population. While Hindus constitute 24.34%, Islam 20.57% and Christianity 3.63% of the population.

=== Languages ===
Languages of Lohardaga district (2011)
1. Kurukh (39.0%)
2. Sadri (33.2%)
3. Urdu (13.9%)
4. Hindi (12.5%)
5. Others (1.50%)

At the time of the 2011 Census of India, 38.96% of the population in the district spoke Kurukh, 33.17% Sadri, 13.87% Urdu and 12.50% Hindi as their first language.

Other languages spoken here includes Asuri, a Munda language spoken by approximately 17,000 people.

== Economy ==
The net sown area is only 55% of the total area of the district. Two blocks i.e. Kisko and Senha have large area under dense forest cover. The forest cover is around 32-35% of the total area of the district. The average land holding per household is 1.65 Ha. The per capita agriculture land is around 0.28 Ha. Net irrigated area is 13.4% of net sown area (0.8% by canals, 7% by wells, 2% by tanks & 3.6% by lift irrigation and others).

In 2006 the Indian government named Lohardaga one of the country's 250 most backward districts (out of a total of 640). It is one of the 21 districts in Jharkhand currently receiving funds from the Backward Regions Grant Fund Programme (BRGF).

== Education ==
There are 318 primary schools, 68 middle schools, 20 High schools, 2 higher secondary schools, and two degree colleges and one degree college for girls in the district.

== Healthcare ==
In this district, there is a district hospital, one referral hospital, five primary health sub-centres, ten additional primary health centres, seventy three health sub-centres.

== Politics ==
District	No.	Constituency	Name	Party	Alliance	Remarks	Lohardaga	72	Lohardaga	Rameshwar Oraon

== See also ==
- Bhakso Harratoli
- Lohardaga
- Latehar district
- Gumla district
- Ranchi district
- Chatra district
