= Lohardaga Lok Sabha constituency =

Lok Sabha Constituency in Jharkhand

Coordinates: 23.4°N 84.7°E

Lohardaga JH-12
- Lok Sabha constituency
- Interactive Map Outlining Lohardaga Lok Sabha constituency

Constituency details
- Country: India
- Region: East India
- State: Jharkhand
- Assembly constituencies: Mandar; Sisai; Gumla; Bishunpur; Lohardaga
- Established: 1957
- Reservation: ST

Member of Parliament
- 18th Lok Sabha
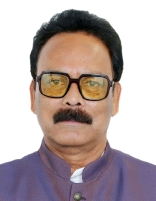
- Incumbent Sukhdeo Bhagat
- Party: INC
- Alliance: INDIA
- Elected year: 2024
- Preceded by: Sudarshan Bhagat

Lohardaga Lok Sabha constituency is one of the 14 Lok Sabha (parliamentary) constituencies in Jharkhand state in eastern India. Presently this constituency is reserved for the candidates belonging to the Scheduled tribes. This constituency covers the entire Gumla and Lohardaga districts and part of Ranchi district.

== Assembly segments ==
Presently, Lohardaga Lok Sabha constituency comprises the following five Vidhan Sabha (legislative assembly) segments:

| # | Name | District | Member | Party | 2024 Lead |
|---|---|---|---|---|---|
| 66 | Mandar (ST) | Ranchi | Shilpi Neha Tirkey | INC | INC |
| 67 | Sisai (ST) | Gumla | Jiga Susaran Horo | JMM | INC |
| 68 | Gumla (ST) | Gumla | Bhushan Tirkey | JMM | INC |
| 69 | Bishunpur (ST) | Gumla | Chamra Linda | JMM | INC |
| 72 | Lohardaga (ST) | Lohardaga | Rameshwar Oraon | INC | INC |

== Members of Parliament ==
| Year | Member | Party |
|---|---|---|
| 1957 | Ignace Beck | Jharkhand Party |
| 1962 | David Munzni | Swatantra Party |
| 1967 | Kartik Oraon | Indian National Congress |
| 1971 | Kartik Oraon | Indian National Congress |
| 1977 | Laloo Oraon | Janata Party |
| 1980 | Kartik Oraon | Indian National Congress (I) |
| 1984 | Sumati Oraon | Indian National Congress |
| 1989 | Sumati Oraon | Indian National Congress |
| 1991 | Lalit Oraon | Bharatiya Janata Party |
| 1996 | Lalit Oraon | Bharatiya Janata Party |
| 1998 | Indra Nath Bhagat | Indian National Congress |
| 1999 | Dukha Bhagat | Bharatiya Janata Party |
| 2004 | Rameshwar Oraon | Indian National Congress |
| 2009 | Sudarshan Bhagat | Bharatiya Janata Party |
| 2014 | Sudarshan Bhagat | Bharatiya Janata Party |
| 2019 | Sudarshan Bhagat | Bharatiya Janata Party |
| 2024 | Sukhdeo Bhagat | Indian National Congress |

== Election results ==
=== General election 2024 ===
2024 Indian general election: Lohardaga
| Party | Candidate | Votes | % | ±% |
|---|---|---|---|---|
| INC | Sukhdeo Bhagat | 483,038 | 49.95 | ▲5.78 |
| BJP | Samir Oraon | 3,43,900 | 35.56 | ▼9.89 |
| Independent | Chamra Linda | 45,998 | 4.76 | New |
| CPI | Mahendra Urav | 16,793 | 1.13 | New |
| NOTA | None of the above | 11,384 | 1.18 | |
| Majority | | 1,39,138 | | |
| Turnout | | 9,71,662 | 67.09 | |
| INC gain from BJP | | Swing | | |

=== 2019 ===
2019 Indian general elections: Lohardaga
| Party | Candidate | Votes | % | ±% |
|---|---|---|---|---|
| BJP | Sudarshan Bhagat | 371,595 | 45.45 | −5.27 |
| INC | Sukhdeo Bhagat | 3,61,232 | 44.18 | −5.09 |
| Jharkhand Party | Deokumar Dhan | 19,546 | +2.39 | |
| Independent | Sanjay Oraon | 10,663 | +1.3 | |
| AITC | Dinesh Oraon | 9,643 | 1.18 | −16.99 |
| Majority | | 10,363 | +1.27 | |
| Turnout | | 8,18,367 | 66.30 | |
| BJP hold | | Swing | | |

=== 2014 ===
2014 Indian general elections: Lohardaga
| Party | Candidate | Votes | % | ±% |
|---|---|---|---|---|
| BJP | Sudarshan Bhagat | 2,26,666 | 34.79 | |
| INC | Rameshwar Oraon | 2,20,177 | 33.80 | |
| AITC | Chamra Linda | 1,18,355 | 18.17 | |
| Majority | | 6,489 | 1.00 | |
| Turnout | | 6,51,639 | 58.23 | |
| BJP hold | | Swing | | |

=== 2009 ===
2009 Indian general elections: Lohardaga
| Party | Candidate | Votes | % | ±% |
|---|---|---|---|---|
| BJP | Sudarshan Bhagat | 1,44,628 | 27.58 | |
| Independent | Chamra Linda | 1,36,345 | 26.00 | |
| INC | Rameshwar Oraon | 1,29,622 | 24.72 | |
| Majority | | 8,283 | 1.59 | |
| Turnout | | 5,24,402 | 53.42 | |
| BJP gain from INC | | Swing | | |

== See also ==
- Lohardaga district
- Gumla district
- List of constituencies of the Lok Sabha
