= Lohardaga Assembly constituency =

Constituency of the Jharkhand legislative assembly in India

Coordinates: 23.44°N 84.68°E

Lohardaga
- Constituency No. 72 for the Jharkhand Legislative Assembly

Constituency details
- Country: India
- Region: East India
- State: Jharkhand
- District: Lohardaga district
- Lok Sabha constituency: Lohardaga
- Established: 2000
- Reservation: None

Member of Legislative Assembly
- 6th Jharkhand Legislative Assembly
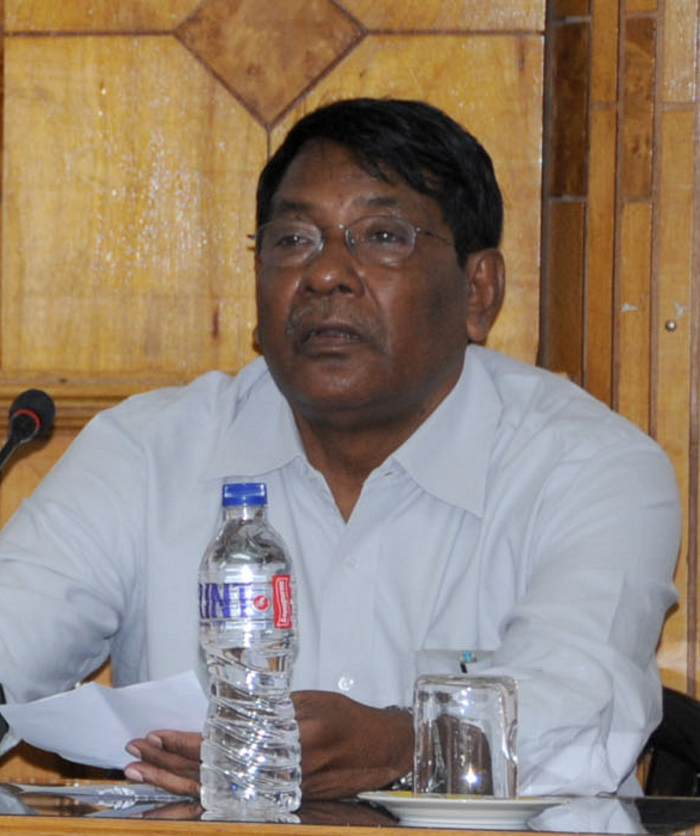
- Incumbent Rameshwar Oraon
- Party: INC
- Alliance: MGB
- Elected year: 2024

Lohardaga is an assembly constituency in the Indian state of Jharkhand.

== Members of the Legislative Assembly ==
Election	Name	Party
Bihar Legislative Assembly
1952	Ignes Kujur	Jharkhand Party
1957	Pritam Kujur	Jharkhand Party
1962	Sushil Bakhla	Swatantra Party
1967	Bihari Lakra	Indian National Congress
1969	Bihari Lakra	Indian National Congress
1972	Bihari Lakra	Indian National Congress
1977	Indra Nath Bhagat	Indian National Congress
1980	Indra Nath Bhagat	Indian National Congress
1985	Indra Nath Bhagat	Indian National Congress
1990	Indra Nath Bhagat	Indian National Congress
1995	Sadhanu Bhagat	Bharatiya Janata Party
2000	Sadhanu Bhagat	Bharatiya Janata Party
Jharkhand Legislative Assembly
2005	Sukhdeo Bhagat	Indian National Congress
2009	Kamal Kishore Bhagat	All Jharkhand Students Union
2014	Kamal Kishore Bhagat	All Jharkhand Students Union
2015^	Sukhdeo Bhagat	Indian National Congress
2019	Rameshwar Oraon	Indian National Congress
2024	Rameshwar Oraon	Indian National Congress

^by-election

== Election results ==
=== Assembly election 2024 ===
2024 Jharkhand Legislative Assembly election: Lohardaga
Party	Candidate	Votes	%	±%
INC	Rameshwar Oraon	113,507	53.06	▲10.38
AJSU	Neru Shanti Bhagat	78,837	36.85	▲13.95
Independent	Rameshwar Lohra	4,010	1.87	New
BAP	Avdhesh Oraon	3,159	1.48	New
Independent	Saniya Oraon	2,602	1.22	New
JPP	Anil Kumar Bhagat	1,453	0.68	New
BSP	Yashpal Bhagat	1,354	0.63	New
NOTA	None of the Above	908	0.42	▼1.18
Margin of victory		34,670	16.21	▼1.09
Turnout		2,13,940	74.35	▲3.36
Registered electors		2,87,746		▲17.19
INC hold		Swing	▲10.38	

=== Assembly election 2019 ===
2019 Jharkhand Legislative Assembly election: Lohardaga
Party	Candidate	Votes	%	±%
INC	Rameshwar Oraon	74,380	42.67	▼7.77
BJP	Sukhdeo Bhagat	44,230	25.37	New
AJSU	Neru Shanti Bhagat	39,916	22.90	New
Bhartiya Tribal Party	Sadhnu Bhagat	4,318	2.48	New
JVM(P)	Pawan Tigga	1,661	0.95	▼10.62
JD(U)	Dipak Oraon	1,384	0.79	New
Independent	Ekus Dhan	1,360	0.78	New
NOTA	None of the Above	2,799	1.61	▲0.23
Margin of victory		30,150	17.30	▲1.39
Turnout		1,74,312	70.99	▲4.55
Registered electors		2,45,547		▲11.42
INC hold		Swing	▼7.77	

=== Assembly by-election 2015 ===
2015 Jharkhand Legislative Assembly by-election: Lohardaga
Party	Candidate	Votes	%	±%
INC	Sukhdeo Bhagat	73,859	50.44	▲12.03
AJSU	Niru Shanti Bhagat	50,571	34.54	New
JVM(P)	Bandu Tirkey	16,951	11.58	▲8.76
CPI	Ajmel Oraon	1,529	1.04	New
Independent	Ranjit Oraon	859	0.59	New
Independent	Biglal Oraon	831	0.57	New
NOTA	Nota	2,019	1.38	New
Margin of victory		23,288	15.90	▲15.50
Turnout		1,46,430	67.36	▼1.31
Registered electors		2,20,386		▲1.81
INC gain from AJSU		Swing	▲11.63	

=== Assembly election 2014 ===
2014 Jharkhand Legislative Assembly election: Lohardaga
Party	Candidate	Votes	%	±%
AJSU	Kamal Kishore Bhagat	56,920	38.81	▲8.09
INC	Sukhdeo Bhagat	56,328	38.41	▲8.20
JMM	Sukhdeo Oraon	13,510	9.21	New
JVM(P)	Anita Minz	4,123	2.81	New
Independent	Rameshwar Oraon	2,423	1.65	New
BSP	Sunil Kujur	2,372	1.62	▲0.27
Independent	Shishir Toppo	1,687	1.15	New
NOTA	None of the Above	1,858	1.27	New
Margin of victory		592	0.40	▼0.12
Turnout		1,46,660	67.75	▲8.76
Registered electors		2,16,477		▲9.55
AJSU hold		Swing	▲8.09	

=== Assembly election 2009 ===
2009 Jharkhand Legislative Assembly election: Lohardaga
Party	Candidate	Votes	%	±%
AJSU	Kamal Kishore Bhagat	35,816	30.72	▲26.48
INC	Sukhdeo Bhagat	35,210	30.20	▲6.17
BJP	Sadhnu Bhagat	28,949	24.83	▲4.31
Independent	Pawan Ekka	3,632	3.12	New
CPI(ML)L	Aashamani Devi	2,238	1.92	New
RDP	Sura Oraon	1,632	1.40	New
BSP	Balmukund Lohra	1,571	1.35	New
Margin of victory		606	0.52	▼4.13
Turnout		1,16,575	58.99	▲7.72
Registered electors		1,97,610		▼30.48
AJSU gain from INC		Swing	▲6.69	

=== Assembly election 2005 ===
2005 Jharkhand Legislative Assembly election: Lohardaga
Party	Candidate	Votes	%	±%
INC	Sukhdeo Bhagat	35,023	24.03	▼9.42
BJP	Sadhnu Bhagat	28,243	20.52	▼14.68
Independent	Karma Oraon	12,158	8.83	New
Independent	Pawan Ekka	9,674	7.03	New
AJSU	Kamal Kishore Bhagat	5,845	4.25	New
RJD	Jokhan Bhagat	3,963	2.88	▼19.64
Independent	Sukhdeo Lohra	2,356	1.71	New
Margin of victory		6,780	4.65	▲2.89
Turnout		1,45,746	51.27	▲18.83
Registered electors		2,84,246		▲91.22
INC gain from BJP		Swing	▼11.17	

=== Assembly election 2000 ===
2000 Bihar Legislative Assembly election: Lohardaga
Party	Candidate	Votes	%	±%
BJP	Sadhanu Bhagat	16,979	35.20	New
INC	Indra Nath Bhagat	16,131	33.45	New
RJD	Pawan Ekka	10,863	22.52	New
Independent	Pinju Bhagat	1,168	2.42	New
Independent	Basudeo Oraon	971	2.01	New
Communist Party of India (Marxist Leninist) Liberation	Jagdip Oraon	873	1.81	New
BSP	Shivdeo Bhagat	595	1.23	New
Margin of victory		848	1.76	
Turnout		48,229	33.00	
Registered electors		1,48,651		
BJP win (new seat)				

== See also ==
- Vidhan Sabha
- List of states of India by type of legislature
