= Tatanagar–Bilaspur section =

Railway line in India

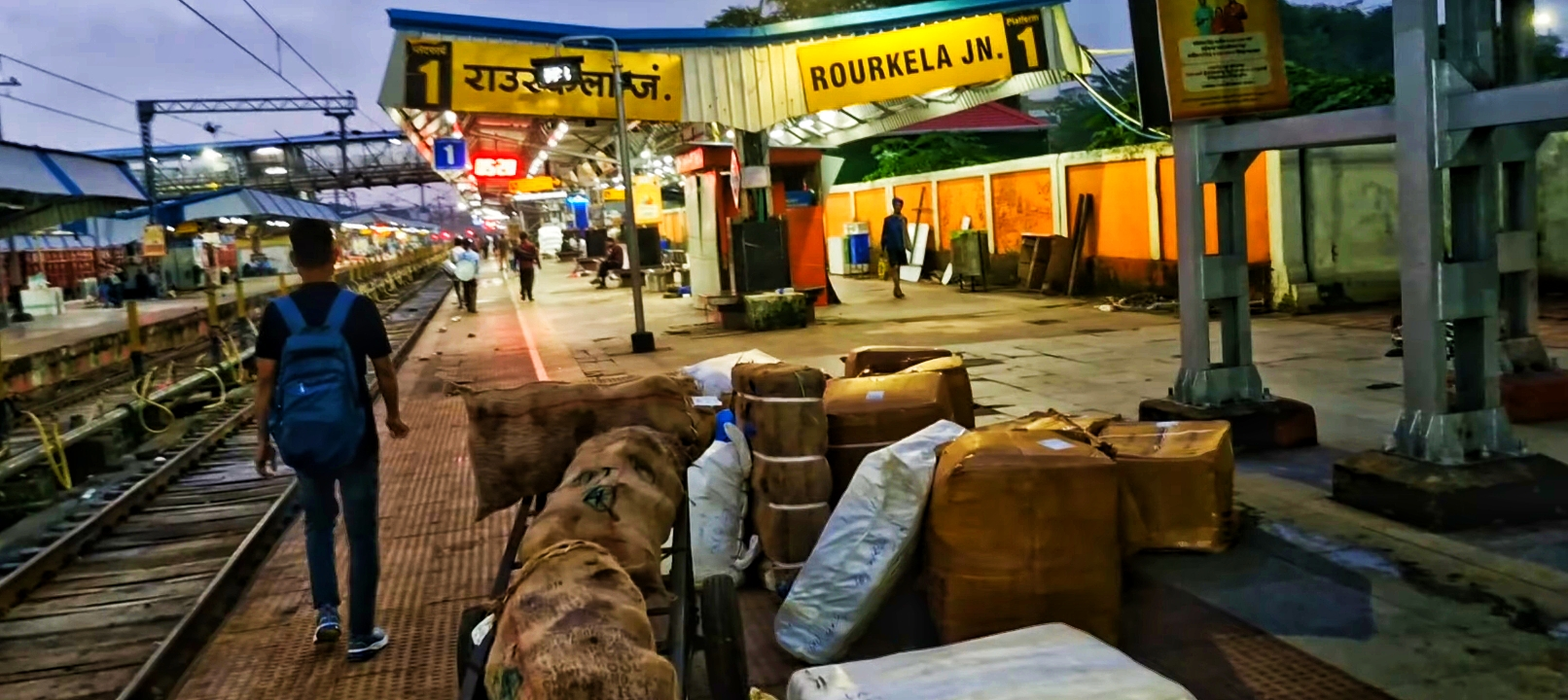
- Rourkela Junction an important Railway Station on Tatanagar–Bilaspur section

Overview
- Status: Operational
- Owner: Indian Railways
- Locale: Jharkhand, Odisha, Chhattisgarh
- Termini: Tatanagar; Bilaspur

Service
- System: Electrified
- Operator(s): South Eastern Railway, South East Central Railway, East Coast Railway

Technical
- Track length: Main line: 468 km (291 mi); Branch lines: Champa–Gevra Road: 50 km (31 mi); Bondamunda–Barsuan: 70 km (43 mi); Rajkharswan–Gua: 106 km (66 mi); Padapahar–Jakhapura: 224 km (139 mi)
- Track gauge: 5 ft 6 in (1,676 mm) broad gauge
- Electrification: Yes

The Tatanagar–Bilaspur section is part of the Howrah–Nagpur–Mumbai line and connects Tatanagar in the Indian state of Jharkhand and Bilaspur in Chhattisgarh. Part of one of the major trunk lines in the country, it passes through an industrial-mining area and handles high volumes of freight, particularly coal and iron ore.

== Geography ==
The Tatanagar–Bilaspur section of Howrah–Nagpur–Mumbai line passes through the Saranda forest on the Chota Nagpur Plateau in southern Jharkhand. The area through which it passes includes portions of northern Odisha and northern Chhattisgarh, with topography similar to that of the Chota Nagpur Plateau. It is generally forested area amidst hills alternating with valleys. The major rivers flowing through the area are: Subarnarekha, Kharkai, South Karo, South Koel, Sankh, Brahmani, Ib, Mand and Hasdeo. While the eastern portion of this line connects to iron ore mines spread on both sides of the Jharkhand–Odisha border, the western portion caters to the Ib Valley Coalfield in Odisha and the Korba Coalfield in Chhattisgarh. There are three steel plants in the area: the Jamshedpur Works of Tata Steel, Rourkela Steel Plant of SAIL and Jindal Steel and Power at Raigarh. Bharat Aluminium Company has its plant at Korba. There are several engineering units on this line, as for example Tata Motors at Jamshedpur, Tata Growth Shop and Tayo Rolls at Adityapur, and Larsen & Toubro at Kansbahal. The line extends support to numerous cement plants, power plants, refractory units, ferro alloy plants and a paper mill.

Kalinganagar is an upcoming industrial hub in Odisha.

== History ==
The Howrah–Allahabad–Mumbai line, a joint effort of Great Indian Peninsula Railway and East Indian Railway Company came up in 1870. The Bengal Nagpur Railway was formed in 1887 for the purpose of upgrading the Nagpur Chhattisgarh Railway and then extending it via Bilaspur to Asansol, in order to develop a shorter Howrah–Mumbai route than the one via Allahabad. The Bengal Nagpur Railway main line from Nagpur to Asansol, on the Howrah–Delhi main line, was opened for goods traffic on 1 February 1891.

One of the last hurdles for the track was construction of the Saranda Tunnel. It was completed on 1 October 1892. The tunnel pierces the narrow divide between the Subarnarekha and the Brahmani basins.

The 50.70 km (32 mi) long 5 ft 6 in (1,676 mm) broad gauge Champa–Korba–Gevra Road branch line was constructed between 1953 and 1956.

=== Railway reorganization ===
The Bengal Nagpur Railway was nationalized in 1944.Eastern Railway was formed on 14 April 1952 with the portion of East Indian Railway Company east of Mughalsarai and the Bengal Nagpur Railway. In 1955, South Eastern Railway was carved out of Eastern Railway. It comprised lines mostly operated by BNR earlier. Amongst the new zones started in April 2003 were East Coast Railway and South East Central Railway. Both these railways were carved out of South Eastern Railway.

=== Jurisdiction ===
The mainline from Tatanagar to Jharsuguda, and all branch lines within this portion except Juruli–Jakhapura section are within the jurisdiction of Chakradharpur railway division of South Eastern Railway. The Ib–Bilaspur section of the mainline is under the jurisdiction of Bilaspur railway division of South East Central Railway. Juruli–Jakhapura section is under the jurisdiction of East Coast railway.

=== Movement of steel plant raw materials ===
Frontline paid rich tributes to Bengal Nagpur Railway/South Eastern Railway:

"As it expanded its network at a rapid pace to help in the exploitation of the rich mineral resources in the region. New lines were laid and connections made to facilitate the movement of iron ore to the new steel plants – TISCO and IISCO at Tatanagar and Burnpur respectively. To tap the coal reserves in Jharia, a 115-mile-long (185 km) line connecting Midnapore with Bhojudih was set up in 1903 and extended to Gomoh in 1907. In 1922, the Talcher coalfields were linked by a rail line taking off from Nergundi on the East Coast. The Raipur-Vizianagaram link was completed in 1931, connecting the East Coast with the Central Province. Following these developments, the BNR Company owned the largest narrow gauge network in the country… "As independent India embarked on a policy of rapid industrialisation, the SER took upon the task of moving raw materials by constructing new lines from plants to the mine heads at Dallhirajra, Ahiwara, Barsuan, Kiriburu and Meghataburu. Doubling of sections and progressive electrification were taken up along with the setting up of marshalling yards and exchange yards to meet the demands of the steel sector."

== Electrification ==
The entire line is electrified but that came in stages. The Purulia–Chakradharpur, Kandra–Gomharria, Sini–Adityapur, Adityapur–Tatanagar, Chakradharpur–Manoharpur and Manoharpur–Rourkela sections were electrified in 1961–62. The Rourkela–Jharsuguda, Jharsuguda–Raigarh and Raigarh–Bilaspur sections were electrified in 1969–70.

Amongst the branch lines the Rajkharsawan–Dangoaposi section was electrified in 1960–61. It was extended to Noamundi in 1965–66. The Padapahar–Deojhar and Noamundi–Barajamda sections were electrified in 1966–67, and the same year electrification was extended to Gua and Bolanikhadan. The branch line between Rajkharswan and Dongoaposi was amongst the first routes on the Indian Railways to be electrified with 25 kV-AC traction.

The Bondamunda–Lathikata and Lathikata–Chandiposh sections were electrified in 1996–97 and electrification was extended to Bimalagarh in 1997–1998. It was further extended to Barsuan and Rangra the same year.

The Rourkela–Biramitrapur section was electrified in 1964–65.

The Champa–Korba section was electrified in 1987–88 and electrification was extended to Gevra Road in 1988–89.

== Passenger movement ==
Tatanagar, Rourkela and Bilaspur on this line are amongst the top hundred booking stations of Indian Railway.

== Freight traffic ==
=== Iron ore ===
Iron ore is the second largest commodity moved by the railways in India, accounting for 16% of total freight traffic. (Coal is number one with a 43% share). 116 million tonnes of iron ore was moved in 2006–07 which included 38.84 million tonnes of iron ore for export.

In 2010–11 South-East Railway earned Rs 8,187 crore in freight charges, of which Rs 5,135 crore was from iron ore transportation. Apart from domestic consumption, iron ore from the mines in Odisha and Jharkhand is exported through Haldia, Visakhapatnam, Paradeep and Gangavaram ports.

Bengal Iron and Steel Co. started iron mining at Pansiraburu in their Duia mines in 1901. Initially the iron ore was transported over hilly terrain and through thick forests in bullock carts to the nearest rail head at Manoharpur. The ore was consumed in the Kulti Works, which then produced iron. In 1910, the Manoharpur Light Railway was built from Manoharpur to the foot of Pansira Buru. It was extended to Chiria in 1916. A 64 km (40 mi) branch line from Tatanagar to Gorumahisani (on the Asansol–Tatanagar–Kharagpur line) was opened to traffic in 1911 mainly for transportation of iron ore. The Rajkharswan–Dongoaposi line was opened in 1924 and extended to Gua in 1925, primarily to transport iron ore and manganese ore for IISCO Steel Plant at Burnpur. In 1936, the Manoharpur Light Railway owned 34 locomotives, 5 railcars and 360 goods wagons.

Tata Steel started the iron mines at Noamundi in 1925 and that has been the major source of its iron ore for many years. It has also been getting iron ore from its Joda mines for around half a century. The 28.05 km (17 mi) long 5 ft 6 in (1,676 mm) broad gauge Noamundi–Banspani line was constructed between 1956 and 1958.

The Jhakpura–Daitari line was opened for traffic in 1977 and the Banspani–Tomka line was added in 1998.

Rourkela was connected to Barsuan iron ore mines (the township is Tensa) in 1960 and the line was extended to Kiriburu in 1963.

Barsuan, commissioned in 1960, Kiriburu, commissioned in 1964, Meghahatuburu, commissioned in 1985, and Bolani, commissioned in 1960, are iron ore mines on this track administered by the Raw Materials Division of Steel Authority of India. Numerous private operators are engaged in iron ore mining, quite often for exports.

Construction of the line between Jakhapura, on the Howrah–Chennai line, and Daitari was sanctioned in 1976–77. It was commissioned in 1981. The 152 km-long (94 mi) Daitari–Banspani line was sanctioned in 1992–93 to facilitate transportation of iron ore for export through Paradip Port. The Banspani–Kendujhar section was operational in 2004. The Kendujhar–Tomka section was operational in 2007. Passenger trains started plying on this route in 2009.

=== Coal ===
The Gevra mine of the Korba Coalfield, the largest open cast mine in Asia, is served by the Champa–Gevra Road branch line. As of 2011 Gevra mine had a capacity of 35 million tonnes per annum and along with Dipka and Kusmunda mine the area had a total annual capacity of 70 million tonnes.

The 2010 production level of the Ib Valley Coalfield, served by this line, was 38 million tonnes but was expected to rise sharply over the years.

The Mand Raigarh Coalfield does not have a rail link (as of 2012). Construction of the 180 km-long (112 mi) Bhupdeopur–Korichhapar/Baroud–Dharamjaygarh with an extension up to the Champa–Korba branch line is essential for the transportation of around 100 million tonnes of coal planned annually from Mand Raigarh Coalfield. South Eastern Coalfields Limited will fund this project. Construction of the 52 km (32 mi) long Jharsuguda–Barpalli rail line is essential for transportation of coal from the Ib Valley Coalfield with a potential of 90 million tonnes per annum. Mahanadi Coalfields Limited will fund this project.

South East Central Railway, the railway zone handling coal transportation mentioned above, is the largest freight-loading zonal railway in India. It handled a revenue-earning freight traffic of 150.7 million tonnes in 2011–12 and the coal throughput was 112.5 million tonnes (against 104.4 million tonnes in the previous financial year).

== Speed limits ==
The entire Howrah–Nagpur–Mumbai line is classified as a "Group A" line which can take speeds up to 130 km/h. The Rajakharshwan–Dongoaposi–Padapahar–Barajamda–Gua, Bondamunda–Bimlagarh–Barsuan–Kiriburu, Kandra–Gamharria, Champa–Gevra Road and Padapahar–Banspani branch lines are classified as "Group E Special" lines where traffic density is very high or likely to grow substantially in future and the present sanctioned speed is less than 100 km/h.

== New line surveys ==
New line surveys of Indian Railway to be taken up during 2012–13 in this section include Champa–Abhimanpur bypass line, Bilaspur–Dongargarh via Uslapur Mungeli, Korba–Ranchi, Renukoot–Korba via Ambikapur Katghora, Bilaspur–Gatora–Dipka–Katghora, Pendra–Gevra Road via Katghora, Banspani–Barbil, Banspani–Barsuan.

== New railway station project ==
Shifting of Banspani station to Joda Town. Amid a growing demand for shifting of Banspani railway station to Joda Town of Keonjhar district of Odisha, a delegation from the railways visited the area Thursday 10 May 2019.

Banspani is considered an important railway station of Joda Mining Sector of Odisha, under South Eastern railway in terms of freight services. Daily, lakhs of tonnes of minerals are transported from this station to various parts of the country. Even passengers trains operate to various major destinations like Kacheguda(Hyderabad), Visakhapattanam, Bhubaneswar, Tatanagar, Rourkela. But distance between town and the station is creating issue due to improper distance, and pollution.

A delegation of the railways led by top officials like SK Singh, GK Sahu took stock of the area from Banspani to Bachu Hutting on 10/05/2019.

"If the railway station is shifted to Joda town, passengers will feel it easy, and it can be a major station of this region in future." they added.

Head of the delegation SK Singh said that technical aspect of the proposal is being checked and a report will be submitted to the higher authorities soon.
