= List of rivers of Jharkhand =

The list of rivers of Jharkhand state, located in Eastern India.

== Rivers ==
- Ajay River
- Amanat River
- Auranga River
- Baitarani River
- Bakreshwar River
- Bansloi River
- Barakar River
- Bokaro River
- Brahmani River
- Burha River
- Damodar River
- Deo River
- Dwarka River
- Ganges
- Hinglo River
- Jamunia River
- Kangsabati River
- Kanhar River
- Kaunhara ghat
- Kharkai River
- Kiul River
- Koina River
- Konar River
- Lilajan River
- Mayurakshi River
- Mohana River
- North Karo River
- North Koel River
- Punpun River
- Sankh River
- Sone River
- South Karo River
- South Koel River
- Subarnarekha River
- Telen River
