= List of rivers of Odisha =

The list of rivers of Odisha state, located in Eastern India.

They are tributaries to the Bay of Bengal of the Indian Ocean.

== Rivers ==
- Baitarani River
- Bhargavi River
- Bhede River
- Brahmani River
- Budhabalanga River
- Budha-baitarani River
- Chitroptala river
- Daya River
- Devi River
- Dhamra River
- Ib River
- Kadua River
- Kansabansa River
- Kathajodi River
- Kharkai River
- Kharsrota River
- Koina River
- Kuakhai River
- Kushabhadra River
- Mahanadi
- Malaguni River
- Nagavali River
- Ong River
- River Kolab
- Rushikulya
- Sabari River
- Sankh River
- Sileru River
- South Karo River
- South Koel River
- Subarnarekha River
- Surubalijora
- Tel River
- Telen River
- Vaitarani River
- Vamsadhara River
- Bahuda River
