= Gour (caste) =

Social group of Jharkhand, India

Gour or Goud is a caste of Jharkhand similar to Gopal (caste) of Odisha. Locally they are also known as Ahir, Gour Gowala. Most of them speak the local form of Odia language which they label as Singhbhumi Odia.

== Subdivisions ==
The Gour is divided into four endogamous subdivisions that are Krishna Goud, Nanda Goud, Jharia Goud, and Magadha Goud. They are found in the river basin of Subarnarekha. Their society divided into both totemic and non totemic based lineage that are Nag (Serpent), Kachim (Tortoise), Sal (a fish), Jam Jhodia, Chara (a bird), Bar Behera, Bhaisa, Hathi, Hanumat, Kutar, Kudranosa, Palai and Rout. They use Gop, Gope, Gour, Dandapat, Pradhan, Majhi, Barik, Bera, Giri, Saw, Patra and Behera as surnames.

== History ==
The Gour are one of the earliest settlers of Singhbhum district Jharkhand. Traditionally they worked with livestock in a semi-nomadic way of life. As well as they were good warriors. In the matter of fact, the Gour fought with the Kurmi with the help of Kol (Ho) and Munda during their settlement in the river basin of Sankhya, Koel and Karo. After winning the war they placed a landmark stone pillar at Hatnabeda village, adjoining to Kotgarh, near the Saranda forest.

The staple food of Gours is Marh Bhat (rice with boiled water) and Pakhal Bhat (rice with cold water) and sessional vegetable. They are non vegetarian thus consume egg, fish, meat ( goat, deer, sheep, borha and others except beef). They also consume Hanria (rice beer), Mod ( wine from Mahua flower).

The Gours of Kolhan region are in the social cluster of Ho tribe. And they are classified as Backward Classes in 1980 after representation submitted by Singhbhum Gour Kalyan Samiti to the erstwhile Government of Bihar.
