= Koel River =

Koel River may refer to the following two rivers in Jharkhand, India:

- South Koel River, a tributary of the Brahmani River
- North Koel River, a tributary of the Son River
