= Bedani =

Coordinates: 22°14′N 76°26′E

Bedani Bedani Kalan Bedani Kalan on Map
- Village
- Interactive map of Bedani
- Country: India
- State: Jharkhand
- District: Palamau
- Founder: Gouri Baba

Languages
  - Official: Hindi, Santali, Bhojpurii, Magahi
- Time zone: UTC+5:30 (IST)
- Postal code: 822118
- Vehicle registration: JH
- Coastline: 0 kilometres (0 mi)

Bedani (also known as Bedani Kalan) is a small village located in Tarhasi Block of Palamu District in the state of Jharkhand, India). It lies on the banks of the Amanat River some 30 km from the District town of Medininagar (Daltonganj)

== Etymology ==
According to a local legend, the village was established in 17th century CE, during the period of a sage called Gauri Ram Baba. The legend states that once a king's marriage party stopped at the site to rest during the course of their journey. Gauri Baba was passing by that place. Seeing the marriage party, he told the king about the probability of a Lightning Strike and asked them to move away from the place. As soon as the king's party moved away, the place was struck by lightning. The king was impressed by Gauri Baba and gifted him the site, along with 12 other villages in the vicinity. As a result, the village was named "bardani", Hindi for "received in gift". Over time, the name became "Bedani".

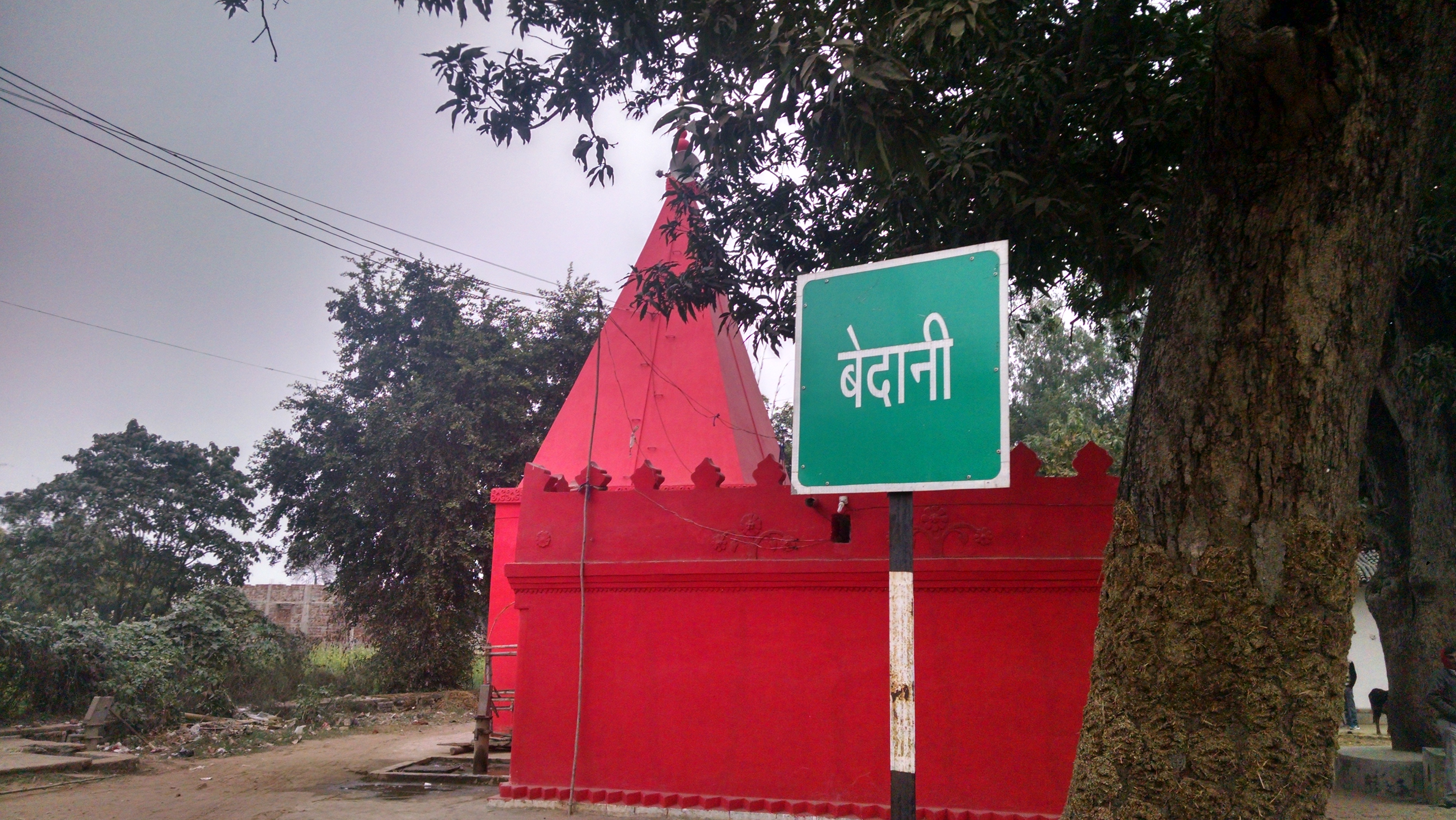

== Infrastructure and places to visit ==
Bedani has basic facilities like schools, primary healthcare centre, temples and markets. A large number of villagers moved out of the village in search of better job opportunities and higher education.

- Bedani Mandir

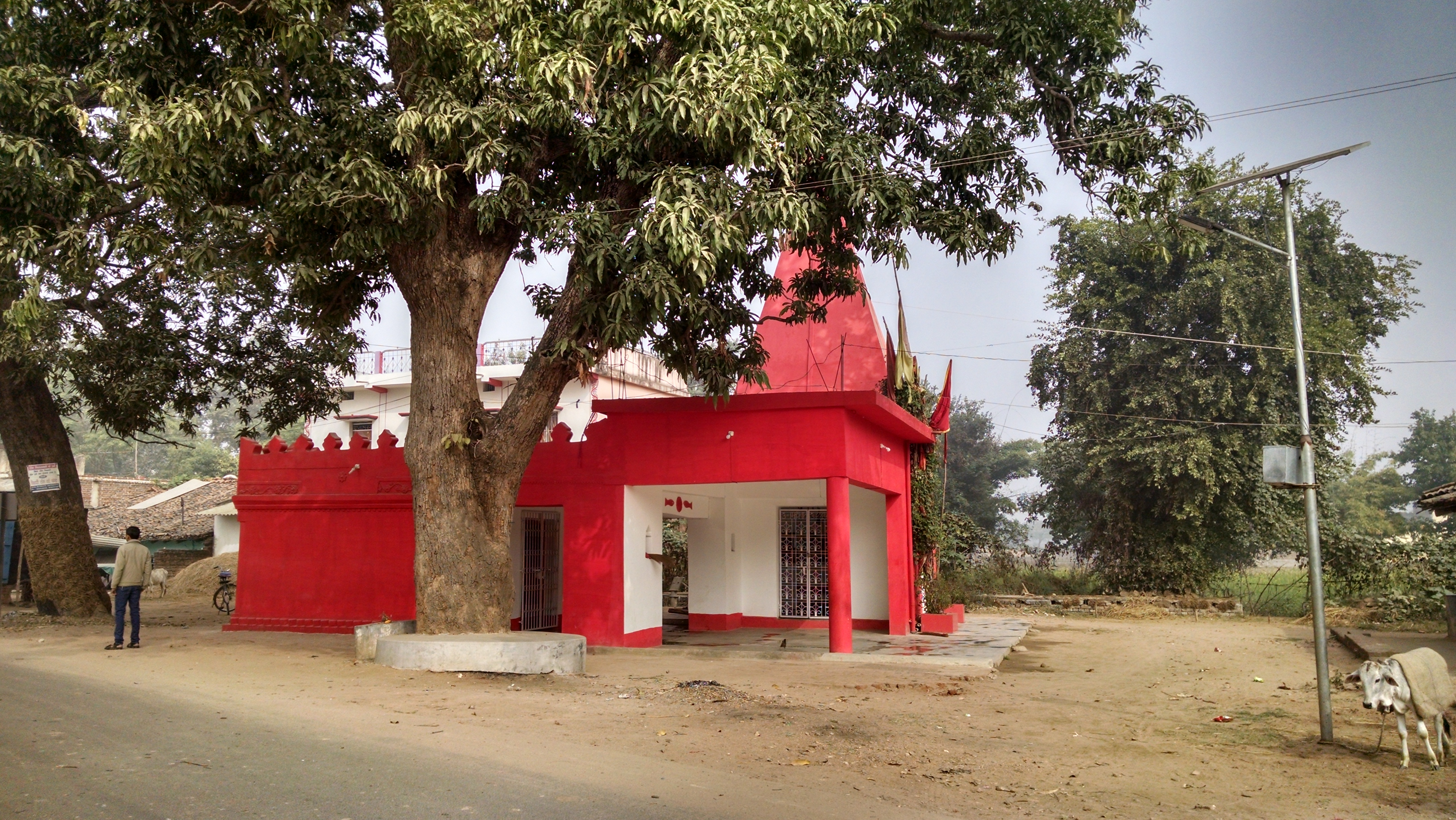

- Tarhasi Mandir

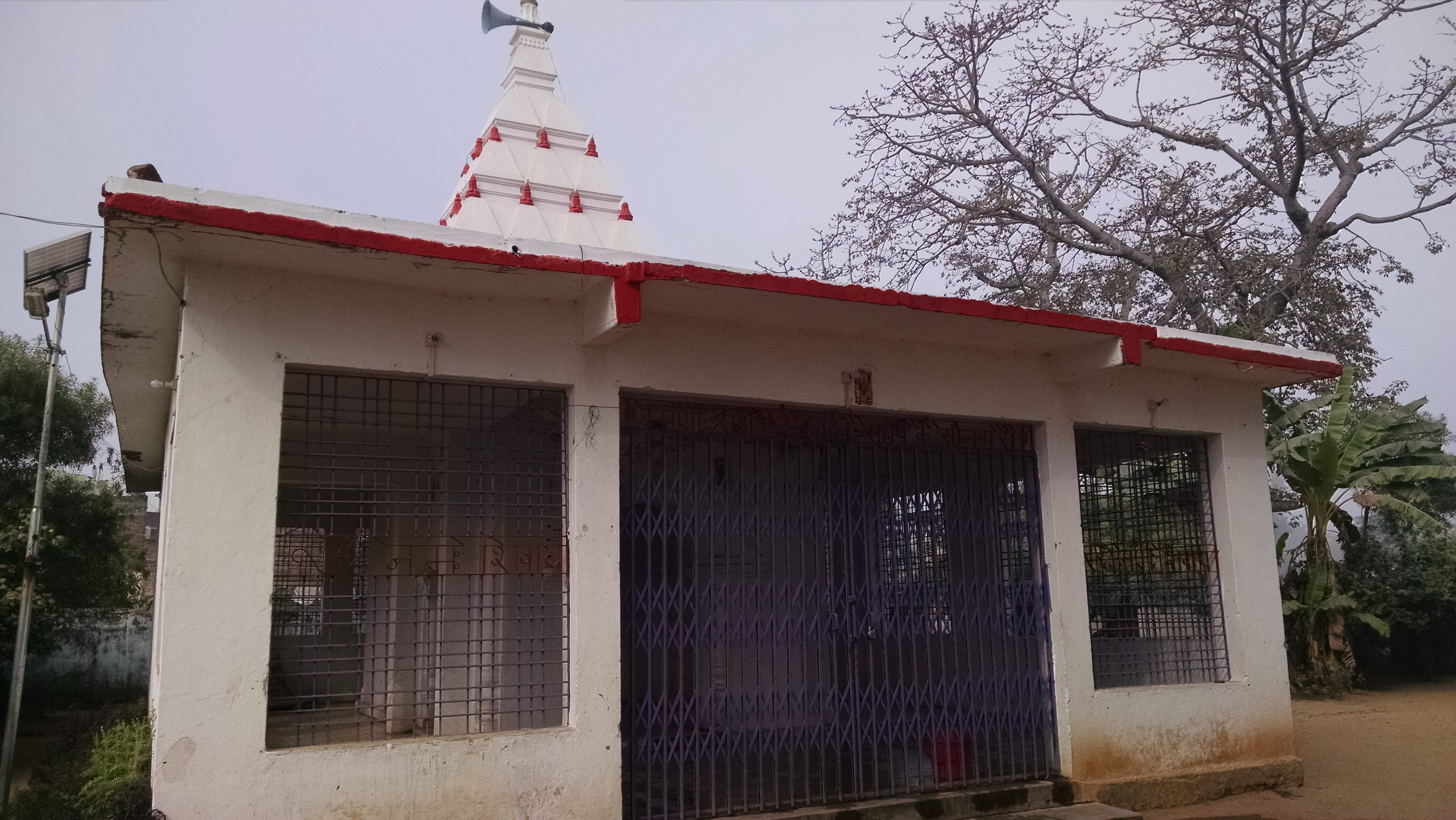

- Tarhasi Bazaar Mandir
- Sati Mata Mandir, Bajari Bagi

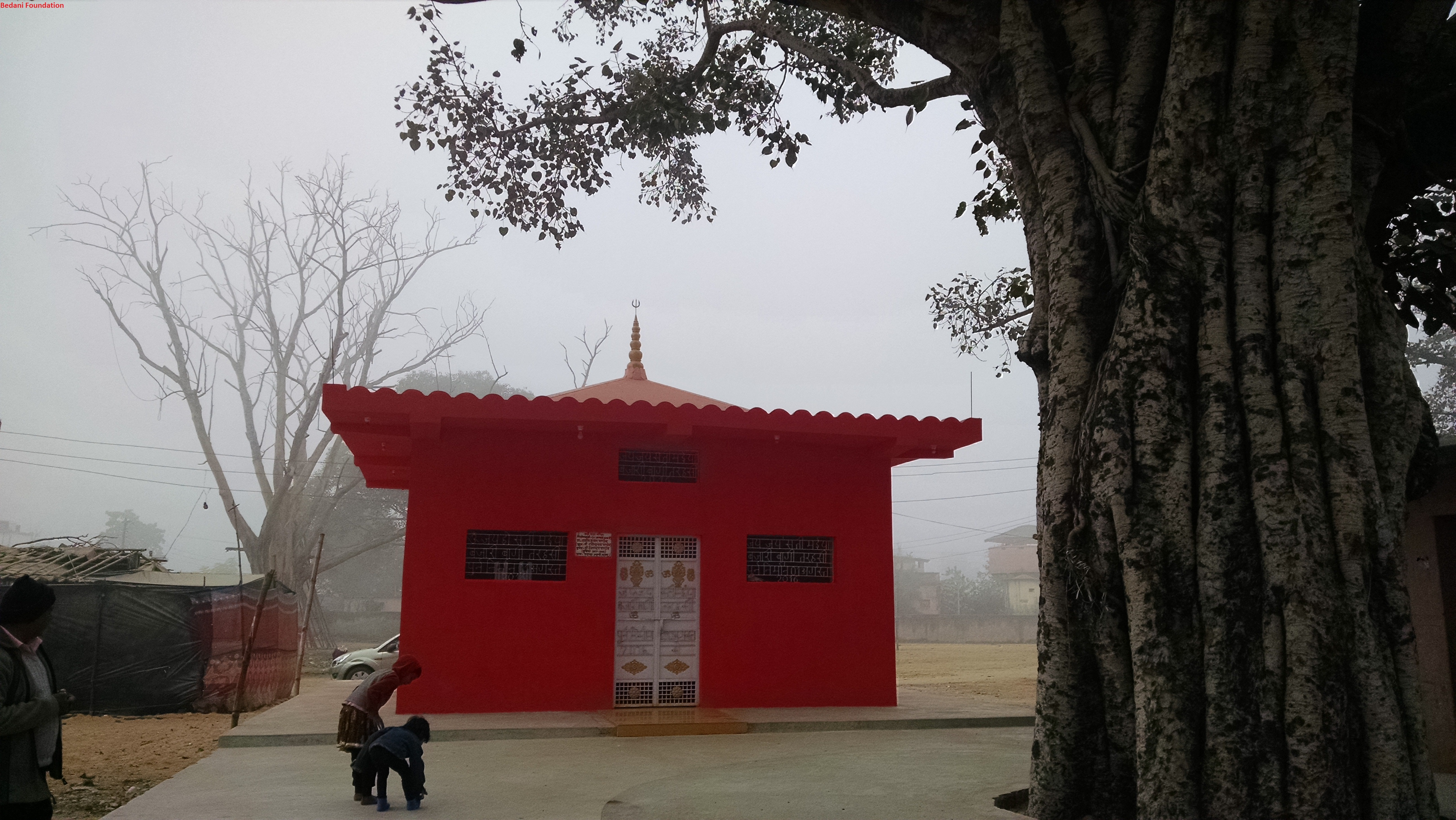

- Tarhasi Block Office

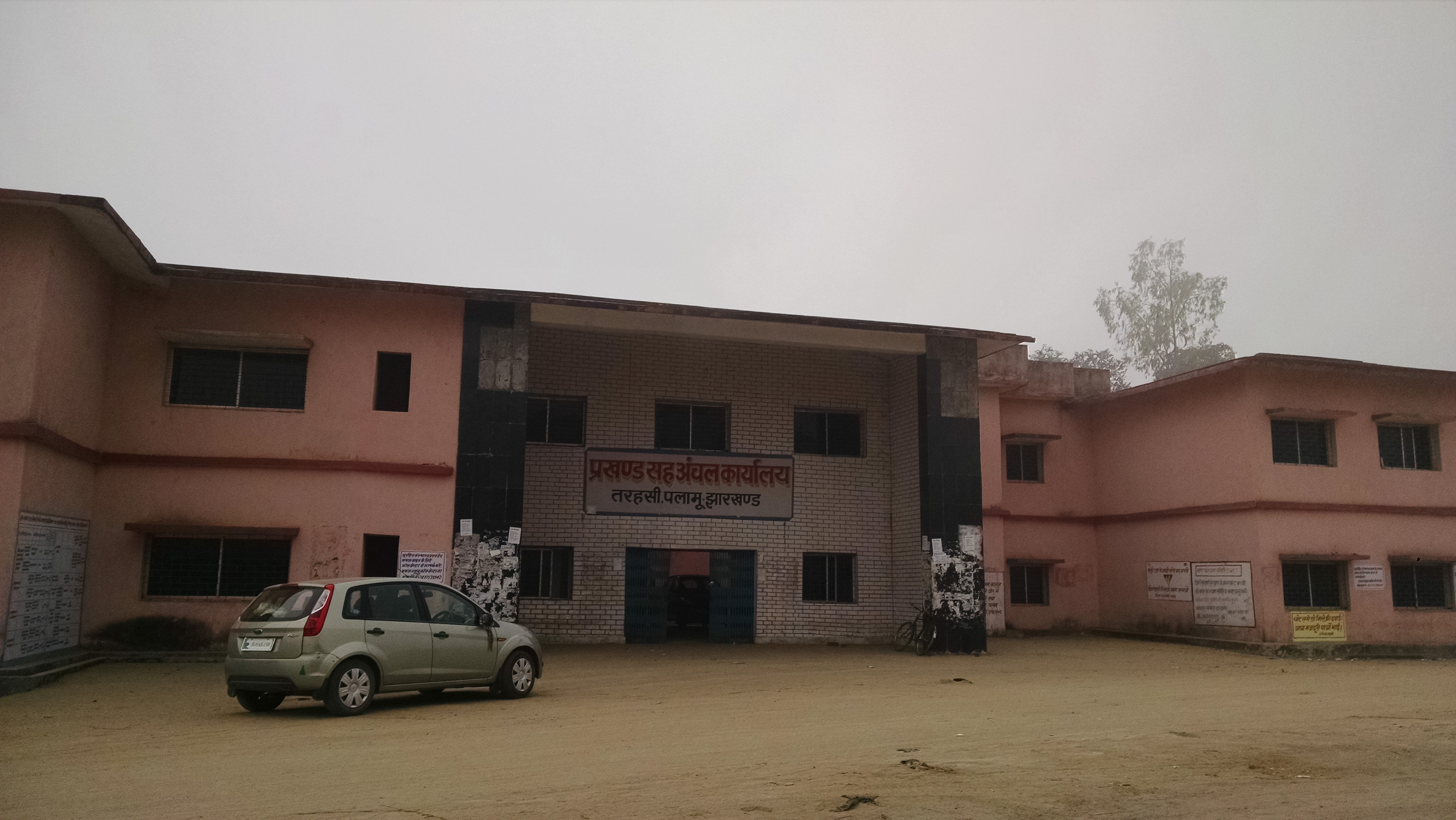

Places nearby: Betla National Park (42 Km from Bedani) and Palamu Fort (47 Km from Bedani)

== Demographics ==
As of 2011 census of India, the village has 143 resident families. The village has population of around 731 of which 383 are males while 348 are females. The population of children with age 0-6 is 102 which makes up 13.95% of total population. Average sex ratio is 909 (lower than Jharkhand's 948); the child sex ratio is 1217 (higher than Jharkhand's average of 948).
