= Gua massacre =

- Location: Gua, Bihar (now in West Singhbhum, Jharkhand)
- Date: 8 September 1980
- Target: Adivasi protesters
- Attack type: Mass murder
- Deaths: 13
- Perpetrator: Bihar Military Police

The Gua massacre took place on 8 September 1980 when forces of the Bihar Military Police (BMP) committed an act of mass murder against the tribals at a hospital in Gua, Bihar (present-day West Singhbhum, Jharkhand).

== Victims ==
The memorial located at Gua in Jharkhand commemorates the victims of the Gua Massacre by listing their names and native villages. The individuals whose lives were lost include Ishwar Sardar of Kairom; Ramo Laguri and Chando Laguri of Churgi; Rango Surin of Kumbia; Baghi Devgam and Jitu Surin of Jojoguttu; Chaitanya Champia of Baihatu; Churu Hansda of Hatnaburu; Jura Purty of Bundu; Gonda Honhaga of Kolaiburu; and Chambe Radhe of Bara Pogam.
