= Tensas =

Tensas may refer to:

- Taensa, sometimes spelled Tensas, a Native American tribe
- Tensas Parish, Louisiana, one of 64 parishes of Louisiana
- Tensas River, a river in the US state of Louisiana
- USS Tensas, a steamer used by the Confederate States during the American Civil War

== See also ==
- Tensa, a mining town in Odisha, India
