= Noamundi =

- Census town

- Location in Jharkhand, India Noamundi (India)
- Coordinates: 22.15°N 85.53°E
- Country: India
- State: Jharkhand
- District: West Singhbhum district
- Founder: King Noamunda sangura
- Named for: Noamunda
- Elevation: 487 m (1,598 ft)

Population (2011)
  - Total: 17,954
  - Rank: 99.9%

Languages
  - Official: Odia, Ho, Hindi, English
- Time zone: UTC+5:30 (IST)
- 833218: 833218,833217
- Vehicle registration: JH

Noamundi is a census town in West Singhbhum district in the Indian state of Jharkhand. It is also an administrative block. It is a mining town located close to the Odisha border. It lies near Jamshedpur and 64 km (40 mi) from Chaibasa. Nearby towns include Padapahar, Barajamda, jagannathpur, Kharsawan, Gua and Kiriburu.

== Overview ==
The major produce of this mine is iron ore (including blue dust). The mines are run by the Tata Steel and most of the residents of this town are employed by this company. In the recent past a lot of private mine-owners have also set up shop in and around the town. A Pelletizing Plant of Tata Steel to convert blue dust to pellets, suitable for use in blast furnace functioned here from 1972 to 1986 but was closed down because it was not economically viable . The town is the right on the border of Jharkhand and Odisha with some of the iron-mines spanning the two states. The portion of iron mining area of Noamundi in the state of Odisha is called Katamati.

Legend has it that when the first iron ore explorers came to this region, they were amazed to find the local tribal population (Adivasis) using iron axes. When the explorers asked the tribals where they had found the ore, they pointed to a hill nearby and called it Noamundi, which literally means 'that hill' in their language. The native tribal are known as Ho people and their language is also known by the same name, Ho.

In spite of the commodity boom across the world over the last couple of years and the consequent effect of this on the area around Noamundi, the trickle down effect of this boom on the local Adivasi population has been negligible. Illegal mining thrives and is the rule rather than the exception. The result is the increased popularity of the Naxalite movement in this area and in greater Jharkhand.

== Geography ==
Noamundi is located at 22.15°N 85.53°E. It has an average elevation of 487 metres (1597 feet). Noamundi is located in the heart of Saranda forest, which is the densest deciduous forest of Asia. 'Saranda' in the local tribal language means 'The land of 700 hills'. The administrative boundary of the Saranda reserve forest, however, lie a few kilometres away. Along with dense forest cover Noamundi, is highly resourceful region. The place is rich in iron ore hematite and Indian multinations like TATA STEEL operate in this region. Apart from forest cover and mining belt, Noamundi has a diversified population, inside the TATA STEEL township people for various regions of India can be found, apart from that being the border of orissa and jharkhand, two most resourceful states of India cultural flavor of both the states can be seen here. With the scenic view of forest cover and hills of saranda forest this region is developing fast.

== Demographics ==
As of 2011 India census, Noamundi had a population of 126,994. Noamundi has an average literacy rate of 78%, higher than the national average of 59.5%: male literacy is 95%, and female literacy is 82%. In Noamundi, 57% of the population is under 6 years of age and 79% of the population is under in Adult.

== Transport ==
Noamundi is a station on the Tatanagar–Barbil section of Howrah-Tatanagar-Rajkharswan-Barbil line 126 kms from Tatanagar station. There is a Jan Shatabdi express which connects Noamundi to Tatanagar and Howrah. There is another intercity express train that connects Noamundi to the holy city of Puri. Being at the border of two of the most naturally rich states in india, the town is very well connected both through rail and road networks.
