= Sukapaika River =

Indian river

Location
- Country: India
- State: Odisha

Physical characteristics
- Source
  - location: 20.432513°N 86.009288°E
- Mouth
  - location: Koel River, India

Sukapaika River is a river that branches out from the Mahanadi River in the Indian state of Odisha. It diverges from the Mahanadi in Ayatpur village, Cuttack district and flows through multiple villages before joining the main river downstream. Sukapaika played an important role in irrigation and agriculture for the region in the past. Over the years, the river has dried up, causing harm to both local ecosystems and livelihoods.
