= Rengali Dam =

Dam in Rengali, Angul, Odisha, India

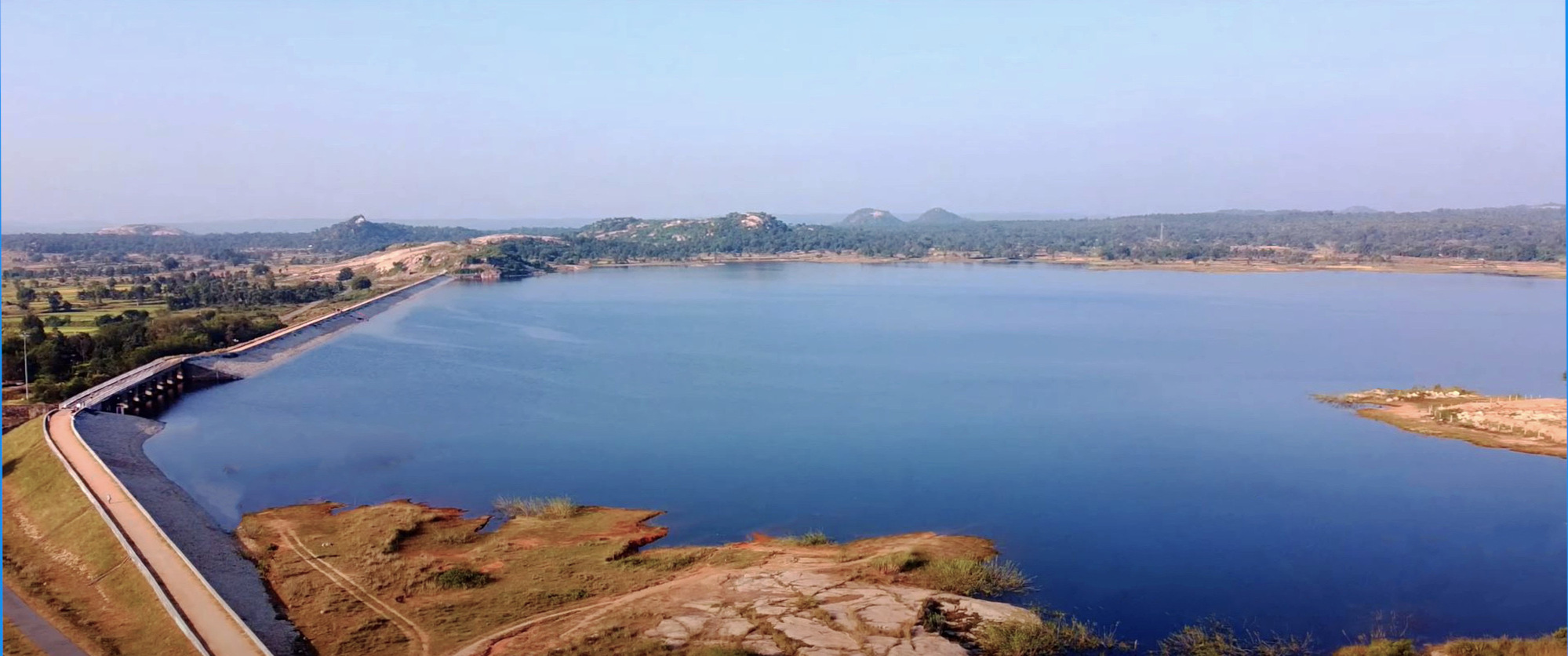
- Rengali Reservoir

- Location within Odisha Location within India
- Country: India
- Location: Rengali, Angul district
- Coordinates: 21°16′36″N 85°01′57″E
- Status: Operational
- Opening date: 1975

Dam and spillways
- Impounds: Brahmani River
- Height: 70.5 m (231 ft)
- Length: 1,040 m (3,412 ft)

Power Station
- Turbines: 5 x 50 MW
- Installed capacity: 250 MW

Rengali dam is a dam located in Odisha, India. It is constructed across the Brahmani River in Rengali village, located 70 km from Angul in Angul district.

== Construction ==
The dam was constructed in 1985. The project was not welcomed by the local people during the conception and initial implementation of the project due to the displacement of 10,700 families and the way the government tackled the issue.

== Features ==
Rengali Dam is 70.5 m tall and 1040 m wide. The reservoir formed by the dam is the second largest in Odisha, with 37,840 hectares at full level and 28,000 hectares at mean level. The reservoir has a catchment area of 25,250 km^{2}, mostly forests and wasteland. The dam is also used to generate electricity using five turbines with a capacity of 50 MW each. The dam holds 4400 million cubic meters of water at full reservoir level (FRL).

== Rengali irrigation project ==
A barrage is constructed across the Brahmani river 35 km downstream of Rengali dam. The barrage is used to store the flood releases from the dam and divert it through two canal systems. It has a free catchment area of 4780 km^{2} between the dam and barrage. The area records an annual rainfall of 1,570 mm on average.

== Environmental impact ==
Bhitarkanika Mangroves, located in Odisha adjacent to Bay of Bengal, faces a unique threat since the construction of this dam. The species of trees in the Mangroves are fed by the unique combination of salt and fresh water from rivers including the Brahmani River. Scientists from the Institute of Minerals and Materials Technology (IMMT) and the Spatial Planning and Analysis Research Centre Private Limited (SPARC) have performed a study on the Effect of reduced water flow through Brahmani-Baitarani river system on the mangrove population of Bhitarkanika estuary.

In their study, the scientists have found that the water flow at the Mangrove delta head before and after the construction of the dam in 1985 is 19,514 million cubic meters and 17,389 million cubic metres respectively. They believe that this level may go down to 14,000 once the full potential of the project will be realised around 2025. They have warned of slow decline and disappearance of the plant species in the Mangroves if a sustainable amount of water is not released into the Mangroves.

== Performance audits ==
The Rengali Irrigation Project has come under the scrutiny of India's apex audit institute twice. First, in the Comptroller and Auditors General of India's report on Odisha [civil] for the year ending March 31, 2000 on Paragraph 4.1 and again on CAG's report on Odisha [civil] for the year ending March 31, 2008 on Paragraph 3.2.

In 2000, auditors looked at non-completion of the project, non-accrual of intended benefits and widespread mismanagement of payment to contractors, particularly with reference to construction of the project up to headworks [barrage]. The report had not been discussed by the Odisha State Assembly's Public Account Committee as of August 2008.

In 2008, auditors noted that "due to delay in acquisition of land / nonacquisition of land, nonreceipt of forest land clearance and poor contract management, the project remained incomplete at various stages with investment of Rs 1695.61 crore (March 2008) resulting in cost overrun by Rs 1461.97 crore (626 per cent) and time overrun by 17 years."
