= Mangroves in India =

Overview of mangrove ecosystems in India

Mangroves in India are coastal ecosystems characterized by salt-tolerant trees and shrubs, found predominantly along the eastern and western coastlines and in the Andaman and Nicobar Islands. India hosts some of the largest mangrove forests in the world, including the Sundarbans, Bhitarkanika, and the Krishna-Godavari delta regions. The total mangrove cover in India is 4,991.68 sq km, which accounts for 0.15% of the country's total area. Indian mangroves form 3% of the South Asia’s mangrove cover.

== Major Mangrove Forests in India ==
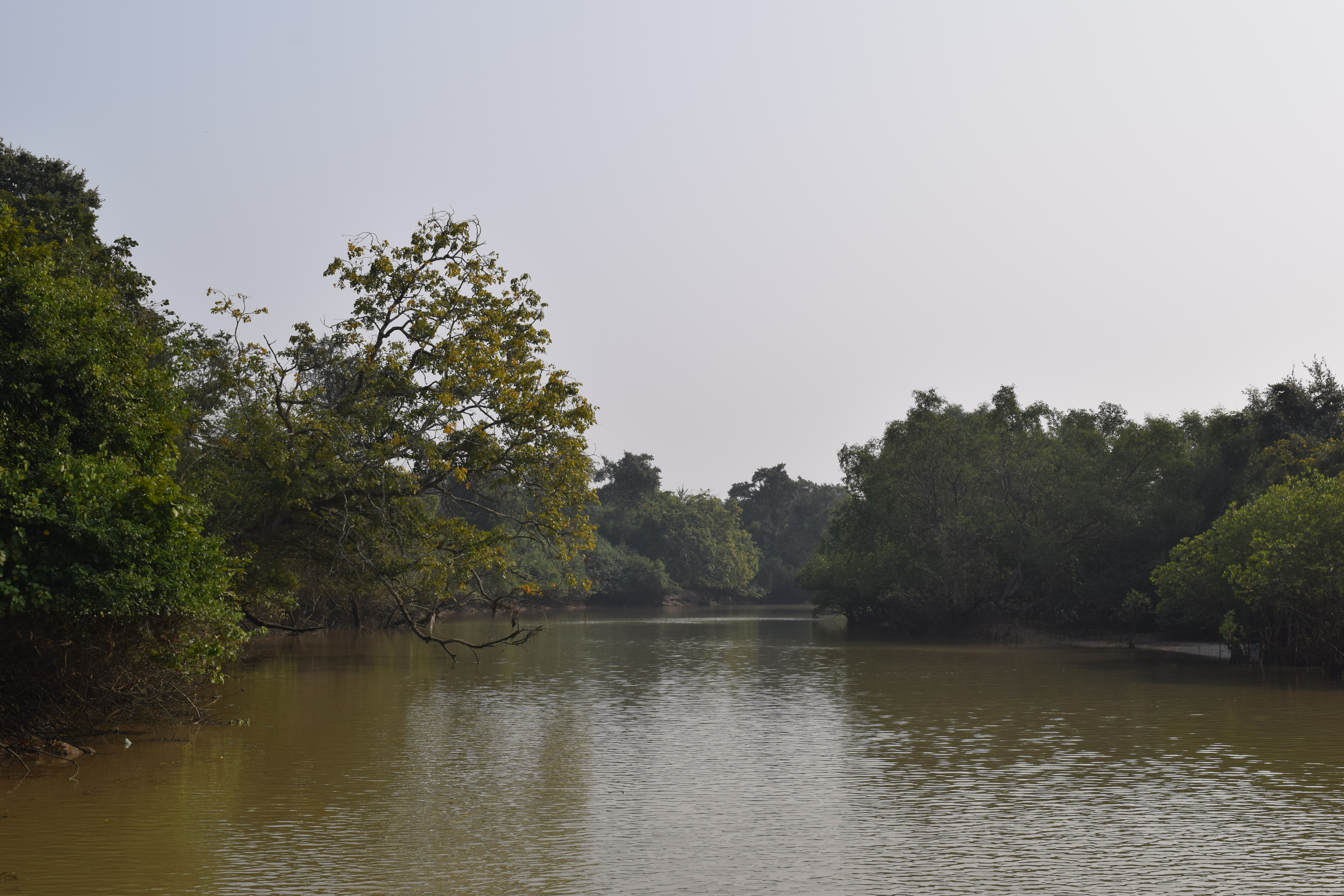
Bhitarkanika Mangroves

India hosts several prominent mangrove forests, each with unique ecological characteristics:

- Sundarbans (West Bengal): The Sundarbans is the largest mangrove forest in India and is part of the Ganges delta. It spans India and Bangladesh and is home to the endangered Royal Bengal tiger (Panthera tigris), saltwater crocodiles, and diverse bird species. The Sundarbans are a UNESCO World Heritage Site, recognized for their unique biodiversity and extensive network of tidal waterways.
- Bhitarkanika Mangroves (Odisha): Located in the Mahanadi delta region, Bhitarkanika National Park contains Odisha's largest mangrove forests. It is known for its saltwater crocodiles, monitor lizards, and olive ridley turtles that nest along its coasts. Bhitarkanika is the second largest mangrove ecosystem in India.
- Pichavaram Mangroves (Tamil Nadu): Situated near the town of Chidambaram, the Pichavaram mangroves are one of the few large mangrove forests in Tamil Nadu. This forest features a unique network of channels and islands, attracting tourists for boat rides and birdwatching.
- Krishna-Godavari Mangroves (Andhra Pradesh): Located in the Krishna and Godavari delta regions, this forested area supports a range of mangrove species. The region is home to both marine and freshwater fish species and acts as a breeding ground for fish and prawns.
- Andaman and Nicobar Mangroves: The Andaman and Nicobar Islands host extensive mangrove forests, which are some of the most diverse in the country. These forests provide critical habitat for diverse species, including the Andaman wild pig and several species of endemic birds. They are crucial for the ecological health of the island ecosystem.

Other minor Mangroves are:

- Kutch Inland mangroves: Unlike typical coastal mangroves, these inland forests thrive in the arid environment of Kutch, characterized by high salinity and fluctuating water levels. The presence of these mangroves is largely attributed to the efforts of local conservationists and changing ecological conditions. Their root systems help prevent soil erosion and combat desertification, contributing to the overall ecological balance of the region.

== Distribution ==
India has a significant area covered by mangrove forests. According to the Indian State of Forest Report (2021), the total mangrove cover in India is approximately 4,992 km^{2}, which constitutes about 0.15% of the country's total geographical area. According to the 2023 report, it decreased to 4,991.68 km square, a decrease of 7.43 sq km in 2 years.

State-wise Distribution of Mangrove Cover in India (2021)
State	Mangrove Cover (km^{2})	Percentage of Total Mangrove Cover
West Bengal	2,112	42.3%
Gujarat	1,177	23.6%
Andaman & Nicobar Islands	616	12.3%
Andhra Pradesh	404	8.1%
Maharashtra	320	6.4%
Odisha	251	5.0%
Tamil Nadu	49	1.0%
Goa	26	0.5%
Kerala	9	0.2%
Karnataka	3	0.1%

== Biodiversity ==
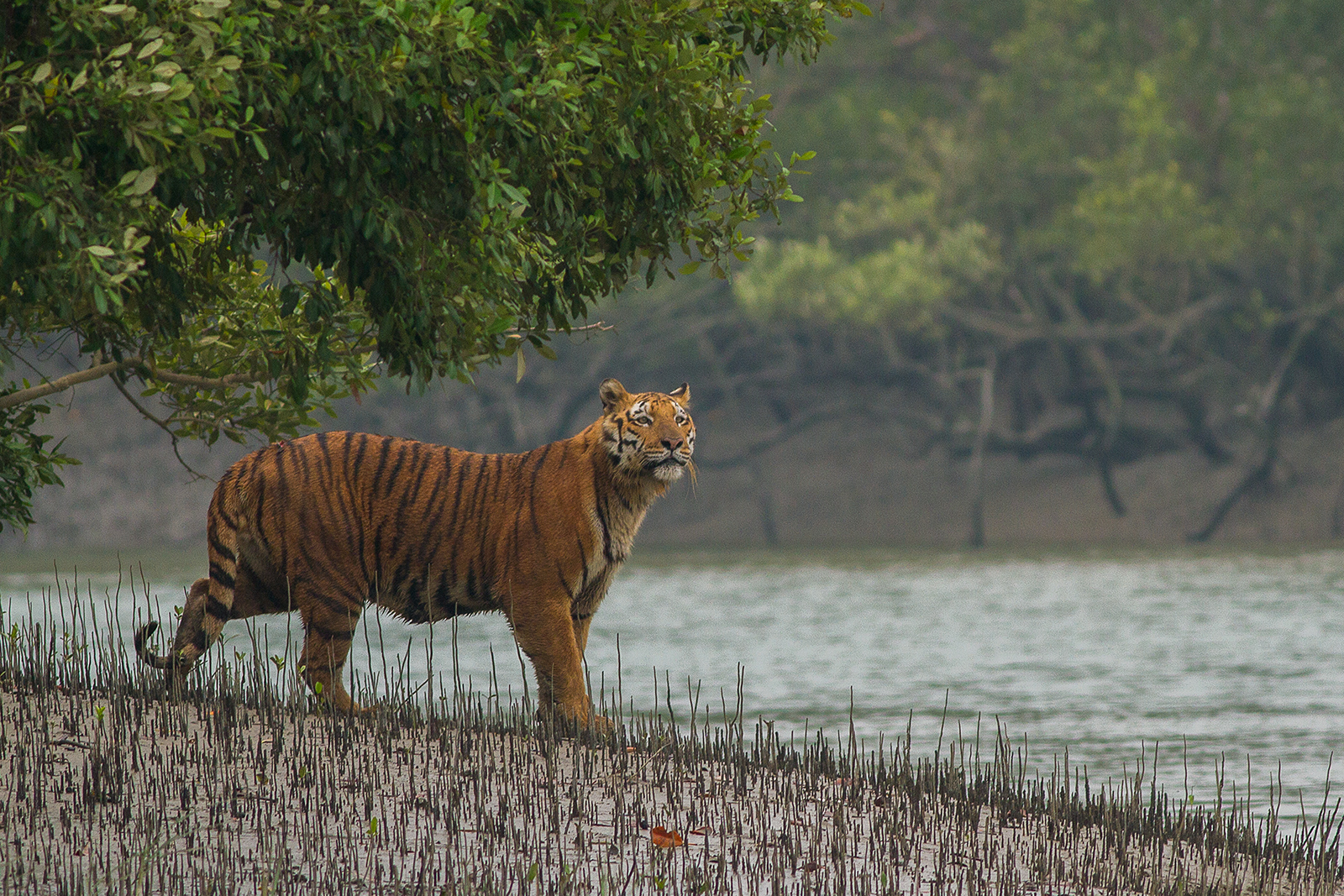
Bengal Tiger in Sundarban National Park

Mangroves in India support diverse flora and fauna, including many species of fish, birds, and other wildlife. They also host several species of mangrove trees, such as Rhizophora, Avicennia, and Sonneratia. The Sundarbans region, in particular, is home to endangered species like the Royal Bengal tiger, as well as numerous rare reptiles and birds.

== Ecological importance ==
Mangroves play a crucial role in coastal protection, acting as natural buffers against storms, erosion, and rising sea levels. They also contribute to carbon sequestration, thus helping mitigate climate change. According to the Indian State of Forest Report (2021), mangroves in India store an estimated 4.9 million tons of carbon per year, contributing significantly to climate change mitigation efforts.

=== Threats ===
Mangroves in India face various threats, including deforestation, pollution, and climate change. Urban development, aquaculture, and tourism have led to significant habitat loss and degradation in many areas. The Indian State of Forest Report (2021) also notes that pollution and salinity changes pose a serious risk to the delicate mangrove ecosystems.

== Conservation efforts ==
The Indian government has implemented several initiatives to protect and conserve mangroves, such as the Coastal Regulation Zone (CRZ) rules and Mangrove Action Plans. Various NGOs are also involved in mangrove restoration projects across the country. As per the Indian State of Forest Report (2021), mangrove conservation has seen positive outcomes in terms of area coverage and habitat restoration, with various regions recording an increase in mangrove cover over recent years.

In 2023, MISHTI (Mangrove Initiative for Shoreline Habitats and Tangible Income) scheme was launched for mangrove preservation and conservation. Through the scheme, Gujarat expanded its mangrove cover by 19,020 hectares in 2025.

== See also ==
- Mangrove forest
- Sundarbans
