= Kansbahal =

- Town
- Location in Odisha, India Kansbahal (India)
- Coordinates: 22.219509°N 84.660645°E
- Country: India
- State: Odisha
- District: Sundargarh

Languages
  - Official: Odia
- Time zone: UTC+5:30 (IST)
- PIN: 770034
- Telephone code: 06624
- Vehicle registration: OD 14, OD 16
- Website: odisha.gov.in

Kansbahal is a modern industrial town situated in the state of Odisha India. It lies on the State Highway #10 about 25 km from Rourkela main city; and on the main railway route between Howrah (Kolkata) and CST/Kurla (Mumbai). Kansbahal comes under the jurisdiction of Rourkela Municipal Corporation.

== History ==
Kansbahal remained a rather unknown tribal village and forested area in the Sundargarh district of Odisha until its emergence into prominence with the establishment of "Utkal Machinery Limited" (UTMAL), a heavy engineering company, mainly serving the Rourkela Steel Plant (RSP) of the Steel Authority of India Limited (SAIL). Utkal Machinery Limited soon evolved into Larsen and Toubro's Heavy Engineering Works.

== Geography ==
Kansbahal abounds in both natural and man-made locations: Mandira Dam, towards the northwest, Water Point, towards the north, Pitamahal Dam, towards the southeast and Kansbahal Dam, towards the south. Two rivers run by Kansbahal - Ghoghar river and Sankh river, with the Ghoghar river finally merging into the Sankh river.

The Sankh river merges downstream with the Koyal river at Vedvyas, giving birth to the famous Brahmani river of Odisha. It is believed that before authoring the epic Mahabharat, the legendary sage Vedavyas used to reside in the caves and forested area beside the river.

Outside the L&T Township, a civil township has emerged with the name Bhilaigarh colony. It has facilities like concrete roads, telephone lines, and electricity. Many of its residents are retired from L & T Kansbahal works.

== Economy ==
Kansbahal developed as a planned township for L&T employees. Development included housing for more than 1,000 employees and their families, schools, medical facilities, transportation, roads, and recreational facilities. Employees from different parts of India also settled in the township.

While L&T Kansbahal Works has had its ups and downs due to changes in the structure of L&T Ltd., the economy of the region and that of the country, the place itself has rapidly developed into a modern mini-city, comparable in many ways to those in developed nations. Many smaller communities have developed around and outside Kansbahal because of the growing importance of Kansbahal. The schools here, largely aided by L&T, have played a very important role in developing the region as a whole. Earlier, Montfort School Complex was the local high school. It prides in having regular classes up to the 10+2 level in 3 separate languages - English, Hindi and Odiya - a unique feature not found anywhere else in the region. The generations that have studied at Montfort School Complex are now placed at important places in India as well as abroad. Right now, D.A.V. has taken up the same responsibility.

The plant premises of L&T township are divided into two major sections - the North Colony and the South Colony. Other smaller sections are Old Colony, New Colony, L.I.C Colony, New L.I.C Colony, Central Colony, Security Colony, Teachers Colony, R.S. Colony, Gwalapada and Mehtab Road, Bilaigarh. For guests, there is a fully furnished AC Guest House in North Colony. All schools are located in the South Colony. D.A.V. Public School (formerly Montfort School Complex) and Utmal School have two football grounds each. All major sports events are held in one or more of these grounds.

Residents of L&T Township actively participate in different cultural and recreational activities at the many clubs of Kansbahal. These include the North Colony Club, South Colony Club, Utkal Jyoti, Milani Club, Gunjan Club, Kansbahal Kala Kendra and the Mahila Samiti.

== Transport ==
Kansbahal railway station on the Tatanagar–Bilaspur section of Howrah-Nagpur-Mumbai line is located in the southernmost end of the L&T Township while the SH 10 passes through the Mahtab Road area on the northernmost end.

== Education ==
Indian Institute of Production Management (IIPM), formerly Indian Institute of Foreman Training (IIFT), is another internationally recognized institute located in Kansbahal. IIPM serves to train professionals from India and abroad in advanced industrial fields. IIPM, was established by ICICI Limited in 1983 with the active support of L&T Ltd and the Government of Odisha. IIPM in collaboration with L&T, ICICI and Usha Martin has also set up a B- School named IIPM School of Management in 2007, under the Biju Patnaik University of Technology (BPUT). This B-school is also recognized by AICTE. IIPM completed 25 years of its glorious existence on 24 October 2008.

Purushottam Institute of Engineering and Technology is a B.Tech engineering college affiliated to BPUT located in Mandiakudar. Mandiakudar is a small village, it gained popularity because of its proximity to engineering colleges. Presently there are two institutes in Mandiakudar located in the same campus of Purushottam Vihar. Purushottam School of Engineering and Technology is one of the diploma engineering college located in Mandiakudar of Purushottam Vihar campus. This college is affiliated to SCTE & VT which was opened in 2008. Mandiakudar has well connectivity of buses through national highway 24 to city of Rourkela and Sambalpur. Purushottam vihar campus has one small post office run by Indian Post Office with hostels for boys and girls studying in these engineering college. The Purushottam vihar campus is half a kilometre away from IIPM School of Management and 1 km from Kansbahal .

=== Schools ===
Utmal English Primary School, D.A.V. Public School(Formerly Montfort School), Kansbahal Upper Primary School, Harrison English School, Karlakhaman School, Panchayat School, Laing School(Bimala Devi high school) are the main schools.

== Faith ==
The shrines are Ghoghar Temple, dating back to antiquity, and the relatively recent ones, Jagannath Temple near the Kansbahal Railway Station, Ayyappa Temple (near Ghoghar Temple) Ganesh and Hanuman Temples in Central Colony, Gurudwara on Station Road (South Colony), St. Joseph's Church near D.A.V. School(Formerly Montfort School Complex) in New Colony, (G.E.L.) Gossner Evangelic Lutheran Church in R.S. Colony, Trinath Mandir in South Colony and Sunni Jamma Masjid at Bhilaigarh.
