= Meghahatuburu =

- Census town
- Location in Jharkhand, India Meghahatuburu (India)
- Coordinates: 22.07°N 85.26°E
- Country: India
- State: Jharkhand
- District: Pashchimi Singhbhum

Area
  - Total: 1.650 km^{2} (0.637 sq mi)
- Elevation: 785 m (2,575 ft)

Population (2011)
  - Total: 5,992
  - Density: 3,632/km^{2} (9,406/sq mi)

Languages
  - Official: Hindi, Ho, Santali
- Time zone: UTC+5:30 (IST)
- PIN: 833223
- Telephone code: 06596(Noamundi)
- Vehicle registration: JH-06
- Website: www.chaibasa.nic.in

Meghahatuburu (mentioned in census records as Meghahatuburu Forest village) is a census town in West Singhbhum district of the Indian state of Jharkhand. The town was largely built by the Steel Authority of India Limited as it is the Raw Material Division of SAIL.

== Overview ==
The towns of Meghahatuburu and Kiriburu are contiguous, sharing many local facilities, Meghahatuburu & Kiriburu are in West Singhbhum district of the state of Jharkhand.

They are differentiated by MIOM and KIOM, the two iron ore mines. Meghahatuburu is a major tourist centre of Jharkhand. It is adjacent to a very dense forest (Saranda) and has streams and mountain ranges. Megahatuburu is very rich in iron ore and many companies are excavating the ore. This place had an annual rainfall of 128cc which has decreased because of the cutting of trees.

== List of places ==
There are many great places to visit in Kiriburu and Meghataburu, some of them are, Saranda Forest, Pundul Waterfall, Swapneswar Temple, Khandadhar Waterfall, Sanaghagara Waterfall, etc.

== Demographics ==
Historical population
Year	Pop.	±%
1981	3,319	—
2001	6,887	+107.5%
2011	5,992	−13.0%
Note: Meghahatuburu was declassified in 1991; Source: Census of India

As of 2011 India census, Meghahatuburu has a population of 5,992 of which 3,153 are males and 2,839 are females. Child (0–6) population is 581, which is 9.70% of the population. Scheduled tribes constitute 44.18% of the population while Scheduled castes constitute 12.63% of the population.

Religions in Meghahatuburu Forest Village:
1. Hinduism (50.1%)
2. Christianity (13.7%)
3. Islam (5.69%)
4. Sikhism (0.80%)
5. Other religions and persuasions (29.6%)
6. Not stated (0.03%)
