= Gahirmatha Beach =

Beach in Odisha, India

Coordinates: 20.744188°N 87.000282°E

Gahirmatha Beach (Odia: ଗହୀରମଥା ବେଳାଭୂମି) is a beach in Kendrapara district of the Indian state of Odisha. The beach separates the Bhitarkanika Mangroves from the Bay of Bengal and is the world's most important nesting beach for olive ridley sea turtles. The beach is part of Gahirmatha Marine Wildlife Sanctuary, which also includes the adjacent portion of the Bay of Bengal.

== Location ==
Gahirmatha is the only marine wildlife sanctuary of Odisha. This was notified as such in Government of Odisha, Forest & Environment Department Notification No. 18805/ F&E dated 27 September 1997 and published in the Odisha Gazette, extraordinary No. 1268 dated 17 October 1997. It is located between 86 degrees 45' 57" to 87 degrees 17' 36"- east longitude and 20 degree 17' 32" to 20 degree 45'58" - north latitude. The total area of the sanctuary is 1435.0 km^{2}, with 1408.0 km^{2} of the surface area comprising water and 27.0 km^{2} of land mass including reserve forests, mud flats, and accreted sandbars. The core area of the sanctuary consists of 725.50 km^{2} and the buffer zone accounts for 709.50 km^{2}. The entire sanctuary area comes within the revenue district of Kendrapara.

== Olive ridley sea turtles ==
The Odisha coast has the world's largest known rookery of olive ridley sea turtle. Apart from Gahirmatha rookery, two other masses are there where nesting beaches have been located which are at the mouth of rivers Rushikulya and Devi. The spectacular site of the mass congregation of olive ridley sea turtles for mating and nesting enthralls both the scientists and the nature lovers throughout the world. An event that took place in April 2017 validates this phenomenon. In this month, it was reported by forest officials that at least two lakh (200,000) baby olive ridley turtles have come out of their pits within a span of 24 hours. This news was received well by conservation societies and wildlife lovers. Events like these are expected to last at least a week at the Gahirmatha Beach. That rarity of mass congregation and the cruelty meted out to these innocent marine creatures, paved the way for declaration of the stretch of water body from old lighthouse near Batighar to Maipura river mouth as Gahirmatha (Marine) Wildlife Sanctuary.

Olive ridley sea turtles migrate in huge numbers from the beginning of November, every year, for mating and nesting along the coast of Odisha. Gahirmatha coast has the annual nesting figure between one hundred to five hundred thousand, each year. there has been decline in the population of these turtles in the recent past due to mass mortality. Olive ridley sea turtle has found place in Schedule - I of Indian Wildlife (Protection) Act, 1972 (amended 1991). All the species of sea turtles in the coastal water of Odisha are listed as "vulnerable" as per IUCN Red Data Book. The sea turtles are protected under the 'Migratory Species Convention' and CITES (Convention of International Trade on Wildlife Flora and Fauna). India is a signatory nation to all these conventions. The 'Homing' characteristics of the ridley sea turtles make them more prone to mass casualty. The voyage to the natal nesting beaches is the dooming factor for the sea turtles. Since Gahirmatha coast serves as the natal nesting beach for millions of turtles, it has immense importance on turtle conservation.

=== Food habits ===
Olive ridley sea turtles feed on marine snails, smaller forms of fish, fish eggs, crustaceans, and jellyfish. The algal material is also used as food by the ridleys. Ridleys generally crush and grind the food materials before intaking.

=== Migration ===
The best feeding ground of sea turtles may not be the best nesting ground for them. The sea turtles migrate thousands of kilometers to meet both the ends. It has been observed that olive ridley sea turtles migrate from the coastal water of Sri Lanka in the Indian Ocean to the coastal water of Gahirmatha in the north. The 'Homing' characteristics and the uncanny ability to orient itself in open sea help the sea turtles to migrate over long distance without getting lost in the vastness of the sea. Mating immediately after the arrival of ridley sea turtles in the coastal water of Gahirmatha, they indulge in mating activities. Males mount over the females and are often seen floating on the surface with the intermittent movement of flippers. Sometimes more than one male is seen mounting over one female. The courtship continues for hours unless there is any external threat. A female will continue to mate with several males throughout the breeding season. Mostly the mating pairs are seen off the coast of Ekakula. Nesting The mass nesting behavior of olive ridley sea turtles is known as "Arribada". Thousands of female carrying turtles scramble on the nesting beach at Nasi - I & II islands to release the eggs in flask-shaped cavities. The turtles scoop the soft sand to a depth of 45 cm with the help of flippers and release 100 to 180 eggs. Before scampering on to the beach, the turtles survey the nesting ground from the sea and in case they smell and danger, they shun the beach and search for safer breeding ground. The urge to release the egg is so intense that they are so oblivious of the presence of any foreigner, at the time of nesting. Generally, dark nights are preferred by the ridleys for nesting. It has been observed that nesting takes place once the southerly wind starts blowing. The period of emergence and retreat into the sea after nesting takes 45 to 55 minutes. Due to the shrinkage of the nesting beach, overcrowding of turtles is observed during nesting. The eggs which are scooped out by successive nesters is known as "doomed" egg as it would never be able to hatch. Sporadic nesting is also not uncommon. These eggs are mostly damaged by predators. The nesting females emit hissing noise at the time of laying eggs as the intake of oxygen is maximum at that moment. After laying eggs, the female turtle fills up the pit with sand by the flippers and tries to camouflage the pit site. The mother turtle rams the pit with the help of its body's heaviness.

=== Hatching ===
The eggs inside the flask-shaped pits, being incubated by the sun and the metabolic heat, hatch after 50 to 60 days. The hatching takes place during the night or in the predawn period to avoid predation by jackals, dogs, and birds. The walls of the pit gradually collapse, thereby allowing the eggs on the lower strata to rise upwards. After the emergence of hatchlings, they immediately head for the open sea. The tiny replicas of turtles are in a frenzy to enter the sea water. This is the most spectacular sight. The hatchlings orient themselves by the reflection of stars on seawater or by the brighter horizon and head en masse towards the sea. The hatchlings swim deep into the sea until they reach the sea current. During this period large-scale mortality of hatchlings take place. It is studied that 1 in 1000 survives. Bigger fishes, ghost crabs or seagulls either predates the hatchlings. Then the period of "lost year" begins.
