= Mandiakudar =

- Village
- Location in Odisha, India Mandiakudar (India)
- Coordinates: 22.2265808°N 84.6954703°E
- Country: India
- State: Odisha
- District: Sundargarh

Languages
  - Official: Odia
- Time zone: UTC+5:30 (IST)
- PIN: 770034
- Telephone code: 06624
- Vehicle registration: OD 14
- Website: odisha.gov.in

Mandikudar is a small village situated near the outskirts of steel township Rourkela. Its jurisdiction is entitled to town of Kansbahal. Mandiakudar got its name from a staple crop named "Mandia" which was cultivated by poor people in that area. The village is about one kilometer away from Kansbahal situated in between State Highways SH 24 and SH 10.

Mandiakudar gained popularity because of the proximity of engineering colleges residing in the area. Most popularly the Degree and Diploma college of Purushottam Institute of Engineering and Technology (PIET) situated there. The nearest community hospital is at village of Beldihi. There is a small post office run by Indian postal department in the campus of PIET, which offers service of Speed Post, Post Box, Postal Savings Bank and ATM.

At present day Mandiakudar is known as food hub for travellers. Starting from breakfast to dinning, people can find numbers of Dhaba's over here popular among them are Sonu Dhaba and Beecury's Tasty Breakfast shop.

== Economy ==
Residents of Mandiakudar gain their economy from running small restaurant, grocery stationary shops and working in factories near the old campus of Purushottam Institute of Engineering and Technology. Mandiakudar has a petrol pump of Indian Oil.

== Factories ==
Factories located in Mandiakudar are:

- Subh Labh Cements Pvt. Ltd.
- Ajax M&M Pvt. Ltd.
- Reliable Hitech (Fabrication)
- Agrasen Sponge Iron Pvt. Ltd.
- Shree Galva factory
- Kkrishna Vaahan Pvt Ltd. (Dealers of Tata Motor Truck's)
- Force Motors - Dealers Tahera Motors
- Rungta TMT Bar warehouse.

== Transport ==
The village is situated near the state highway of SH 24 and SH 10 and has frequent local buses and express buses traveling from Sambalpur to Rourkela and vice versa.

== See also ==
- Kansbahal
