= Bhitarkanika Mangroves =

Mangrove wetland in Odisha, India

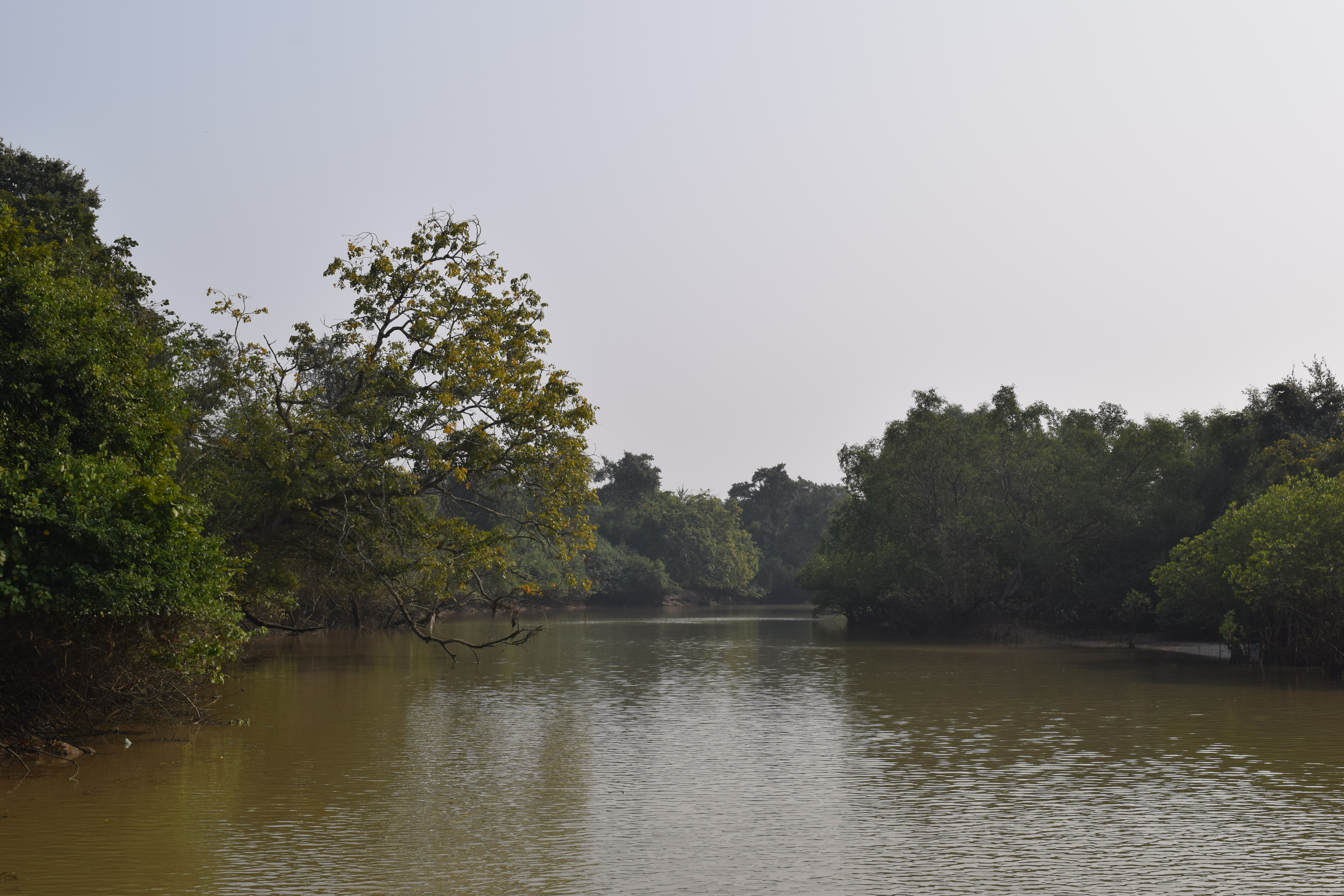

Ecology
- Realm: Indomalayan realm
- Animals: saltwater crocodile, olive ridley turtle

Geography
- Area: 650 km^{2} (250 mi^{2})
- Country: India
- State: Odisha
- Coordinates: 20.730696°N 86.866511°E
- Oceans or seas: Bay of Bengal
- Rivers: Brahmani River
- Climate type: Am

Ramsar Wetland
- Designated: 19 August 2002
- Reference no.: 1205

Bhitarkanika Mangroves is a mangrove wetland in Odisha, India, covering an area of 650 km^{2} (250 sq mi) in the Brahmani River and Baitarani River deltas.

== History ==
The Bhitarkanika Mangroves were zamindari forests until 1952, when the government of Odisha abolished the zamindari system, and put the zamindari forests in the control of the state forest department. In 1975, an area of 672 km^{2} (259 sq mi) was declared the Bhitarkanika Wildlife Sanctuary. The core area of the sanctuary, with an area of 145 km^{2} (56 sq mi), was declared Bhitarkanika National Park in September 1998. The Gahirmatha Marine Wildlife Sanctuary, which bounds the Bhitarkanika Wildlife Sanctuary to the east, was created in September 1997, and encompasses Gahirmatha Beach and an adjacent portion of the Bay of Bengal. Bhitarkanika Mangroves were designated a Ramsar Wetland of International Importance in 2002.

== Flora and fauna ==
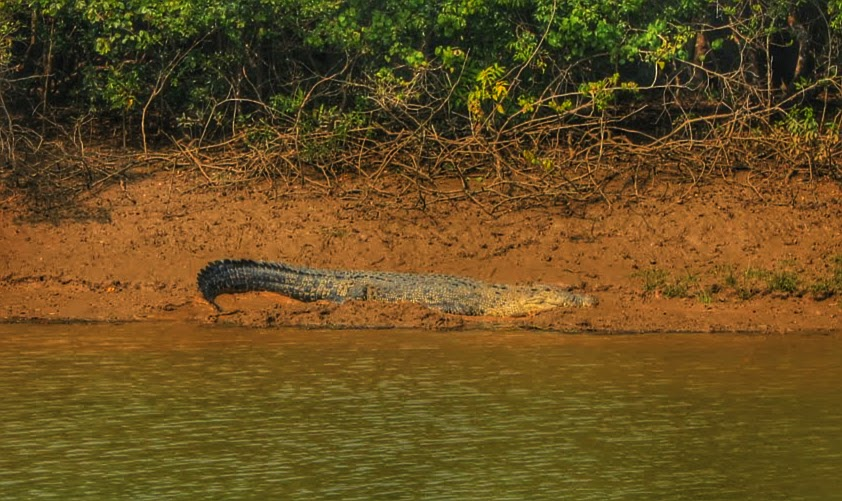
A saltwater crocodile in Bhitarkanika Mangroves

About 62 mangrove species occur in the Bhitarkanika Mangroves, including Avicennia, Bruguiera, Heritiera and Rhizophora. Reptiles present in the mangroves include saltwater crocodile, king cobra, Indian python and water monitor. Between August 2004 and December 2006, 263 bird species were recorded, encompassing 147 resident and 99 migrant species. A heronry encloses about 4 ha (9.9 acres), where 11,287 nests were counted in 2006.

Olive ridley turtles arrive in January to March for nesting at Gahirmatha Beach. An average of 240,000 nests per season was estimated between 1976 and 1996. Up to 80,000 turtles were captured every year until 1982. Since 1983, collecting and marketing turtles and their eggs has been banned.

== See also ==
- Mangroves in India
