= Burha River =

Coordinates: 23°40′N 84°06′E

Burha River Burhaghagh River

Location
- Country: India
- State: Jharkhand
- district: Latehar district

Physical characteristics
- Mouth: North Koel River

The Burha River (also called Burhaghagh River) flows through the Latehar district of Palamu division in the Indian state of Jharkhand.

A little to the south of Betla National Park is the wide bowl shaped Chhechhari valley, with a high hill range around it. The rim of the bowl forms the watershed from which dozens of rivulets arise. These join together to form the Burha river, one of the major tributaries of the North Koel.

Chhechhari valley is surrounded by lofty hills on every side. This valley is a complete basin with the scrap of the great tableland of Sirguja on the west, on the south the range that overlooks the Barwe Valley in Ranchi district, on the east Netarhat and Pakripat, and in the north the spur crowned by the fort of Tamolgarh and the Burha Pahar, 910 metres (3,000 ft) high, round the foot of which flows the river of the same name, which is the only outlet for the waters of the valley

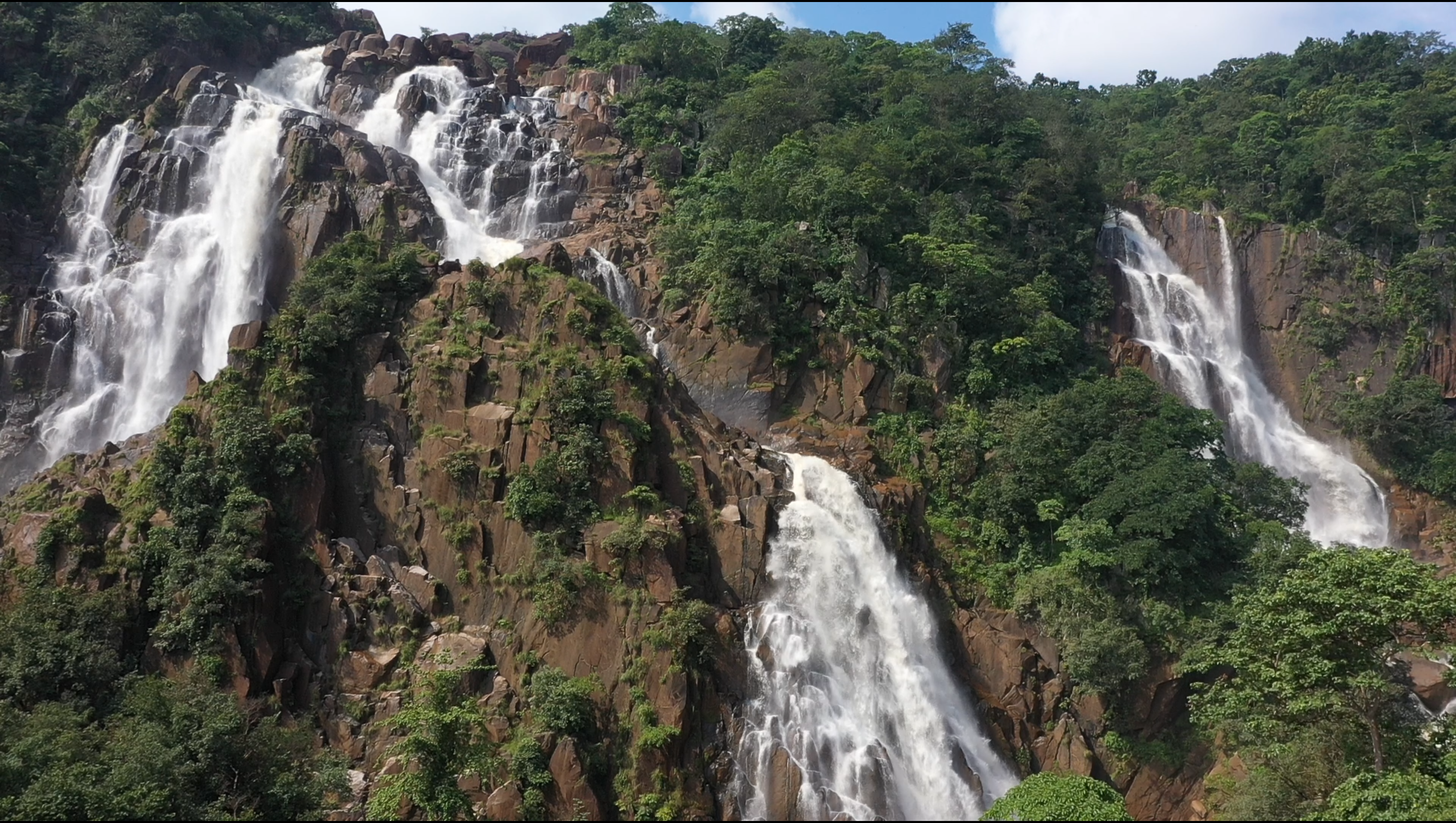
Lodh Falls, the highest waterfall in Jharkhand in Burha river

In its upper reaches the Burha River leaps though three waterfalls: Lodh Falls or Burhagaugh Falls, which is 142 metres (466 ft) high; Gutamgaugh Falls, 36.57 metres (120.0 ft), and Gharaghugra Falls, 7.62 metres (25.0 ft).

At some places the river forms the state boundary between Jharkhand and Chhattisgarh. It carries a large volume of water during rains over a rocky river bed but during dry months it almost dries up. From Lodh Falls to Bagechampa it flows through beautiful forests and above Kutku at Bagechampa it flows into the North Koel.
