= Kadua River =

River in India

Coordinates: 19.932122°N 86.181294°E

Kadua river is located in Odisha state, India, and formed by the confluence of two streams at Charigan village. The 22-mile long Kadua drains the area between Prachi and Kushabadra rivers before joining the Bay of Bengal.
