= Bhede River =

River in Odisha, India

Coordinates: 21.788412°N 83.977690°E

The Bhede River is a river in India and is a tributary of the Telen River, which in turn is a tributary of the Mahanadi. The Bhede is located in Odisha.

Four instream storage structures were being built at Budharaja, Kirasasan, Saida and Gochhara in Kuchinda in 2024.
