= North Karo River =

River in Jharkhand, India

Coordinates: 22°52′59″N 85°03′58″E

- Native name: ऊत्त्तरि कारो नदी (Hindi)

Location
- Country: India
- State: Jharkhand

Physical characteristics
- Source
  - location: Ranchi Plateau
- Mouth
  - location: Koel River, India

The North Karo River (Hindi: ऊत्त्तरि कारो नदी) drains the Indian state of Jharkhand.

It originates on the Ranchi Plateau. It forms a 17-metre (56 ft) high scarp falls, Pheruaghaugh, at the southern margin of the Ranchi plateau. It drains the Gumla, Ranchi and West Singhbhum districts. It joins the South Koel near Serengda. The meandering valley of the Karo river, downstream from Pheruaghaugh falls is a typical example of an incised meander.

== Koel-Karo project ==
The Koel-Karo project is located in the Ranchi and West Singbhum districts. The 710-mW power project involves the construction of two earth dams—one, 44 metres (144 ft) high, across the South Koel river near Basia, and the other, 55 metres (180 ft) high, across the North Karo river near Lohajima. The two dams will be linked by a trans-basin channel, with six units of 115 mW each in the underground powerhouse at Lumpu-ngkhel and one unit of 20 mW at Raitoli. About 120 villages are to be affected, displacing over one lakh (100,000) people. About 22,000 hectares (54,000 acres) are to be submerged. Of the total land acquisition, 12,000 hectares (30,000 acres) are reported to be agricultural land, while 10,000 hectares (25,000 acres) comprise forests. Dispute arose over the compensation package for the displaced people and protests started in 1974 and have been continuing since then.
