= Brahmani River =

River in Odisha, India

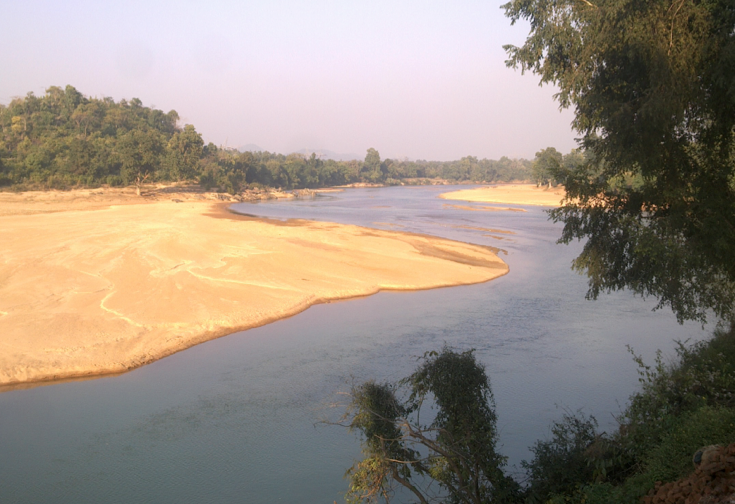
- Native name: ବ୍ରାହ୍ମଣୀ ନଦୀ (Odia)

Location
- Country: India
- State: Odisha

Physical characteristics
- Source: Confluence of South Koel River and Sankh River
  - coordinates: 22°14′45″N 84°47′02″E
- Mouth: Bay of Bengal
  - elevation: 0 m (0 ft)
- Length: 799 km (496 mi)
- Basin size: 39,033 km^{2} (15,071 sq mi)

Basin features
- Tributaries
  - left: Kharasrota River,Paika River
  - right: Khadia River

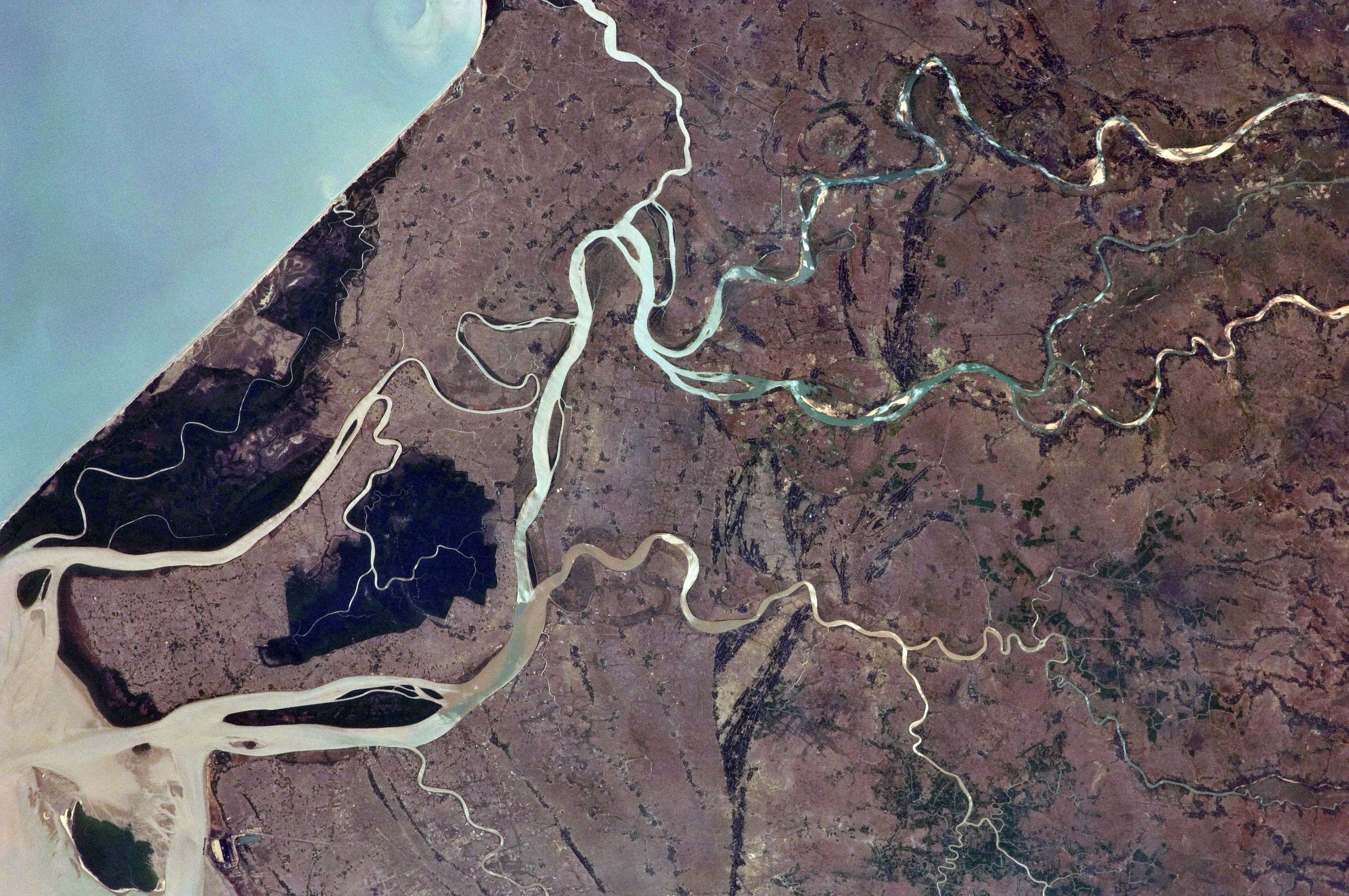
Aerial satellite imagery of Brahmani delta, mangrove and beach ridges

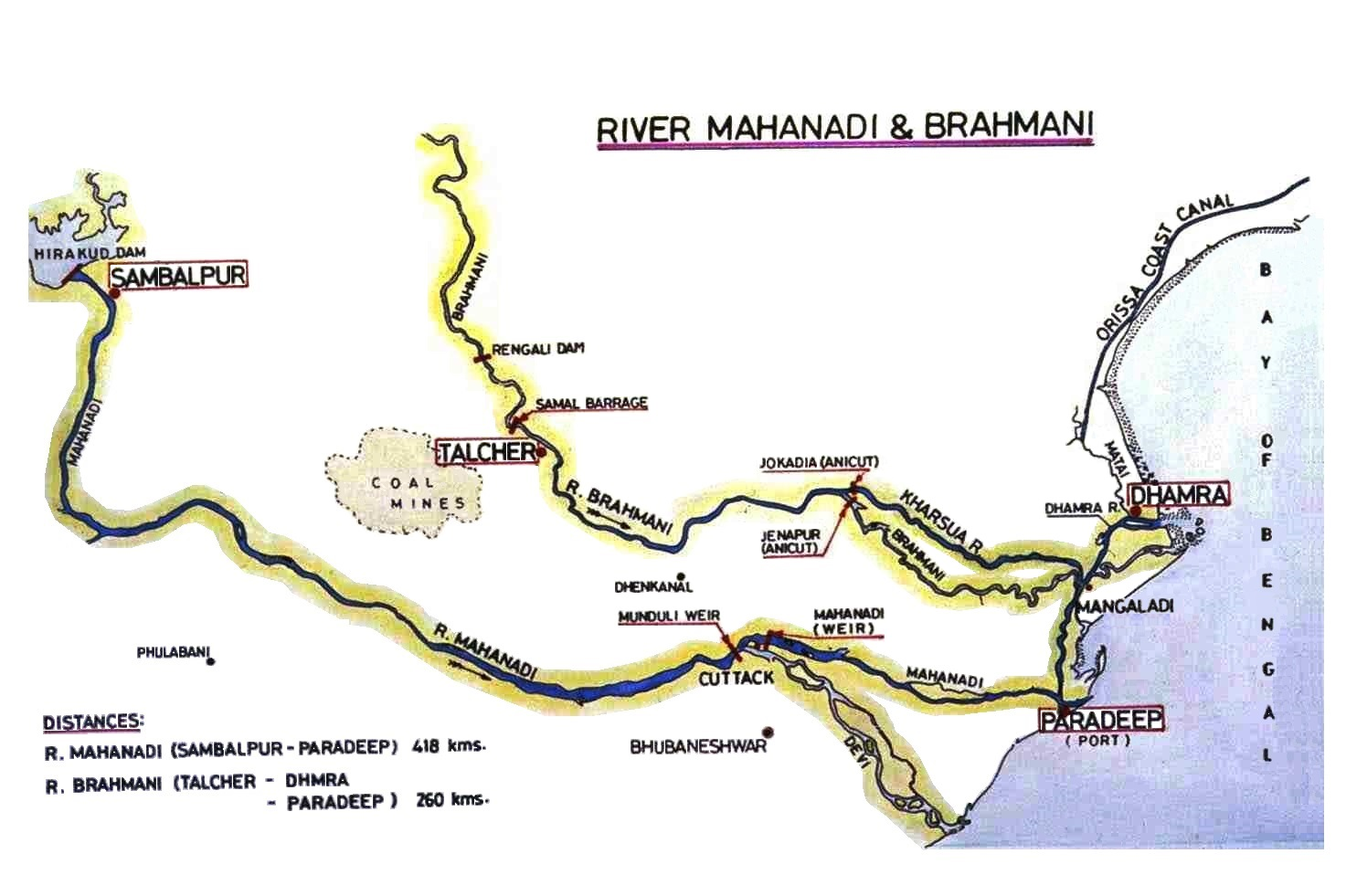
The Brahmani River System Map (top)

The Brahmani is a major seasonal river in the Odisha state of eastern India. The Brahmani is formed by the confluence of the Sankh and South Koel rivers, and flows through the districts of Sundargarh, Angul, Dhenkanal,Jajapur and Kendrapara. Also the South Koel can be considered as the upper reaches of the Brahmani. Together with the river Baitarani, Brahmani forms a large delta before emptying into the Bay of Bengal at Dhamra. It is the second widest river in Odisha after Mahanadi.

== Sources ==
The Brahmani is formed by the confluence of the rivers South Koel and Sankh near the major industrial town of Rourkela at 22 15'N and 84 47' E. The Sankh has its origins near the Jharkhand-Chhattisgarh border, not far from the Netarhat Plateau. The South Koel too arises in Jharkhand, near Lohardaga, on the other side of a watershed that also gives rise to the Damodar River. Both of these sources are in the Chota Nagpur Plateau. The site of the Brahmani's origin is mythologically reputed to be the place where Sage Parashara fell in love with the fisherman's daughter, Satyavati who later gave birth to Ved Vyasa, the compiler of the Mahabharata. The place is thus called Ved Vyasa.

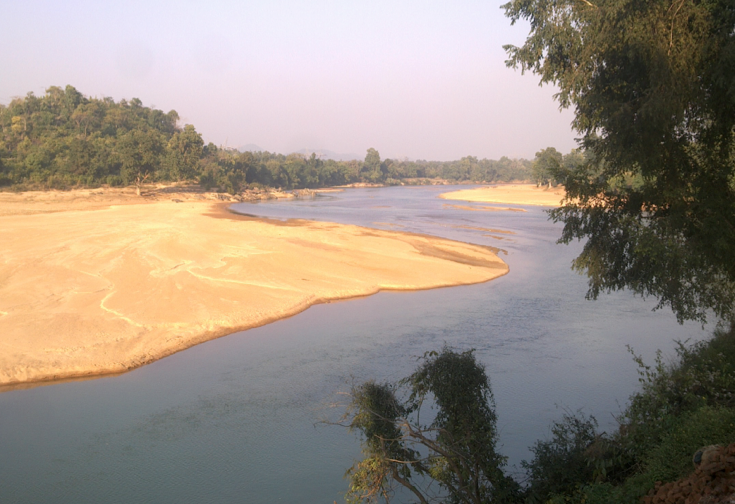
South Koel river near Jaraikela, Orissa. One of the two tributaries of Brahmani River

After assuming the name of Brahmani, the river crosses the Tamra and Jharbera forests, skirting along National Highway 23. It then passes the town of Bonaigarh in Sundargarh district before being dammed at Rengali in Anugul district. A large reservoir of the same name is created as a consequence. It is then joined from the right by the Tikira (Tikra) and the Singadajore. It then flows through the town of Talcher before being joined from the right by the Nigra. It flows past the town of Dhenkanal before splitting up into two streams. The main stream flows by the town of Jajpur Road beyond which it is crossed by National Highway 16 and the Kolkata-Chennai mainline of East Coast Railway. The branch stream called Kimiria receives the waters of the Birupa (a distributary of the Mahanadi, Kelua and Genguti before rejoining the main stream at Indupur). It then flows crisscrossing through Pattamundai. The river then receives the Kharsuan, on its left bank before merging with the Baitarani, a major river, to form the Dhamra estuary. A distributary called Maipara branches off here to join the Bay of Bengal a short distance away while the main stream proceeds northward for a few km more before ultimately meeting the sea near Chandbali at Palmyras Point. The Brahmani delta is the site of the Bhitarkanika wildlife sanctuary, famous for its estuarine crocodiles.

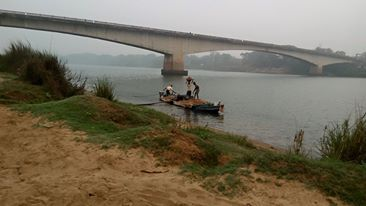
Patrapur Bridge on Brahmani River in Pattamundai along SH-9A

== Length and catchment ==
At about 480 kilometres (300 mi) long, the Brahmani is the second longest river in Odisha after the Mahanadi. However, if its constituent rivers are included, its length extends to about 799 kilometres (496 mi), of which 541 kilometres (336 mi) are in Odisha. It has a catchment area of about 39,033 square kilometres (15,071 mi^{2}) in Odisha alone.

== Irrigation projects ==
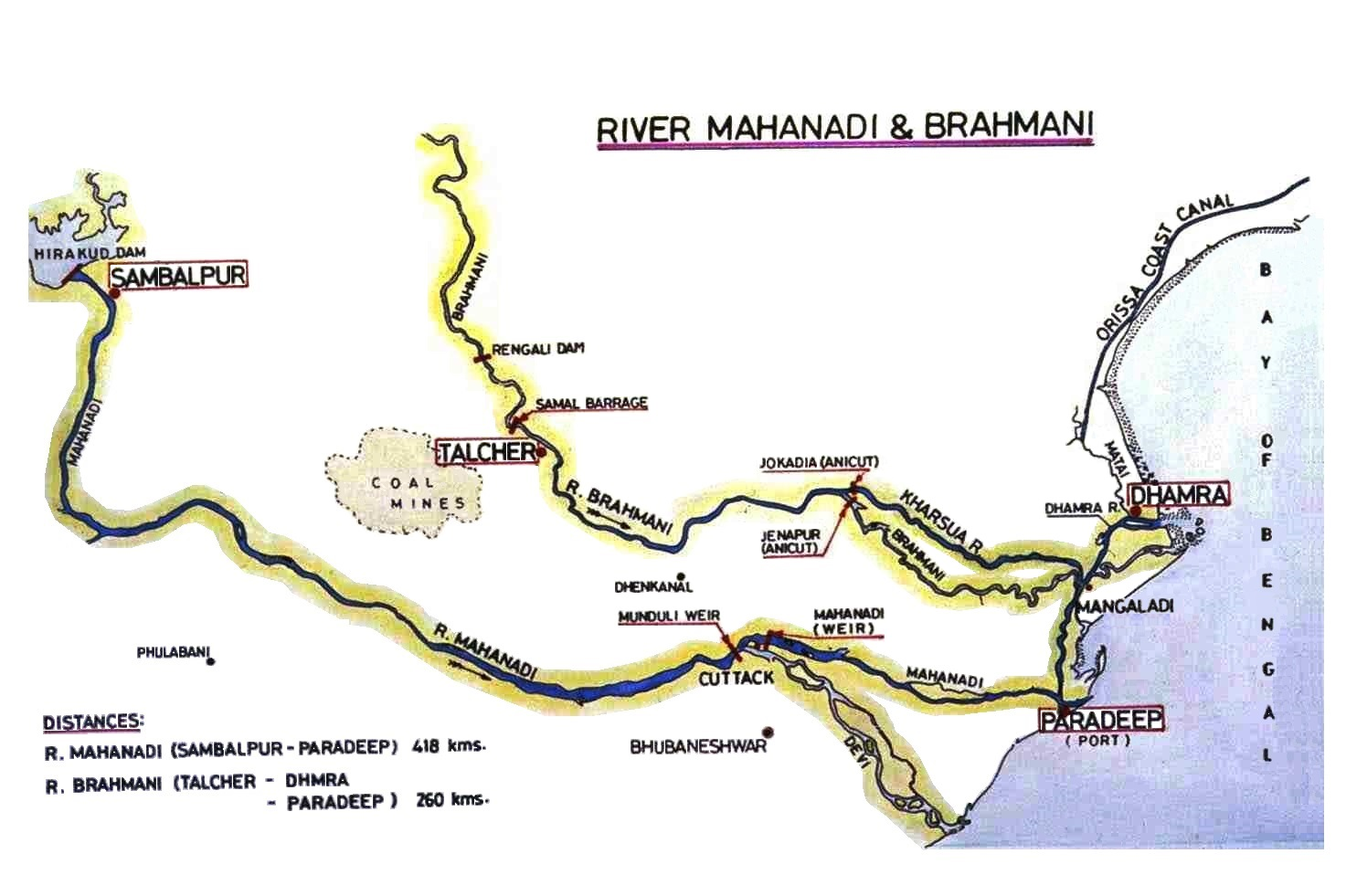
Map of the Brahmani and Mahanadi rivers

Apart from the Rengali dam mentioned above, there also exists a barrage shortly before Talcher called Samal Barrage. The Jokadia and the Jenapur anicuts are the other irrigation projects on the river. Near its mouth, the river is also integrated with the Odisha Coast Canal of the East Coast Canal.
