= Telen River =

River in India

Coordinates: 21.806°N 84.162°E

The Telen or Tel River is a tributary of the Mahanadi in East Central India. The Bhede River is a tributary to this river in Orissa. The historical Kolabira Fort is situated on the bank of this river. Jharsuguda town lies on the bank of this river.
