= Amanat River =

- Location of the mouth Amanat River (India)

Location
- Country: India
- State: Jharkhand

Physical characteristics
- Mouth: North Koel River
  - coordinates: 24°07′30″N 84°03′43″E

The Amanat River flows through the Chatra and Palamu districts in the Indian state of Jharkhand.

== Course ==
The Amanat originates on the Hazaribagh plateau, and then forms the southern boundary of Lawalong Wildlife Sanctuary, in Simaria police station area of Chatra district. Thereafter, it flows almost due west through Palamu district till it joins the North Koel River five miles north of Daltonganj. It flows through a rich, well cultivated valley; and is the principal drainage channel of the east of the Palamu district.

=== Tributaries ===
Its tributaries are: Jinjoi, Sapni, Maila and Piri.
