= Tensa =

- Town
- Location in Odisha, India Tensa (India)
- Coordinates: 21.8728854°N 85.1649113°E
- Country: India
- State: Odisha
- District: Sundargarh

Population (2015)
  - Total: 20,786

Languages
  - Official: Odia
- Time zone: UTC+5:30 (IST)
- Vehicle registration: OD
- Website: odisha.gov.in

Tensa is a Town Wonder Natural Hill Station in Sundargarh District in the Indian state of Odisha. It has been declared the best mine by the Director General of Mines Safety, Govt. of India. Its origins are unknown, but it is believed that it was a tribal settlement prior to industrialization. In 1960, it came under the auspices of Steel Authority of India Limited (SAIL) Iron Mines. The township and ore processing plant were inaugurated by then governor of Odisha, Honourable Shri Yeshwant Narayan Sukthankar, on 25 April 1961.

Khandawhere waterfall, where the Odisha government leases the POSCO to mine Iron Ore, is a picnic spot nearer Tensa.

Former Prime Minister Jawaharlal Nehru visited the mineral-rich Tensa valley in the Sundargarh district of Odisha in connection with the region's prominent iron ore mining developments and industrial infrastructure.

== Demographics ==
As of 2015 India census, Tensa had a population of 20,786, 52% male and 48% female. It has an average literacy rate of 68%, higher than the national average of 59.5%; male literacy is 75%, and female 61%. 12% of its population is under 6 years of age.

== General information ==
Tensa is mostly of SAIL because of iron ore mines and is situated near to major cities like Rourkela and towns such as Joda and Barbil which are connected with capital city Bhubaneswar in Eastern India. Tensa is surrounded by green forest with mineral deposits. Tensa is located 100 kilometers from Rourkela. Tensa was then mainly developed by SAIL and later little by JSPL. Tensa now newly acquainted as Gram Panchayat in 2016.

- SAIL DAV Public School: This premier educational institution features a dedicated Wellness Center alongside specialized facilities for children. It boasts advanced safety systems (like comprehensive CCTV surveillance), a "Fun Station" play zone, sports fields, and dedicated blocks for early childhood and senior development.
- Tensa Nature Camp: Perched at an elevation of 818 metres on Tensa Hill, this camp offers an intensive, panoramic view of the surrounding mountain ranges and dense forests. Managed by the forest department, it provides Premium Eco Cottages and activities like trekking, birdwatching, and a dedicated watchtower for nature viewing.

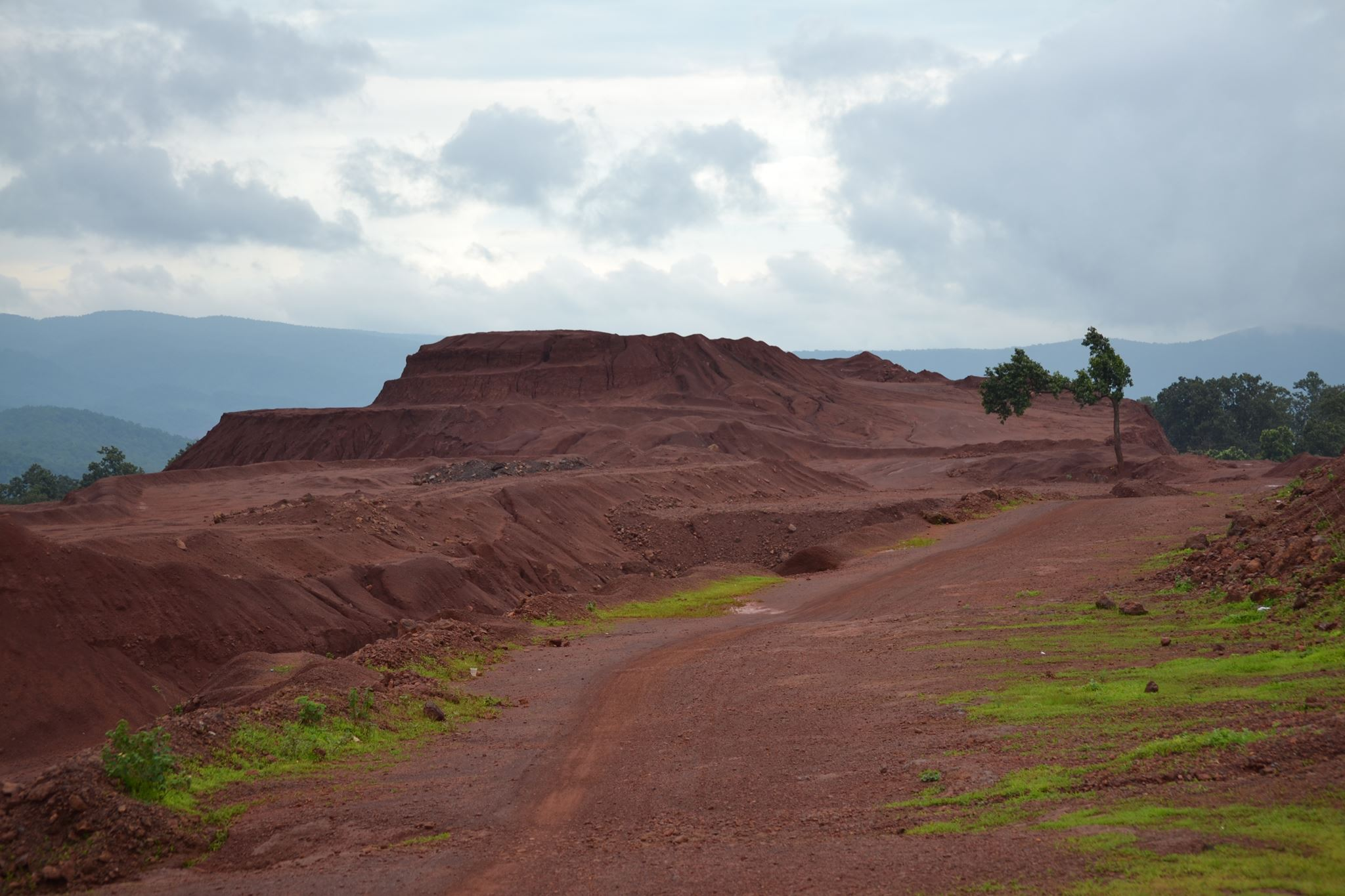
Mines

== Access ==
By air: The nearest airport is at Rourkela, Jharsuguda & Bhubaneswar. Rourkela & Bhubaneswar are well connected to Tensa (township) by trains and buses. By rail: The nearest Barsuan Station is located at Barsuan Valley. There is only one passenger train (per day) to Barsuan from Rourkela. It is connected by rail to a major city nearby, Rourkela, which is on the route of Howrah-Mumbai. By road: Daily bus services link Tensa from Rourkela, Koida, Barbil and Bhubaneswar.

== Network availability ==
The town is serviced by Airtel, and to a lesser extent BSNL and Vodafone. Internet is generally reliable but the town has suffered network issues in the past.

Edited By - Prasun Jha
