= Saranda forest =

Forest in Jharkhand, India

- Location within Jharkhand Location within India

Geography
- Location: West Singhbhum, East Singhbhum, Jharkhand, India
- Coordinates: 22.2°N 85.35°E
- Area: 820 square kilometres (320 sq mi)

Administration
- Status: Reserve Forest
- Established: 1882
- Authority: Jharkhand Forest Department
- Website: www.sarandaforest.in

Ecology
- Dominant tree species: Shorea robusta

Saranda forest is a dense forest in the hilly region of West Singhbhum, East Singhbhum, Saraikela district in the Indian state of Jharkhand. This area used to be the private hunting reserve of the Singh Deo family (the erstwhile rulers of Saraikela). The forest covers an area of 820 km². Saranda (Serengda) literally means "700 hills" in local language.

The perennial rivers, Karo and Koina, pass through these forested areas supporting a diverse floral and faunal resource. Sal (Shorea robusta) is the most important tree in the forest. Although sal is a deciduous tree and sheds its leaves in early summer, the forest undergrowth is generally evergreen, which has such trees as Mangoes, Jamun, Jackfruit, and Piar. Other important trees are Mahua, kusum, Tilai, Harin hara (Armossa rohitulea), Gular (Ficus glomerata), and Asan.

The reserved forests hosts many animals. Wild elephants are common in Saranda and Porahat forests. It is an important overlapping habitat of the elephants from adjacent Kedunjhar (Keonjhar) district of Odisha. Herds of Sambar and Chital roam about the forests. Bison is still found. Tigers were never numerous. Leopards are more common.

The iron ore mining towns including Gua, Chiria, Kiriburu and Noamundi. The area was previously disturbed by Maoist and Naxal influences, but problems have subsided in recent years, and it has turned out to be a major tourist hub. There are many tourist places in the Manoharpur region. The peak season between October and March is now brimming with tourists.

Thalkobad is a scenic village at a height of 550 m (1,800 ft) in the heart of the forest. Thalkobad is about 89 km (55 mi) from Chakradharpur, 46 km (29 mi) from Manoharpur, and about 160 km (99 mi) from Jamshedpur.
