= Koina River =

River in Jharkhand, India

Coordinates: 22°14′13″N 85°17′49″E

Location
- Country: India
- State: Odisha, Jharkhand

Physical characteristics
- Source
  - location: Bhangaon, Odisha
- Mouth
  - location: Koel River
- Length: 83 km (52 mi)

The Koina River (Hindi: कोयेना नदी) (Odia: କୋଯେନା ନଦି) flows through West Singhbhum in the Indian state of Jharkhand.

The Koina originates near Bhangaon in Odisha, and flows for 83 kilometres (52 mi) before it joins the South Koel River. It flows through Saranda forest.

Many of the rivers in the area dry up in the dry season. However, the Koina contains plenty of water at the height of the hot season even when no rain has fallen for many months. It has many more feeder streams than some of the others which may account for its perennial flow.
