= Gua, Jharkhand =

City in India

Gua
- Census town
- Location in Jharkhand, India Gua (India)
- Coordinates: 22.2°N 85.38°E
- Country: India
- State: Jharkhand
- District: Pashchimi Singhbhum
- Elevation: 435 m (1,427 ft)

Population (2001)
  - Total: 10,891

Languages
  - Official: Hindi, Ho, Odia
- Time zone: UTC+5:30 (IST)
- PIN: 833213
- Telephone code: 06596
- Vehicle registration: JH

Gua is a census town in Pashchimi Singhbhum district in the Indian state of Jharkhand. It is a mining township situated in the Chotanagpur Plateau. The mines are operated by the Steel Authority of India Limited and are linked to IISCO at Burnpur.

Despite its small geographical area, Gua holds a dominant position in Jharkhand politics. Many private companies such as Jindal Steel, Adhunik, Rungta, Ashirwad Enterprises make huge profits from the area, but show little interest in education, healthcare, and other necessities of the general public. A school, DAV Senior Secondary Public School, is run by the DAV community to support the holistic development of students.

== Demographics ==
As of 2001 India census, Gua had a population of 10,891. Males constitute 52% of the population and females 48%. Gua has an average literacy rate of 63%, higher than the national average of 59.5%: male literacy is 74%, and female literacy is 50%. In Gua, 14% of the population is under 6 years of age.

The local inhabitants are known as Ho people, while the second largest group of inhabitants in the area is Oriya.

== Geography ==
The source of water at Gua is the South Karo River.

== Economy ==
Gua Ore Mines, now operated by the Steel Authority of India, has an estimated reserve of 234 million tonnes of iron ore. Manual mining started in 1923. It was mechanised in 1958.

== Culture ==
The main festivals of Gua are Durga Puja, Diwali, Kali Puja, Makar Sankranti, Vishwakarma Puja, Ganesh Chaturti, Sarhul, Karma, Ram Navami, Krishna Jayanti, Basanti Puja, Chatt, Mage Purv, Eid and Mines Safety Week as well.

== Transport ==
Gua is well connected by rail and road to major township of Chaibasa, Chakradharpur, Tatanagar(Jamshedpur), Rourkela, Cuttack and Bhubaneshwar. A direct train comes from Tata to Gua every day- Tata Gua passenger. There are a few bus services to Tata every day as well. There is a train from Jamda( 10 km from Gua) to Calcutta- Jan Shatabdi express which connects Gua to the nearest metro.
