= North Koel River =

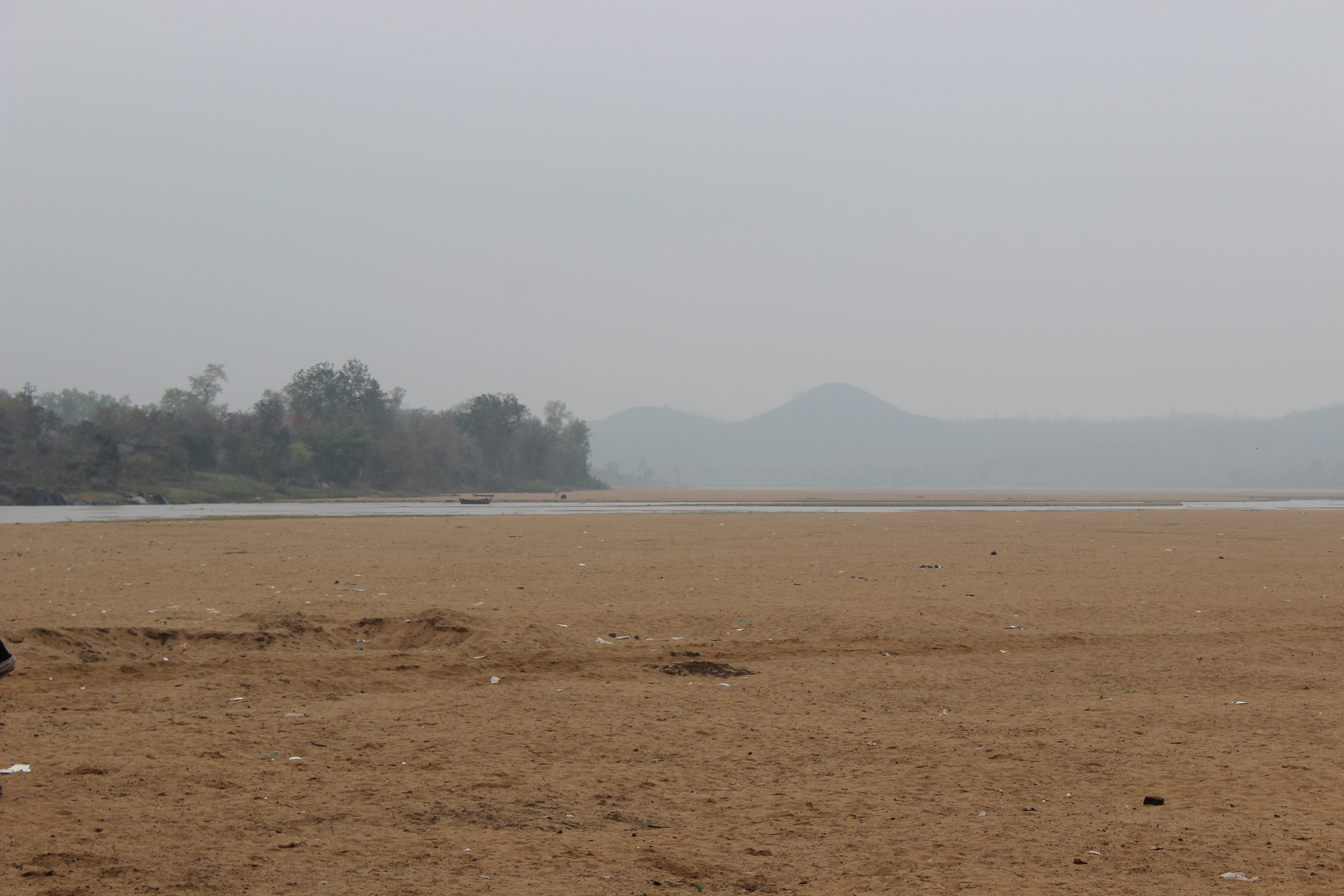
- North koel river at Betla National Park

Location
- Country: India
- State: Jharkhand

Physical characteristics
- Source
  - location: Chulha Pani, Lohardaga district, Jharkhand
  - coordinates: 23°38′09″N 84°41′05″E
- Mouth: Son River
  - location: Haidarnagar
  - coordinates: 24°31′51″N 83°52′38″E
- Length: 360 km (220 mi)

Basin features
- Tributaries
  - left: Auranga River, Amanat River, Burha River

North Koel River flows through the Indian state of Jharkhand.

== Course ==
The North Koel rises on the Chhota Nagpur plateau and enters Latehar district, below Netarhat near Rud. After flowing nearly due west for about 32 kilometres (20 mi), it turns north at an almost complete right angle through a gorge at Kutku, and flows through the centre of the district until it falls into the Son a few miles north-west of Haidarnagar.

From its source to its junction with the Son its length is about 260 kilometres (160 mi), and since it drains a catchment area of at least 9,100 square kilometres (3,500 sq mi), it naturally contributes a large supply of water to the Son during the rains; at other times the stream is not deep enough to enable cargo boats of even small dimensions to make their way up to Daltonganj. In many places the reaches of this river present scene of great beauty and sometimes even of grandeur, such as the rocky bed and rapids north of Hutar and the gorge at Kutku.

Mention may be made of the metamorphic rocks which form the watershed between the North Koel and the Damodar to the west of the Chandwa-Balumath road.

The North Koel, along with its tributaries, meanders through the northern part of Betla National Park.

=== Tributaries ===
The principal tributaries are the Auranga and the Amanat, both of which join it from the east, the former at Kechki, 16 kilometres (10 mi) south and the latter 8 kilometres (5 mi) north of Daltonganj. Another tributary is the Burha, which joins the North Koel above Kutku at Bagechampa.

== North Koel Project ==
The North Koel project is being implemented at Mandal near Kutku. The project has a 64.82-metre (212.7 ft) high dam, from which water will be released for picking up by the Mohammadganj Barrage and Indrapuri Barrage. This Dam will be known as Kutku Dam. Hydro-electric power generation would be 2 x 12 MW. The construction of the dam was started in 1972 but halted in 1993 as it did not receive environmental clearance as the dam falls inside the Palamu Tiger Reserve.

In November 2018, the environment ministry gave the approval and environmental clearance for construction of the dam. The dam will flood 11,000 hectares of forest land of Palamu Tiger Reserve and seven villages. On 5 January 2019, the prime minister of India, Narendra Modi, laid the foundation stone for construction. In 2023, the Central government hiked its share of project costs for completion of the project. The villages were received compensation during starting of the project. But villagers again demanded compensation and rehabilitation of affected families. In 2023, construction of the dam was halted due to disagreement between the government and villagers on the issue of numbers of affected families, their rehabilitation. Jharkhand state government has not decided the compensation amount, so the Central government have not released any compensation fund. This resulted in the halt of construction work.
