= Kiriburu =

- Mandal/Hill Station
- Location Kiriburu (India)
- Coordinates: 22.1083°N 85.2951°E
- Country: India
- State: Jharkhand
- District: Pashchimi Singhbhum (West Singhbhum)
- Elevation: 990.64 m (3,250.1 ft)

Population (2001)
  - Total: 9,544

Languages
  - Official: Odia, Ho
- Time zone: UTC+5:30 (IST)
- PIN: 758040
- Telephone code: 06596
- Vehicle registration: OD-09

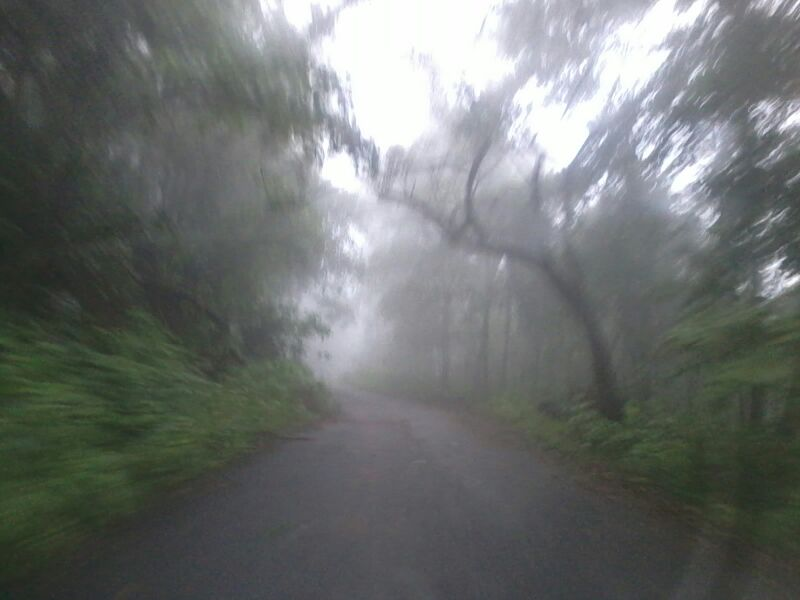

Kiriburu is a census town in the border of Jharkhand and Odisha. The term Kiriburu refers to the forest of Elephants in Mundari (Kiri = Elephant and Buru = Forest) due to the large number of elephants found in this forest.

It is a famous hill station situated in the core of Saranda forest, which means "land of seven hundred hills". The forest has some waterfalls such as Jhingara, Pundul, Ghagrita and Shadunala. Apart from the rich flora and fauna, the town is also known for having big Iron-ore Mines KIOM (Kiriburu Iron-Ore Mine) & MIOM (Meghahatuburu Iron-Ore Mine) both governed by Steel Authority of India Limited (SAIL).

== Overview ==
The towns of Meghahatuburu and Kiriburu are contiguous as they are located in Jharkhand & Odisha respectively and share many local facilities. The official pin codes of Kiriburu and Meghahatuburu are 758040 and 833223. Most of the People work in SAIL Iron Ore Mines.

== Demographics ==
As of 2001 India census, Kiriburu had a population of 9,545. Males constitute 52% of the population and females 48%. Kiriburu has an average literacy rate of 67%, higher than the national average of 59.5%: male literacy is 76%, and female literacy is 57%. In Kiriburu, 14% of the population is under 6 years of age, set by sharma. The local inhabitants are known as Ho people. It is also located in the maoists belt.

Kiriburu is easily accessible and is connected to various important places. The road from Kiriburu to Jamshedpur and Ranchi has been upgraded by the iron companies. The other route is to Barbil and Manoharpur . It can be reached from Tatanagar by road or by rail, the nearest railway station being Barajamda, 24 km away. Mining town of Barbil in the Keonjhar District of Orissa is 28 km from Meghahataburu by road. Direct Train - Jan Shatabdi- from Howrah (West Bengal) is available up to Barbil, from where you can catch hired taxis / SAIL Company bus to Kiriburu or Meghahatuburu.

Kiriburu is sometimes compared to Shimla and Cherapuji. In a year there is 200 cm(approx) of rain in Kiriburu. In Meghahatuburu, there is a guest house in a corner of the town.

There are no colleges in there but there are mainly two schools, Project Central School in Kiriburu and Kendriya Vidyalaya in Meghahataburu. Both are C.B.S.E boards and till class 12th and offer subjects like science, arts, and commerce (K.V). Students usually rely on school and personal coaching for study. Both the schools have big playgrounds as per city standards and allows games like cricket, football, handball and various local games.
