= South Karo River =

River in India

- Native name: ଦକ୍ଷିଣ କାରୋ ନଦୀ (Odia)

Location
- Country: India
- State: Jharkhand, Odisha

Physical characteristics
- Source
  - location: Odisha
- Mouth: South Koel River
  - coordinates: 22°29′46″N 85°13′08″E

South Karo River flows through Sundergarh and Keonjhar districts and West Singhbhum in the Indian states of Odisha and Jharkhand respectively. The river flows through industrial and iron ore mining areas and Saranda forest before joining the South Koel River in Goilkera block of West Singhbhum district. Its passage through the industrial and mining area has polluted the river water, affecting wildlife.
