= South Koel River =

South Koel River ଦକ୍ଷିଣ କୋଏଲ ନଦୀ
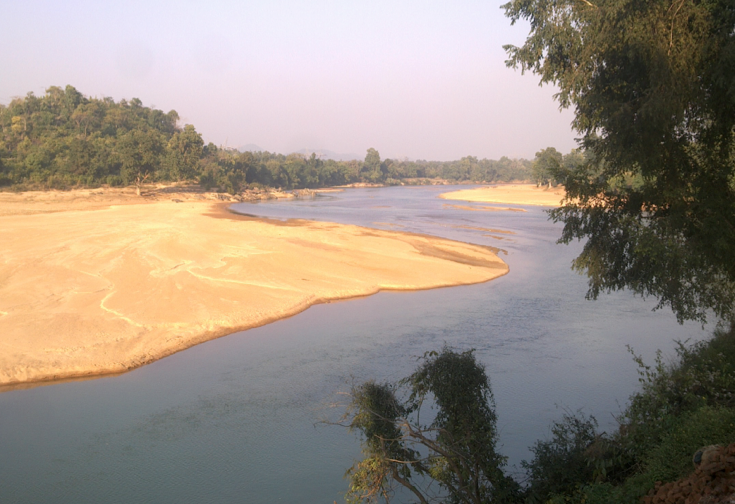
- South Koel River near Jaraikela, Odisha

Location
- Country: India
- State: Jharkhand, Odisha
- City: Rourkela

Physical characteristics
- Source
  - location: Lawapani Waterfalls, near Lohardaga, Chota Nagpur Plateau
- Mouth: Brahmani River, near Panposh, Rourkela
  - coordinates: 22°14′45″N 84°47′02″E

Basin features
- Tributaries
  - left: South Karo River
  - right: North Karo River

South Koel River (Odia: ଦକ୍ଷିଣ କୋଏଲ ନଦୀ; Hindi: दक्षिण कोयल नदी) is a 285 kilometres (177 mi) long river which runs across Jharkhand and Odisha states in India. It originates at the Lawapani Waterfalls, near Lohardaga, Chota Nagpur Plateau 82.5 kilometres (51 mi) from Ranchi, and conjoins the Belsiangar and Singbhum Rivers. The Koel is fed by three streams in Jharkhand, namely the North Karo, South Karo and Koina. The South Koel enters Odisha and joins with Sankh River at Vedavyas near Rourkela from where it is named as Brahmani.

== West Singhbhum drainage scenario ==
Singhbhum is drained by three river systems - Subarnarekha, Baitarani and Brahmani. The watersheds of these three systems originate near Gamharia in the Kolhan and radiate north-west, south-west and east respectively from their common, centre. These watersheds divide the Subarnarekha and its feeders from the Baitarani and its tributaries, and the latter again from the South Karo and Deo rivers, which feed the Brahmani through the South Koel.

The 1.521 kilometres (1 mi) long Saranda railway tunnel on the South Eastern Railway Howrah - Mumbai Main Line divides the Subarnarekha and Brahmani systems, and at this point the watershed leaves the Kolhan, continuing in a northerly direction through Porahat and finally merging in the Ranchi plateau between the Bicha and Tatkora hills. Of these three great rivers the Subarnarekha alone flows through the district. The Baitarani forms for about 12 kilometres (7 mi) the boundary between the Kolhan area and Keonjhar (in Odisha) while the Brahmani drains the west of the district through its tributary, the South Koel, and its feeders, the North Karo and the South Karo, and the latter of which in its turn is fed by the Deo river.

== Koel-Karo project ==
The Koel-Karo project is located in the Ranchi and West Singbhum districts. The 710 MW power project involves the construction of two earth dams—one 44 metres (144 ft) high, across the South Koel river near Basia, and the other 55 metres (180 ft) high, across the North Karo river near Lohajima. The two dams will be linked by a trans-basin channel, with six units of 115 MW each in the underground powerhouse at Lumpu-ngkhel and one unit of 20 MW at Raitoli. About 120 villages are to be affected, displacing over one lakh (100,000) people. About 22,000 hectares (54,000 acres) of land will be submerged. Of the total land acquisition, 12,000 hectares (30,000 acres) are reported to be agricultural land, while 10,000 hectares (25,000 acres) comprise forests. Dispute arose over the compensation package for the displaced people and protests started in 1974 and have been continuing since then. The project was finally shelved in 2003 owing to protests.
