= Sisai (disambiguation) =

Sisai refers to a village in Siwan district, in Bihar, India

It also refers to:

- Sisai, Hisar, an Indus Valley Civilisation site and a village in Haryana, India
- Sisai block, a community development block in Jharkhand, India
  - Sisai, Gumla, a village in Jharkhand, India
- Sisai (Vidhan Sabha constituency), a state assembly constituency in Jharkhand, India
