= Birsa Munda Agro Park Gumla =

Park in India

- Type: Children Park
- Location: 2GMQ+9H2, Gokul Nagar, Gumla, Jharkhand
- Status: Active
- Facilities: Outdoor gym, garden, aquarium House, play equipment for children

Birsa Munda Agro Park Gumla is a park located in Gumla, Jharkhand, India. It has a garden, an outdoor gym, aquarium house, and playing areas for children.
