= Rakesh Kumar =

Rakesh Kumar is an Indian male name and may refer to:

- Rakesh Kumar (cricketer) (born 1992), Indian cricketer
- Rakesh Kumar (kabaddi) (born 1982), Indian kabaddi player
- Rakesh Kumar (lyricist), better known as Kumaar, Indian songwriter and lyricist
- Rakesh Kumar (politician) (born 1973), Indian politician
- Rakesh Ranjan Kumar (born 1972), Indian film director and writer
- Rakesh Kumar (Paralympian) (born 1985), Indian Paralympic archer

== See also ==
- Rakesh Kumar Goswami, Indian politician
- Rakesh Kumar Jain, Indian virologist
- Rakesh Kumar Patra, Indian artistic gymnast
- Rakesh Kumar Popli or Rakesh Popli, Indian nuclear physicist
- Rakesh Kumar Raushan, Indian politician
- Rakesh Kumar Singh Bhadauria or R. K. S. Bhadauria, former Indian Chief of the Air Staff
- Rakesh Kumar Tripathi, Indian screenwriter and lyricist
- Rakesh Kumar Verma, Indian politician
- Rakesh Kumar Yadav (disambiguation)
