= Jari, Gumla =

Jari
- Village
- Location in Jharkhand, India Jari (India)
- Coordinates: 23.054324°N 84.204564°E
- Country: India
- State: Jharkhand
- District: Gumla

Government
  - Type: Federal democracy

Population (2011)
  - Total: 841

Languages *
  - Official: Hindi, Urdu
- Time zone: UTC+5:30 (IST)
- PIN: 835206
- Telephone/ STD code: 06524
- Vehicle registration: JH 07
- Literacy: 67.27%
- Lok Sabha constituency: Lohardaga
- Vidhan Sabha constituency: Gumla
- Website: gumla.nic.in

Jari is a village in the Albert Ekka (Jari) CD block in the Chainpur subdivision of the Gumla district in the Indian state of Jharkhand.

== History ==
Albert Ekka, was born in village Jari. He was posthumously awarded the Param Vir Chakra, India's highest award for valour in the face of the enemy.

== Geography ==
Cities, towns and locations in Gumla district in South Chotanagpur Division
M: municipality, CT: census town, R: rural/ urban centre, H: historical/ religious centre, T: tourist centre, B: Bauxite mining centre
Owing to space constraints in the small map, the actual locations in a larger map may vary slightly

=== Location ===
Jari is located at 23.054324°N 84.204564°E

=== Area overview ===
The map alongside presents a rugged area, consisting partly of flat-topped hills called pat and partly of an undulating plateau, in the south-western portion of Chota Nagpur Plateau. Three major rivers – the Sankh, South Koel and North Karo - along with their numerous tributaries, drain the area. The hilly area has large deposits of Bauxite. 93.7% of the population lives in rural areas.

Note: The map alongside presents some of the notable locations in the district. All places marked in the map are linked in the larger full screen map.

== Civic administration ==
There is a police station at Jari.

The headquarters of Albert Ekka (Jari) CD block are located at Jari village.

== Demographics ==
According to the 2011 Census of India, Jari had a total population of 841, of which 442 (53%) were males and 399 (47%) were females. Population in the age range 0–6 years was 123. The total number of literate persons in Jari was 483 (67.27% of the population over 6 years).

(*For language details see Albert Ekka (Jari) block#Language and religion)

== Education ==
Government High School Jari is a Hindi-medium coeducational institution established at Sisikaramtoli in 1960. It has facilities for teaching from class I to class X. The school has a play ground and a library with 1,200 books.

St. Piyush Janta High School Bhikhampur is a Hindi-medium coeducational institution established at Bhikhampur in 1965. It has facilities for teaching from class VII to class X. The school has a playground and a library with 2,200books.
