= Ghaghra =

- Census Town
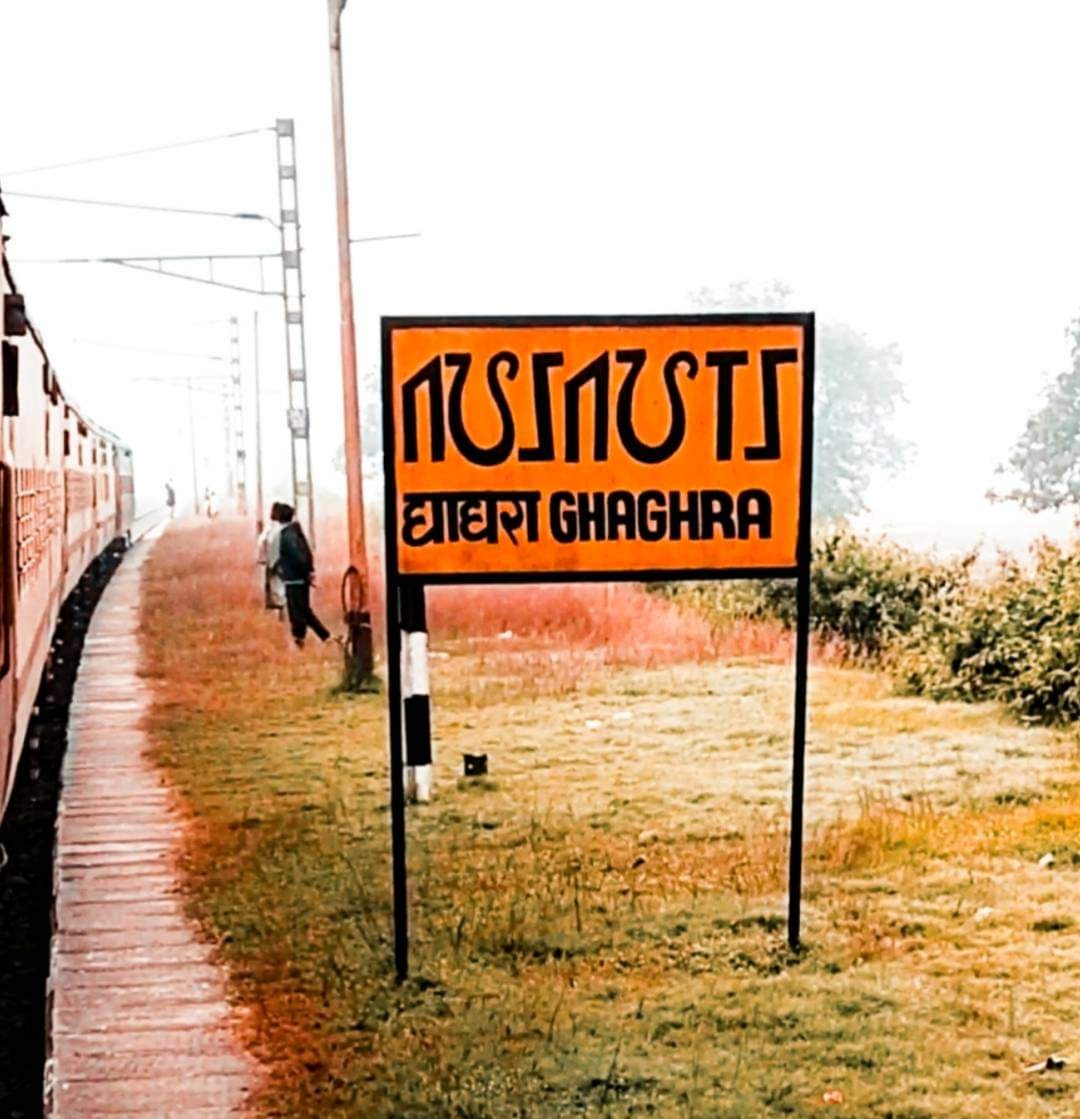
- Ghaghra Railway Station

- Location in Jharkhand, India Ghaghra (India)
- Coordinates: 23.271484°N 84.551667°E
- Country: India
- State: Jharkhand
- District: Gumla

Government
  - Type: Federal democracy

Area
  - Total: 15.91 km^{2} (6.14 sq mi)

Population (2011)
  - Total: 8,580
  - Density: 539/km^{2} (1,400/sq mi)

Languages *
  - Official: Hindi, Urdu
- Time zone: UTC+5:30 (IST)
- PIN: 835208
- Telephone/ STD code: 06524
- Vehicle registration: JH 07
- Literacy: 82.88%
- Lok Sabha constituency: Lohardaga
- Vidhan Sabha constituency: Bishunpur
- Website: gumla.nic.in

Ghaghra is a census town in the Ghaghra CD block in the Gumla subdivision of the Gumla district in the Indian state of Jharkhand.

== Geography ==
Cities, towns and locations in Gumla district in South Chotanagpur Division
M: municipality, CT: census town, R: rural/ urban centre, H: historical/ religious centre, T: tourist centre, B: Bauxite mining centre
Owing to space constraints in the small map, the actual locations in a larger map may vary slightly

=== Location ===
Ghaghra is located at 23.271484°N 84.551667°E

=== Area overview ===
The map alongside presents a rugged area, consisting partly of flat-topped hills called pat and partly of an undulating plateau, in the south-western portion of Chota Nagpur Plateau. Three major rivers – the Sankh, South Koel and North Karo - along with their numerous tributaries, drain the area. The hilly area has large deposits of Bauxite. 93.7% of the population lives in rural areas.

Note: The map alongside presents some of the notable locations in the district. All places marked in the map are linked in the larger full screen map.

== Civic administration ==
There is a police station at Ghaghra.

The headquarters of Ghaghra CD block are located at Ghaghra town.

== Infrastructure ==
According to the District Census Handbook 2011, Gumla, Ghaghra covered an area of 15.91 km^{2} (6.14 sq mi). Among the civic amenities, it had 103 km (64 mi) of roads with both closed and open drains, the protected water supply involved uncovered well, hand pump. It had 1,150 domestic electric connections. Among the educational facilities it had 10 primary schools, 6 middle schools, 1 secondary school, 1 senior secondary school, 1 general degree college. It had the branch offices of 1 nationalised bank, 1 private commercial bank, 1 cooperative bank, 1 agricultural credit society.

== Demographics ==
According to the 2011 Census of India, Ghaghra had a total population of 8,580, of which 4,294 (50%) were males and 4,286 (50%) were females. Population in the age range 0–6 years was 1,280. The total number of literate persons in Ghaghra was 6,050 (82.88% of the population over 6 years).

(*For language details see Ghaghra block#Language and religion)

== Education ==
Tana Bhagat Inter College Ghaghra is a Hindi-medium coeducational institution established in 1976. It has facilities for teaching in classes XI and XII.

S.S. High School Ghaghra is a Hindi-medium coeducational institution established in 1956. It has facilities for teaching from class IX to class XII. It has a playground and a library with 1,485 books.

Project Girls High School Ghaghra is a Hindi-medium girls only institution established in 1983. It has facilities for teaching from class VI to class X. The school has a playground, a library with 60 books and has 2 computers for teaching and learning purposes.
