= Pokla =

- Township
- Location in Jharkhand, India Pokla (India)
- Coordinates: 22.800109°N 84.9474203°E
- Country: India
- State: Jharkhand
- District: Gumla
- Elevation: 675 m (2,215 ft)

Population (2001)
  - Total: 15,400

Languages
  - Official: Hindi
- Time zone: UTC+5:30 (IST)
- Postal code: 835227
- Telephone code: 06528
- Vehicle registration: JH
- Sex Ratio: 1094:1000 ♂/♀

Pokla is a small village/hamlet in Kamdara block in Gumla District of Jharkhand State, India. It is located south of District headquarters Gumla and 35 km from State capital Ranchi.
