= Ghaghra block =

Ghaghra
- Community development block
- Coordinates: 23.271484°N 84.551667°E
- Country: India
- State: Jharkhand
- District: Gumla

Government
  - Type: Federal democracy

Area
  - Total: 544.67 km^{2} (210.30 sq mi)

Population (2011)
  - Total: 114,399
  - Density: 210.03/km^{2} (543.98/sq mi)

Languages
  - Official: Hindi, Urdu
- Time zone: UTC+5:30 (IST)
- PIN: 835208
- Telephone/STD code: 06523
- Vehicle registration: JH 07
- Literacy: 57.56%
- Lok Sabha constituency: Lohardaga
- Vidhan Sabha constituency: Bishunpur
- Website: gumla.nic.in

Ghaghra block is a CD block that forms an administrative division in the Gumla subdivision of Gumla district, in the Indian state of Jharkhand.

== History ==
Gumla became a subdivision of Ranchi district in 1902 and it became a separate district in 1983. Simdega district was carved out of Gumla district in 2011. Subsequently, Gumla district was divided into three subdivisions – Gumla Sadar subdivision (with Gumla, Ghaghra, Bharno, Bishunpur, Raidih and Sisia blocks) and Basia subdivision (with Palkot, Basia and Kamdara blocks), and Chainpur subdivision (with Chainpur, Albert Ekka (Jari) and Dumri blocks).

== Maoist activities ==
The Maoist insurgency started spreading around the mid-1990s and poses a big challenge to peace and development of the district. It “is involved in abduction, extortion, extortion killings.” The banned organisation is active largely in the eastern part of the district mainly in Kamadara, Basia, Palkot, Gumla, Raidih, Sisai and Bharno police stations. In order to counter the activities of the insurgents, arms, ammunition and security equipment have been provided in every police station. It includes bullet-proof and landmine-proof vehicles.

== Geography ==
In the southern portion of Gumla district, there are flat topped hills called pat, with an elevation ranging from 2,500 feet to 3,000 feet. The pat region is spread across Bishunpur, Chainpur and Ghaghra CD blocks. The highest areas are Netarhat pat (3,356 ft), Lamiti pat (3,777 ft) and Galgat pat (3,823 ft). The rest of the district occupies a part of the Ranchi Plateau with an average elevation of 2,300 feet.

Three major rivers flowing through Gumla district are North Koel River, South Koel River and Sankh River.

Ghaghra CD block is bounded by Senha CD block in Lohardaga district on the north, Sisiai CD block on the east, Gumla and Chainpur block, Gumla CD blocks on the south, and Bishunpur CD block on the west.

Ghaghra CD block has an area of 544.67 km^{2}.Ghaghra police station serves Ghaghra CD block. The headquarters of Ghaghra CD block is located at Ghaghra town.

== Demographics ==
=== Population ===
According to the 2011 Census of India, Ghaghra CD block had a total population of 114,399, of which 105,819 were rural and 8,580 were urban. There were 57,147 (50%) males and 57,252 (50%) females. Population in the age range 0–6 years was 20,906. Scheduled Castes numbered 2,102 (1.84%) and Scheduled Tribes numbered 88,805 (77.63%).

The only census town in Ghaghra CD block is (2011 population figure in brackets): Ghaghra (8,580).

=== Literacy ===
According to the 2011 census, the total number of literate persons in Ghaghra CD block was 53,815 (57.56% of the population over 6 years) out of which males numbered 31,975 (68.76% of the male population over 6 years) and females numbered 21,840 (46.48% of the female population over 6 years). The gender disparity (the difference between female and male literacy rates) was 22.29%.

As of the 2011 census, literacy in Gumla district was 66.92%. Literacy in Jharkhand was 67.63% in 2011. Literacy in India in 2011 was 74.04%.

See also – List of Jharkhand districts ranked by literacy rate

Literacy in CD Blocks of
Gumla district
Gumla Sadar subdivision
Gumla – 72.28%
Ghaghra – 57.56%
Bharno – 58.24%
Bishunpur – 57.95%
Raidih – 68.98%
Sisai – 63.06%
Basia subdivision
Palkot – 61.55
Kamdara – 68.51%
Basia – 67.66%
Chainpur subdivision
Chainpur –71.22%
Dumri – 69.83%
Albert Ekka (Jari) –71.43%
Source: 2011 Census: CD block Wise
Primary Census Abstract Data

=== Language and religion ===
Religions in Ghaghra block (2011)
Religion	Percent
Sarna	71.81%
Hinduism	22.02%
Christianity	3.85%
Islam	2.05%
Other or not stated	0.27%

According to the Population by Religious Communities 2011 data, in the Ghaghra subdistrict, ‘Other religious communities’ numbered 82,151 and formed 71.81% of the population, followed by (number of persons and percentage of population in brackets) Hindus (25,191/ 22.02%), Christians (4,400/ 3.85%), Muslims (2,346/ 2.05%), and persons who did not state their religion (311/ 0.09%) ).

Scheduled Tribes numbered 706,754 and formed 68.94% of the total population of Gumla district. Within the scheduled tribes the more populous tribes were (percentage of ST population in 2011 in brackets): Oraon, Dhangars (62.63%), Munda, Patars (11.70%), Kharia, Dhelki Kharia, Dudh Kharia, Hill Kharia (9.07%), Lohras (5.77%) and Chik Baraik (2.57%).

Languages in Ghaghra block (2011)
1. Kurukh (48.7%)
2. Sadri (40.8%)
3. Hindi (7.02%)
4. Mundari (1.08%)
5. Others (2.40%)

According to the Population by Mother Tongue 2011 data, in the Ghaghra subdistrict, Kurukh was the mother-tongue of 55,710 persons forming 48.69% of the population, followed by (number of persons and percentage of population in brackets) Hindi (54,711/ 47.82%), Mundari (1,175/ 1.03%), Kharia (431/ 0.38%), and persons with other languages as mother-tongue (2,385/ 2.08%). Persons with Hindi as mother-tongue included 15,328 persons having Sadri/ Sadan, 31,285 persons having Nagpuri as mother-tongue.

Note: An attempt has been made to include all language groups each with at least 300 persons as their mother-tongue and only those groups with less than 300 persons as their mother-tongue in the census data are normally included in the “other languages” category. Comparatively smaller language groups with 200+ persons as their mother-tongue are mentioned in the text. Many languages have sub-groups. Those who are interested can see the reference for more details. The census data for this page has a large amount for “other languages”, without any information.

Hindi is the official language in Jharkhand and Urdu has been declared as an additional official language.

== Economy ==
=== Overview ===
80% and over of the population of Gumla district were in the BPL category in 2004–2005. In 2011-12, the proportion of BPL population in Gumla district came down to 36.75%. According to a study in 2013 (modified in 2019), "the incidence of poverty in Jharkhand is estimated at 46%, but 60% of the scheduled castes and scheduled tribes are still below poverty line."

=== Livelihood ===
Livelihood
in Ghaghra CD block
1. Cultivators (74.8%)
2. Agricultural labourers (15.5%)
3. Household industries (2.06%)
4. Other Workers (7.58%)

In Ghaghra CD block in 2011, amongst the class of total workers, cultivators numbered 42,113 and formed 74.85%, agricultural labourers numbered 8,730 and formed 15.52%, household industry workers numbered 1,158 and formed 2.06% and other workers numbered 4,264 and formed 7.58%. Total workers numbered 56,265 and formed 49.18% of the total population, and non-workers numbered 58,134 and formed 50.82% of the population.

=== Infrastructure ===
There are 119 inhabited villages in Ghaghra CD block. In 2011, 21 villages had a power supply. 2 villages had tap water (treated/ untreated), 119 villages had well water (covered/ uncovered), 114 villages had hand pumps, and all villages have drinking water facility. 13 villages had post offices, 16 villages had sub post offices, 5 villages had telephones (land lines), 51 villages had mobile phone coverage. 119 villages had pucca (paved) village roads, 16 villages had bus service (public/ private), 14 villages had autos/ modified autos, 7 villages had taxi/vans, 20 villages had tractors. 5 villages had bank branches, 4 villages had agricultural credit societies, 48 villages had public distribution system, 16 villages had assembly polling stations.

=== Agriculture ===
In Gumla district, only three CD blocks, namely Sisai, Bharno and Kamdara, have plain lands. Rest of the district is mostly undulating in nature. Forests cover around 27% of the total area. About 35% of the total geographical area of the district is under cultivation. Out of 3.296 lakh hectares of cultivable lands, only 22,056 hectares of land are under assured irrigation coverage. “The main economy of the village depends upon agriculture, forest produce, cattle development, and other labour activities...” About 70% farmers belong to the small and marginal category and have small plots scattered all around. Percentages of landless farmers are negligible.

=== Bauxite mining ===
Bauxite and laterite (aluminium ore) are found in the villages of Amtipani, Langdatanr, Chirodih, Jalim, Narma, Bahagara and Gurdari of Bishunpur block, Langatanr, Lupungpat and Chota-agiatu in Chainpur block and Hanrup, Serangdag and Jalim in Ghaghra block. There are 21 bauxite mines in total.

=== Backward Regions Grant Fund ===
Gumla district is listed as a backward region and receives financial support from the Backward Regions Grant Fund. The fund, created by the Government of India, is designed to redress regional imbalances in development. As of 2012, 272 districts across the country were listed under this scheme. The list includes 21 districts of Jharkhand.

== Education ==
Ghaghra CD block had 30 villages with pre-primary schools, 111 villages with primary schools, 39 villages with middle schools, 7 villages with secondary schools, 2 villages with senior secondary schools, 7 villages had no educational facility.
.*Senior secondary schools are also known as inter colleges in Jharkhand

== Healthcare ==
Ghaghra CD block had 4 villages with primary health centres, 23 villages with primary health subcentres, 14 villages with maternity and child welfare centres, 2 villages with allopathic hospitals, 2 villages with dispensaries, 2 villages with veterinary hospitals, 4 villages with family welfare centres.
.*Private medical practitioners, alternative medicine etc. not included
