= Rakesh Kumar Yadav =

Rakesh Kumar Yadav is an Indian male name and may refer to:

- Rakesh Kumar Yadav (athlete), Indian hammer thrower
- Rakesh Kumar Yadav (politician), Indian politician, member of the Uttar Pradesh Legislative Assembly

== See also ==
- Rakesh Kumar (disambiguation)
- Rakesh Yadav, Indian cardiologist
