= Albert Ekka =

Param Veer Chakra awardee

Lance Naik Albert Ekka PVC
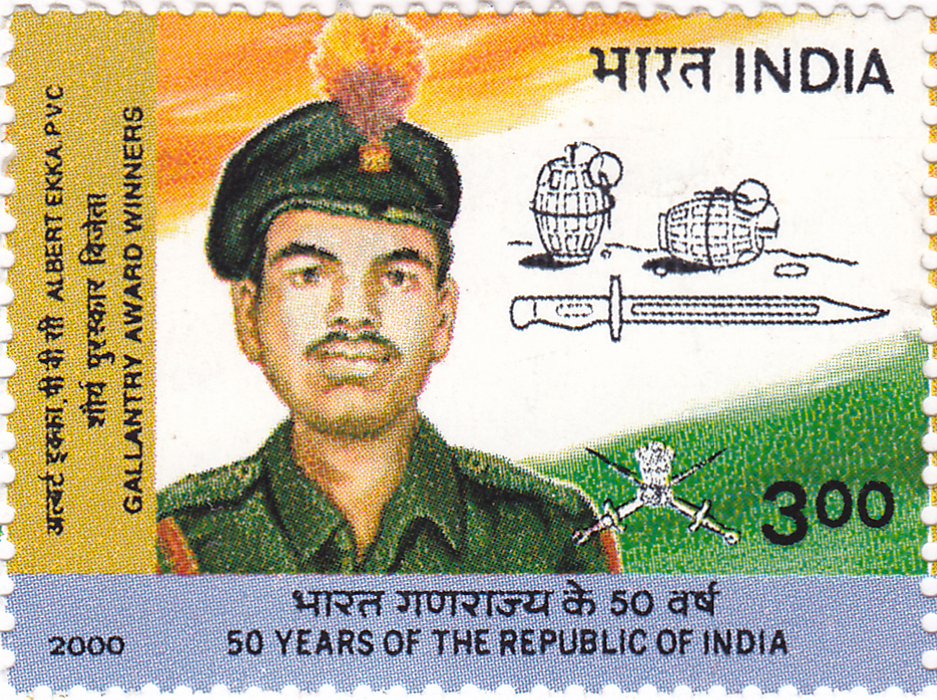
- Albert Ekka on a 2000 stamp of India
- Born: 27 December 1942; Village-Jari, Ranchi district, Bihar Province, British India, (present day Gumla district, Jharkhand), India
- Died: 3 December 1971 (aged 28); Gangasagar, Bangladesh
- Spouse: Balamdine Ekka
- Military career
- Allegiance: India
- Branch: Indian Army
- Service years: 1962–1971
- Rank: Lance Naik
- Unit: 14 GUARDS
- Conflicts: Indo-Pakistan War of 1971; Battle of Hilli
- Awards: Param Vir Chakra

Lance Naik Albert Ekka, PVC (27 December 1942 – 3 December 1971) was an Indian soldier. He was killed in action in the Battle of Gangasagar, during the Indo-Pakistan War of 1971. He was posthumously awarded India's highest military award, the Param Vir Chakra, for his valour in the face of the enemy.

== Early life ==
Albert Ekka was born on 27 December 1942 into a Christian Kurukh family in the village of Zari, in the erstwhile Ranchi district of Bihar Province, now part of Gumla district in Jharkhand. His parents were Julius Ekka and Mariam Ekka. Hunting was a common sport among his community, and Ekka was interested in it from his childhood. With his experience of hunting in jungles, he was able to be a better soldier with his skilful use of ground and movements. As he grew, Ekka developed interest for the army, and was enrolled in the Bihar Regiment on 27 December 1962.

== Military career ==
After the 14th Battalion of the Brigade of the Guards was raised in January 1968, Ekka was transferred to that unit. He saw action in counter-insurgency operations while in the North East. During the preparations anticipation of Indo-Pakistani War of 1971, Ekka was promoted to Lance Naik.

=== Battle of Gangasagar ===
As the war broke out, 14 Guards was attached to the IV Corps. Gangasagar, located 6 kilometres (3.7 mi) to the south of the border town of Akhaura in erstwhile Comilla district of Bangladesh, was crucial for the advancement of IV Corps, and 14 Guards was tasked with its capture. As the operation began, the unit placed itself south of Gangasagar, about 4 kilometres (2.5 mi) from Akhaura railway station, and formed its defences. The high ground around the railway station was their main defence, followed by anti-tank and anti-personnel mines. Pakistani positions were well entrenched here. During a patrol, Pakistani troops were found moving on the railway tracks. Soon two companies of the battalion attacked the enemy positions along the track.

== Citation ==
The Param Vir Chakra citation on the Official Indian Army Website reads as follows:

Lance Naik Albert Ekka was in the left forward company of a battalion of the Brigade of Guards during their attack on the enemy defences at Gangasagar on the Eastern front. This was a well-fortified position held in strength by the enemy. The assaulting troops were subjected to intense shelling and heavy small-arms fire, but they charged onto the objective and were locked in bitter hand-to-hand combat. Lance Naik Albert Ekka noticed an enemy light machine-gun (LMG) inflicting heavy casualties on his company. With complete disregard for his personal safety, he charged the enemy bunker, bayoneted two enemy soldiers and silenced the LMG. Though seriously wounded in this encounter, he continued to fight alongside his comrades through the mile deep objective, clearing bunker after bunker with undaunted courage. Towards the northern end of the objective one enemy medium machine-gun (MMG) opened up from the second storey of a well-fortified building inflicting heavy casualties and holding up the attack. Once again this gallant soldier, without a thought for his personal safety, despite his serious injury and the heavy volume of enemy fire, crawled forward till he reached the building and lobbed a grenade into the bunker killing one enemy soldier and injuring the other. The MMG however continued to fire. With outstanding courage and determination Lance Naik Albert Ekka scaled a side wall and entering the bunker, bayoneted the enemy soldier who was still firing and thus silenced the machine-gun, saving further casualties to his company and ensuring the success of the attack. In this process however, he received serious injuries and succumbed to them after the capture of the objective. In this action, Lance Naik Albert Ekka displayed the most conspicuous valour and determination and made the supreme sacrifice in the best traditions of the Army.

== Legacy ==
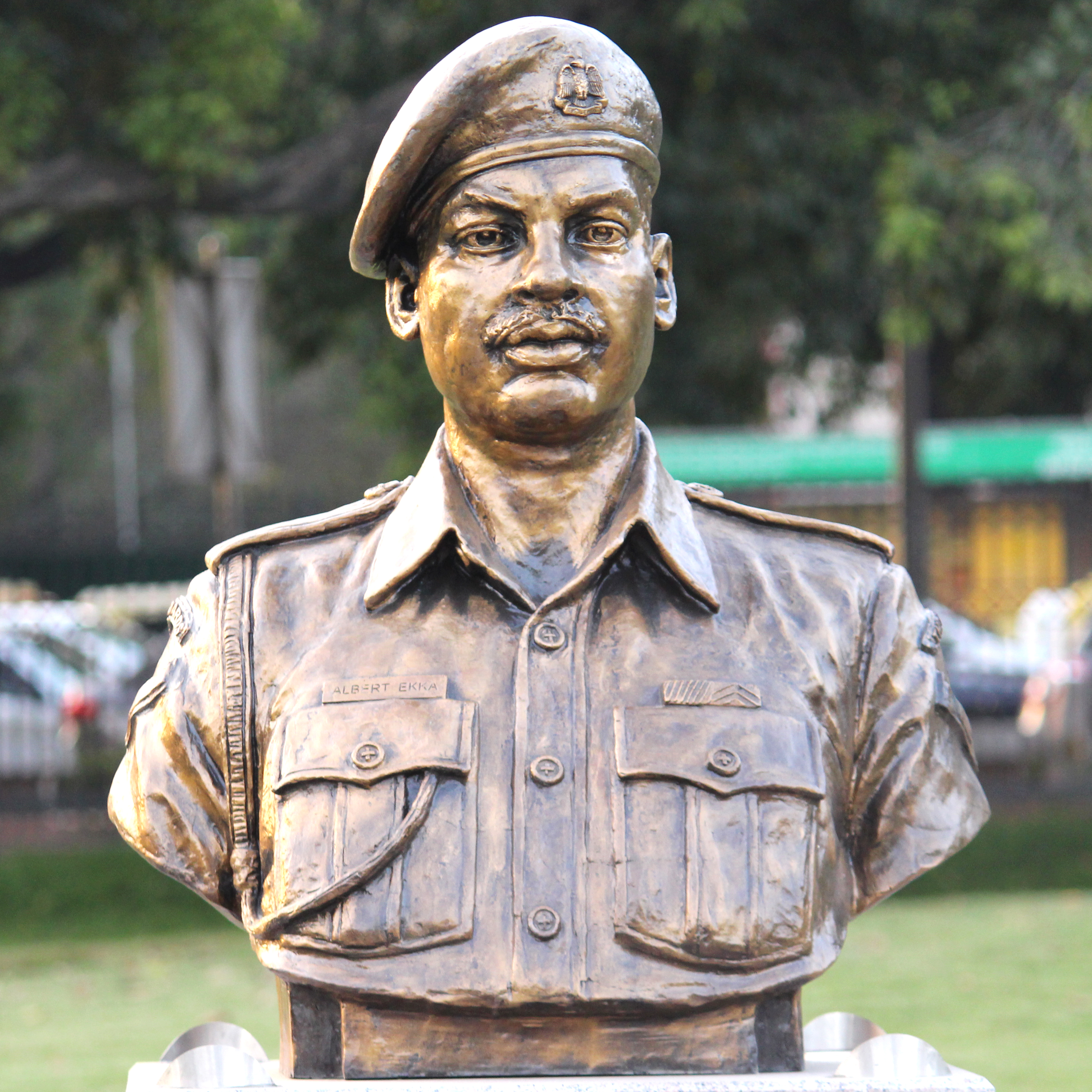
Ekka's bust at Param Yodha Sthal, National War Memorial, New Delhi

Lance-Naik Albert Ekka was posthumously awarded India's highest wartime gallantry award, the Param Vir Chakra. In 2000, on the occasion of 50th Republic day, the Government of India issued a postal stamp in his memory. A native of present-day Jharkhand, he was honoured by naming the major intersection in front of Firayalal store in Ranchi as Albert Ekka Chowk, which also bears his statue. A block (sub-district) in Gumla has also been created in his name - Albert Ekka (Jari) block. There is an eco park in Tripura named after him (Albert Ekka Park) for his action to save Agartala from Pakistan during 1971 Indo-Pak war. There is a sports stadium named after him at Kamptee cantonment(Nagpur District, Maharashtra).
