= Gumla subdivision =

- Subdivision
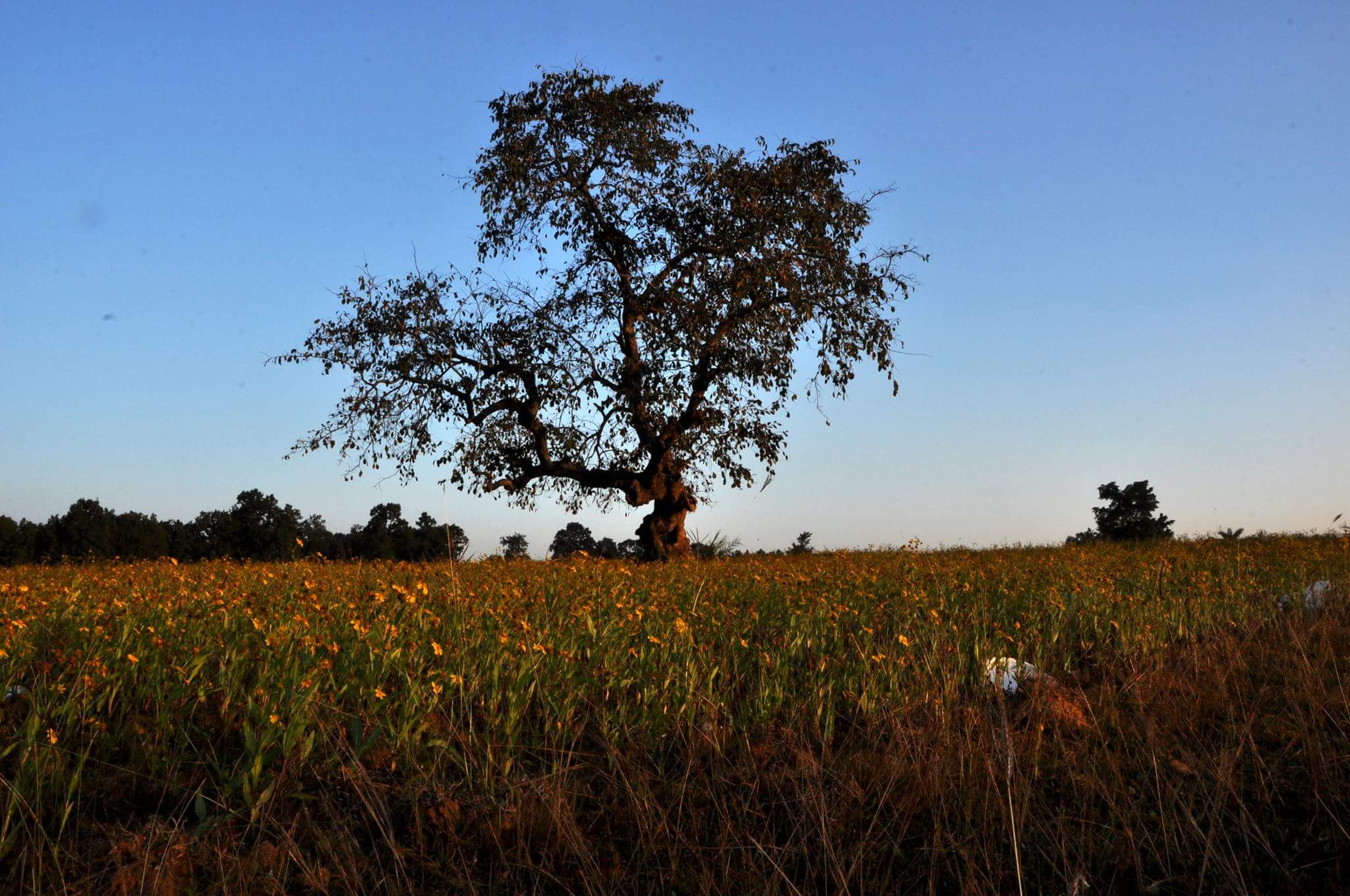
- Gumla landscape

- Location in Jharkhand, India Gumla subdivision (India)
- Coordinates: 22.044444°N 84.541667°E
- Country: India
- State: Jharkhand
- District: Gumla
- Established: 1902
- Headquarters: Gumla

Area
  - Total: 2,930.76 km^{2} (1,131.57 sq mi)

Population (2011)
  - Total: 663,197
  - Density: 226.288/km^{2} (586.084/sq mi)

Languages
  - Official: Hindi, Urdu, Sadri, Kurukh
- Time zone: UTC+5:30 (IST)
- Website: gumla.nic.in

Gumla subdivision is an administrative subdivision of the Gumla district in the South Chotanagpur division in the state of Jharkhand, India.

== History ==
Gumla was made a subdivision of Ranchi district in 1902 and it was made a subdivision of Gumla district in 1983 when the latter was made a district.

As of 2022, Gumla district is divided into three subdivisions – Gumla subdivision (with Gumla, Ghaghra, Bharno, Bishunpur, Raidih and Sisai blocks), Basia subdivision (with Palkot, Basia and Kamdara blocks), and Chainpur subdivision (with Chainpur, Albert Ekka (Jari) and Dumri blocks).

== Overview ==
The subdivisions of Gumla district have the following distinctions:

Subdivision	Headquarters	Area km^{2}	Population (2011)	Rural population % (2011)	Urban population % (2011)
Gumla	Gumla	2,930.76	663,197	90.19	9.81
Chainpur	Chainpur	1,053.50	136,651	100	0
Basia	Basia	1,343.43	225,365	100	0

Note: Calculated on the basis of block-wise data available.

Cities, towns and locations in Gumla district in South Chotanagpur Division
M: municipality, CT: census town, R: rural/ urban centre, H: historical/ religious centre, T: tourist centre, B: Bauxite mining centre
Owing to space constraints in the small map, the actual locations in a larger map may vary slightly

== Police stations ==
Police stations in the Gumla subdivision are at:

1. Gumla
2. Ghaghra
3. Bharno
4. Bishunpur
5. Raidih
6. Sisai
7. Gurdari

== Blocks ==
Community development blocks in the Gumla subdivision are:

CD Block	Headquarters	Area km^{2}	Population (2011)	SC %	ST %	Literacy rate %	CT
Gumla	Gumla	528.77	162,356	3.84	64.29	66.56	Toto
Ghaghra	Ghaghra	544.67	114,399	1.84	77.63	57.56	Ghaghra
Bharno	Bharno	299.87	84,572	1.53	73.83	66.92	-
Bishunpur	Bishunpur	609.47	62,319	1.64	89.94	57.95	-
Raidih	Raidih	514.13	71,443	2.99	64.72	68.98	-
Sisai	Sisai	425.96	116,844	1.04	64.37	63.06	-

== Education ==
In 2011, in the Gumla subdivision out of a total 511 inhabited villages in 6 CD blocks there were 155 villages with pre-primary schools, 490 villages with primary schools, 244 villages with middle schools, 63 villages with secondary schools, 22 villages with senior secondary schools, 1 village with general degree college, 21 villages with no educational facility.

The only nagar panchayat had 10 primary schools, 9 middle schools, 6 secondary schools, 5 senior secondary schools, 1 general degree college, 2 recognised shorthand, typewriting, and vocational training institutions and 1 non-formal education centre (Sarba Shiksha Abhiyan).
.*Senior secondary schools are also known as Inter colleges in Jharkhand.

=== Educational institutions ===
The following institutions are located in Gumla subdivision:

- Kartik Oraon College was established at Gumla in 1960.
- B.N.J. College, also known as Baijnath Jalan College, was established at Sisai in 1976.

(Information about degree colleges with proper reference may be added here)

== Healthcare ==
In 2011, in the Gumla subdivision, in the 6 CD blocks, there were 22 villages with primary health centres, 145 villages with primary health subcentres, 51 villages with maternity and child welfare centres, 21 villages with allopathic hospitals, 14 villages with dispensaries, 6 villages with veterinary hospitals, 15 villages with family welfare centres, 8 villages with medicine shops.

The only nagar panchayat had 2 hospitals, 1 nursing home, 1 charitable hospital/ nursing home, 2 dispensaries, 2 health centres, 8 maternity and child welfare centres, 1 maternity home, 1 family welfare centre, 11 veterinary hospitals, 11 medicine shops.
.*Private medical practitioners, alternative medicine etc. not included

=== Medical facilities ===
(Anybody having referenced information about location of government/ private medical facilities may please add it here)
