= Sisai, Gumla =

Sisai
- Village
- Location in Jharkhand, India Sisai (India)
- Coordinates: 23.169324°N 84.760267°E
- Country: India
- State: Jharkhand
- District: Gumla

Government
  - Type: Federal democracy

Population (2011)
  - Total: 10,075

Languages *
  - Official: Hindi, Urdu
- Time zone: UTC+5:30 (IST)
- PIN: 835324
- Telephone/ STD code: 06523
- Vehicle registration: JH 07
- Literacy: 78.37%
- Lok Sabha constituency: Lohardaga
- Vidhan Sabha constituency: Sisai
- Website: gumla.nic.in

Sisai is a village in the Sisai CD block in the Gumla subdivision of the Gumla district in the Indian state of Jharkhand.

== Geography ==
Cities, towns and locations in Gumla district in South Chotanagpur Division
M: municipality, CT: census town, R: rural/ urban centre, H: historical/ religious centre, T: tourist centre, B: Bauxite mining centre
Owing to space constraints in the small map, the actual locations in a larger map may vary slightly

=== Location ===
Sisai is located at 23.169324°N 84.760267°E

=== Area overview ===
The map alongside presents a rugged area, consisting partly of flat-topped hills called pat and partly of an undulating plateau, in the south-western portion of Chota Nagpur Plateau. Three major rivers – the Sankh, South Koel and North Karo - along with their numerous tributaries, drain the area. The hilly area has large deposits of Bauxite. 93.7% of the population lives in rural areas.

Note: The map alongside presents some of the notable locations in the district. All places marked in the map are linked in the larger full screen map.

== Civic administration ==
There is a police station at Sisai.

The headquarters of Sisai CD block are located at Sisai village.

== Demographics ==
According to the 2011 Census of India, Sisai had a total population of 10,075, of which 5,084 (50%) were males and 4,991 (50%) were females. Population in the age range 0–6 years was 1,531. The total number of literate persons in Sisai was 6,696 (78.37% of the population over 6 years).

(*For language details see Sisai block#Language and religion)

== Education ==
B.N.J. College, also known as Baijnath Jalan College, established in 1976, is affiliated with Ranchi University.

Rajyakrit High School Sisai is a Hindi-medium coeducational institution established in 1971. It has facilities for teaching from class I to class X. It has a playground, a library with 1,761 books and has 7 computers for teaching and learning purposes.

Ashram Awasiya Balika High School Sisai is a Hindi-medium girls only institution established in 2006.It has facilities for teaching from Class VI to Class X. The school has a library with 500 books.
