= Rakesh Popli =

Indian nuclear physicist

Rakesh Kumar Popli
- Rakesh Popli
- Born: 1952
- Died: 15 September 2007 (aged 54–55)
- Occupation: Nuclear physicist
- Known for: Establishing the first "Ekal Vidyalayas"

Rakesh Kumar Popli (1952 – 15 September 2007) was an Indian nuclear physicist who would establish the first Ekal Vidyalayas, or One-Teacher Schools, in remote regions of India.

== Early years ==
Rakesh Popli was born in India in 1952.

He studied in the United States at Purdue University, from 1974 to 1981, obtaining his doctorate in nuclear physics.

Returning to India, he was accepted as an assistant professor of nuclear physics at the Indian Institute of Technology Kanpur. He would later be appointed as a professor of applied physics at the Birla Institute of Technology, Mesra (BIT Mesra) in Ranchi, Jharkhand, from 1984 to 1988.

== Ekal vidyalayas ==
In 1986, following in the footsteps of the early followers of Swami Vivekananda, some young educationists began to work with tribal people who lived in the dense forests of Jharkhand. Sri Bhao Rao Devras had outlined the concept of One Teacher Schools in 1986. Rakesh Popli and his wife Rama Popli, an expert in child education, then refined the concept. He wrote the syllabus for the pioneering schools that were established among the tribes of Gumla, about 125 kilometres (78 mi) away from BIT Mesra. Sponsored by the India Development Service, a charity, in July/August 1986, Rakesh Popli visited about twenty cities in the United States where he described the work of his group in the tribal areas.

Rakesh Popli died from blood cancer on September 15, 2007 after a protracted illness. His books included A Stroll Through Space Time (in Hindi).

== Partial bibliography ==
- Rakesh Kumar Popli (1976). UV degradation of polymers. University of Louisville. p. 146.
- Rakesh K. Popli, David K. Roylance (1980). Molecular Fraction Behavior in Oriented Polymers. Defense Technical Information Center. p. 136.
- Lilavati Krishnan; B. N. Patnaik; N. K. Sharma; Indian Institute of Technology Kanpur (1989). Aspects of human communication. Mittal Publications. ISBN 81-7099-185-4. (contributor)
- Rakesh Kumar Popli (2003). A stroll through space-time: a leisurely discourse on Einstein's relativity theory. Vigyan Prasar. p. 91. ISBN 81-7480-085-9.
- Rakesh Popli. Parmanu Se Sitaro Tak. Vigyan Prasar. ISBN 81-7480-038-7.
