= Gumla =

- City
- Gumla Village area
- Interactive map of Gumla
- Location in Jharkhand, India Gumla (India)
- Coordinates: 23°2′40″N 84°32′30″E
- Country: India
- State: Jharkhand
- District: Gumla

Area
  - Total: 7.89 km^{2} (3.05 sq mi)
- Elevation: 652 m (2,139 ft)

Population (2011)
  - Total: 51,264
  - Density: 197/km^{2} (510/sq mi)

Languages *
  - Official: Hindi, Urdu
  - Regional: Nagpuri, Kurukh, Mundari
- Time zone: UTC+5:30 (IST)
- PIN: 835207
- Telephone code: 06524
- Vehicle registration: JH-07
- Website: www.gumla.nic.in

Gumla is a city which is the district headquarters in the Gumla subdivision of the Gumla district in the state of Jharkhand, India.

== History ==
Gumla began as a hamlet. A week-long "Cow Fair" (Gau-Mela) took place every year, where items in daily use (utensils, ornaments, grain and sometimes cattle) were sold or bartered. Since these items were only available at the fair, people would keep lists during the year of what they needed. The hamlet's population grew, and it became a village named "Gumla" (a derivative of Gau–Mela).

During the medieval era, the Chhotanagpur region was ruled by the kings of the Nagvanshi dynasty and Baraik Devenandan Singh ruled the Gumla region.

During British rule in India Gumla was in Lohardaga district, and in 1800 there was a revolt against the Raj. In 1807, the Oraons of Barway (west of Gumla) murdered their landlord from Srinagar, and the uprising spread throughout Gumla. In 1818, Bakhtar Say reportedly played a prominent role. In 1843, Gumla became part of Bishunpur province. The province, which was abolished in 1899, was later named Ranchi; in 1902, Gumla became a subdivision of Ranchi district.

Ganga Maharaj, who built the Kali Temple at Sri Ramnagar, was active in the Quit India Movement in 1942; for his contribution to Indian independence, he received a pension from the government.

On 18 May 1983 Gumla District was established by Bihar Chief Minister Jagannath Mishra. Dwarika Nath Sinha was appointed the first deputy commissioner of the new district.

== Geography ==
Cities, towns and locations in Gumla district in South Chotanagpur Division
M: municipality, CT: census town, R: rural/ urban centre, H: historical/ religious centre, T: tourist centre, B: Bauxite mining centre
Owing to space constraints in the small map, the actual locations in a larger map may vary slightly

=== Location ===
Gumla is in the southern part of the Chota Nagpur Plateau, which forms the eastern edge of the Deccan Plateau.

=== Climate ===
Gumla has a temperate, sub-tropical climate, with an average high of 40 °C (104 °F) in summer and an average low of 3 °C (37 °F) in winter. Average annual rainfall is about 1,450 millimetres (57 inches).

=== Area overview ===
The map alongside presents a rugged area, consisting partly of flat-topped hills called pat and partly of an undulating plateau, in the south-western portion of Chota Nagpur Plateau. Three major rivers – the Sankh, South Koel and North Karo - along with their numerous tributaries, drain the area. The hilly area has large deposits of Bauxite. 93.7% of the population lives in rural areas.

Note: The map alongside presents some of the notable locations in the district. All places marked in the map are linked in the larger full screen map.

== Infrastructure ==
According to the District Census Handbook 2011, Gumla, Gumla covered an area of 7.89 km^{2} (3.05 sq mi). Among the civic amenities, it had 37.5 km (23.3 mi) of roads with both closed and open drains, the protected water supply involved uncovered well, tap water from treated sources, overhead tank. It had 7,747 domestic electric connections, 649 road lighting points. Among the medical facilities, it had 2 hospitals (with 100 beds), 2 dispensaries, 2 health centres, 1 family welfare centre, 8 maternity and child welfare centres, 1 maternity home, 1 nursing home, 1 charitable hospital/ nursing home, 11 veterinary hospitals, 20 medicine shops. Among the educational facilities it had 10 primary schools, 9 middle schools, 6 secondary schools, 5 senior secondary schools, 1 general degree college. It had 2 recognised short hand, type writing and vocational training institutions, 1 non-formal education centre (Sarva Shiksha Abhiyan). Among the social, cultural and recreational facilities it had 1 orphanage home, 1 working women's hostel, 1 old age home, 3 stadiums, 1 cinema theatre, 3 auditorium/ community halls, 1 public library, 1 reading room. Important commodities it produced were detergent, timber, steel items (gate, grill). It had the branch offices of 9 nationalised banks, 1 private commercial bank, 1 cooperative bank, 4 agricultural credit societies, 3 non-agricultural credit societies.

== Demographics ==
According to the 2011 Census of India, Gumla had a total population of 51,264, of which 26,252 (51%) were males and 25,012 (49%) were females. Population in the age range 0–6 years was 6,373. The total number of literate persons in Gumla was 40,101 (89.33% of the population over 6 years).

Hindus were 45.93% of the population, while Muslims were 20.35%. Christians were 18.26% and other religions (mainly Sarna) were 14.95%. At the time of the 2011 census, 51.74% of the population spoke Hindi, 14.96% Sadri, 14.57% Kurukh and 12.55% Urdu as their first language.

As of 2001, Gumla had a population of 39,790, with males constituting 52 percent and females 48 percent. Gumla had an average literacy rate of 75 percent, higher than the national average of 59.5 percent: male literacy was 80 percent, and female literacy 70 percent. Fifteen percent of the population was under six years of age.

== Transport ==
=== Roads ===
Gumla is connected to Ranchi and Simdega via NH–43. It is connected via State Highways to Lohardaga, Latehar, Daltonganj and other major towns of the State.

It is connected to the State of Chhattisgarh via NH-78.

Union Minister of Road Transport, Highways and Shipping, Nitin Gadkari will soon lay the foundation of the much awaited Gumla bypass project. A total 12.6-kilometre-long (7.8 mi) road shall connect Silam village on NH-78 under Raidih block to Dhodhra village in Gumla block on NH - 23. The work is expected to start by 2018.

=== Railways ===
Pokla railway station is the only Indian Railways station in the District of Gumla, the other stations in proximity being Bano, Govindpur Road, Tori, Latehar, Orga and Mccluskieganj. Pakra There is also a railway station of the same Gumla.

== Education ==
In 1986, Rakesh Popli and his wife, Rama (an expert in childhood education), founded the first Ekal Vidyalaya (one-teacher) schools to bring education to the tribes of the region. From 2018, Deptt. of Higher and Technical Education, Govt. of Jharkhand is going to start Polytechnic College "Gumla Polytechnic".The Polytechnic college will be run and manage under "PPP" Mode by Gumla Educational Foundation.

Three colleges under Ranchi University:

- Kartik Oraon College
- Karunavati Devi Memorial College
- Women's College

Technical Institute

- Gumla Polytechnic
- IIST Computer Institute
- Media INFOTECH
- Wings IT

Schools in Gumla:

- Adarsh Vidya Mandir School, Pugu
- Chanchal Cygnus School, Dumerdih
- D.A.V. Public School, Neemtoli
- Don Bosco School, Bhamni
- Kendriya Vidyalaya Gumla
- Notre Dame School
- Oxford Public School
- S.S. High School
- Saraswati Shishu-Vidya Mandir
- Solitaire Educational Academy
- St. Patrick School
- St. Stephen's School
- Ursuline Convent School
- Wescott Public School
- Jawahar Navodaya Vidyalaya, Masaria Dam

St. Ignatius School, founded in 1935 and administered by the Jesuits, has produced international-level hockey players.

== Tourist attractions ==
- Palkot Fort- Palkot Fort is a historic place which was one of the capital of the Nagvanshi dynasty. It is located in Palkot block of the district.
- Anjan - Small village about 18 km away from Gumla. The name of the village has been derived from the name of goddess Anjani, mother of Hanuman. Many objects of archeological importance obtained from this place has been placed at Patna Museum. It is believed to be the birthplace of Lord Hanuman.
- Hapamuni - The ancient village Mahamaya temple that is the identity of this village. Hapamuni Mahamaya temple traces its origin to 11th century. It also has some ancient rock sculpture in front of temple dating to that period. Moreover, with the arrival of Hapamuni agro tech, the village economy has reached new dimensions.
- Nagfeni - It is known for the Jagannath temple and there is a big rock in the shape of snake 'Nag'.
- Navratangarh- It was the seat of old Nagvanshi kings located in Sisai block of the district.
- Tanginath - Tanginath Dham is located in Gumla's Dumri block. Several devotees during the month of Shravan come to shrine which goes back to 7th or 9th Century AD.

basdevkona This one ancient shiva temple from Gumla Located at a distance of 22 km. And it lies in Raidih Block.

== Festivals and dances ==
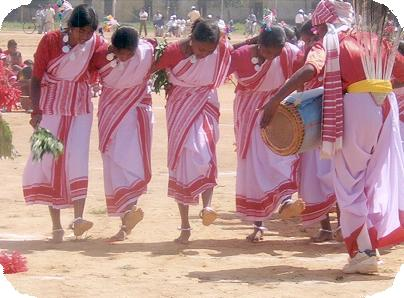
Sarhul dance

The Karma festival rotates from village to village. It is divided into three parts: Raj karma, Budhui karma and Padda karma. Raj karma is celebrated by the entire community; Budhi karma is celebrated by old women in June to summon the rain god. Padda karma is celebrated by the entire village.

Sarhul, an Oraon festival, is known for its dance. Dancers form a circle, with musicians playing traditional instruments inside it. Men wear a white dhoti with a red border and women wear a white sari with a red border. In the bheja dance, dozens of young boys and girls form a chain by clasping hands. The dance has a variety of postures, with melodious traditional music and rhythmic songs.

== See also ==
- Gumla District
